= Municipal councils of Sri Lanka =

Administrative division in Sri Lanka

There are 27 Municipal councils in Sri Lanka, which are the legislative bodies that preside over the largest cities and first tier municipalities in the country. Introduced in 1987 through the 13th Amendment to the Constitution of Sri Lanka, municipal councils became a devolved subject under the Provincial Councils in the Local Government system of Sri Lanka. Until 2025 municipal councils collectively governed 4.19 million people within a 698 square kilometre area. There were 445 Councillors in total, ranging from 53 to 9 per council.

Polonnaruwa Municipal Council was created on 30 June 2017, bifurcated from Thamankaduwa Pradeshiya Sabha.

A extraordinary gazette was published in 2022 to upgrade existing urban councils to municipal councils for the localities of Puttalam, Trincomalee, Vavuniya, Kegalle and Kalutara. Following the conclusion of the Local Government elections in 2025, the municipal councils for the new localities commenced operations.

== Municipal councils ==
Parties

United National Party Sri Lanka Podujana Peramuna Illankai Tamil Arasu Kachchi National Congress Sri Lanka Freedom Party National People's Power (NPP) Independent Samagi Jana Balawegaya

Province	District		Municipal council		Municipality	Established/ Elevated	No. of Councillors	Mayor	Area (km^{2}) (Note: 2012)	Population (2024)	Website
Western	1	Colombo	1	Colombo	Colombo	1865	117 (▲2)	(List)	37	394,533	cmc.lk
Western	1	Colombo	2	Dehiwala-Mount Lavinia	Dehiwala-Mount Lavinia	1959	54 (▲6)	(List)	21	138,460	dmmc.lk
Western	1	Colombo	3	Sri Jayawardenepura Kotte	Sri Jayawardenepura Kotte	1997	39 (▲1)	(List)	17	77,162	kotte.mc.gov.lk
Western	1	Colombo	4	Kaduwela	Kaduwela	2011	47 (▼1)	(List)	87	204,547	kaduwela.mc.gov.lk
Western	1	Colombo	5	Moratuwa	Moratuwa	1997	52 (▲4)	(List)	23	122,567	moratuwa.mc.gov.lk
Western	2	Gampaha	6	Negombo	Negombo	1950	49 (▲1)	(List)	31	117,756	negombo.mc.gov.lk
Western	2	Gampaha	7	Gampaha	Gampaha		28 (▼2)	(List)	38	53,775	gampaha.mc.gov.lk
North Western	3	Kurunegala	8	Kurunegala	Kurunegala	1952	22 (▲1)	(List)	11	21,621	kurunegala.mc.gov.lk
Central	4	Kandy	9	Kandy	Kandy	1865	46 (▲5)	(List)	27	85,000	www.kandymc.org
Central	5	Matale	10	Matale	Matale	1947	22 (▲1)	(List)	26	31,888	
Central	5	Matale	11	Dambulla	Dambulla	2011	22 (▼1)	(List)	58	20,267	
Central	6	Nuwara Eliya	12	Nuwara Eliya	Nuwara Eliya	1949	25 (▲2)	(List)	12	19,274	nuwaraeliya.mc.gov.lk
Uva	7	Badulla	13	Badulla	Badulla		27 (▲2)	(List)	10	34,842	
Uva	7	Badulla	14	Bandarawela	Bandarawela	2011	16 (▼1)	(List)	27	20,481	
Southern	8	Galle	15	Galle	Galle		36 (▲1)	(List)	17	75,429	galle.mc.gov.lk
Southern	9	Matara	16	Matara	Matara		30	(List)	13	60,976	
Southern	10	Hambantota	17	Hambantota	Hambantota	2011	21	(List)	83	18,759	
Sabaragamuwa	11	Ratnapura	18	Ratnapura	Ratnapura		27 (▲2)	(List)	20	39,381	
North Central	12	Anuradhapura	19	Anuradhapura	Anuradhapura		26 (▼3)	(List)	36	38,188	
North Central	13	Polonnaruwa	20	Polonnaruwa	Polonnaruwa	2017	16 (▲5)	(List)	30.29	27,791	https://mcpolonnaruwa.lk/
Northern	14	Jaffna	21	Jaffna	Jaffna	1949	45	(List)	20	63,045	jaffnamc.lk
Eastern	15	Batticaloa	22	Batticaloa	Batticaloa	1967	34 (▼4)	(List)	75	70,124	www.batticaloa.mc.gov.lk
Eastern	16	Ampara	23	Kalmunai	Kalmunai	2001	41	(List)	23	99,893	
Eastern	16	Ampara	24	Akkaraipattu	Akkaraipattu	2011	22 (▲2)	(List)	7	27,760	

Locations of Municipal councils
Municipal councils by party
1. National People's Power (87.0%)
2. Ilankai Tamil Arasu Kachchi (8.69%)
3. National Congress (4.34%)

== See also ==
- List of cities in Sri Lanka
- Provincial government in Sri Lanka
- Local government in Sri Lanka
  - Urban councils of Sri Lanka
  - Pradeshiya Sabha
