= 2025 Sri Lankan local elections =

- 6 May 2025

8,793 local council seats; 339 of 341 local councils in Sri Lanka; 28 municipal councils, 36 urban councils and 275 pradeshiya sabhas
- Registered: 17,156,338
- Turnout: 61.88% (▼18.06 pp)
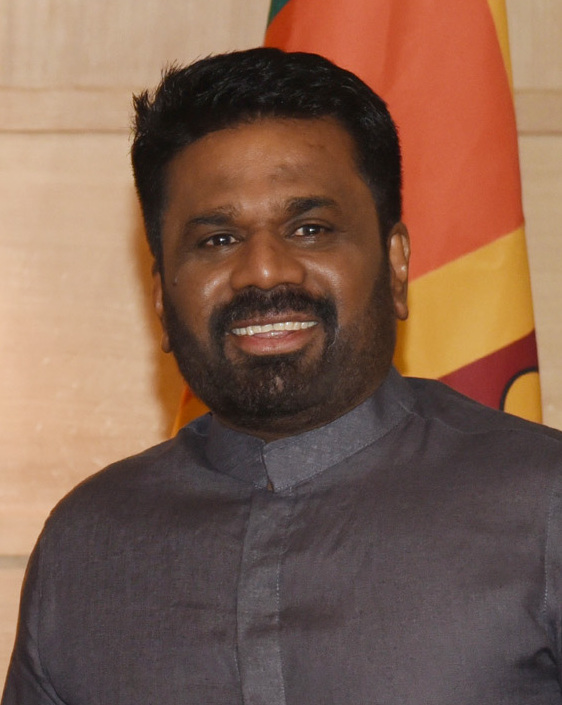

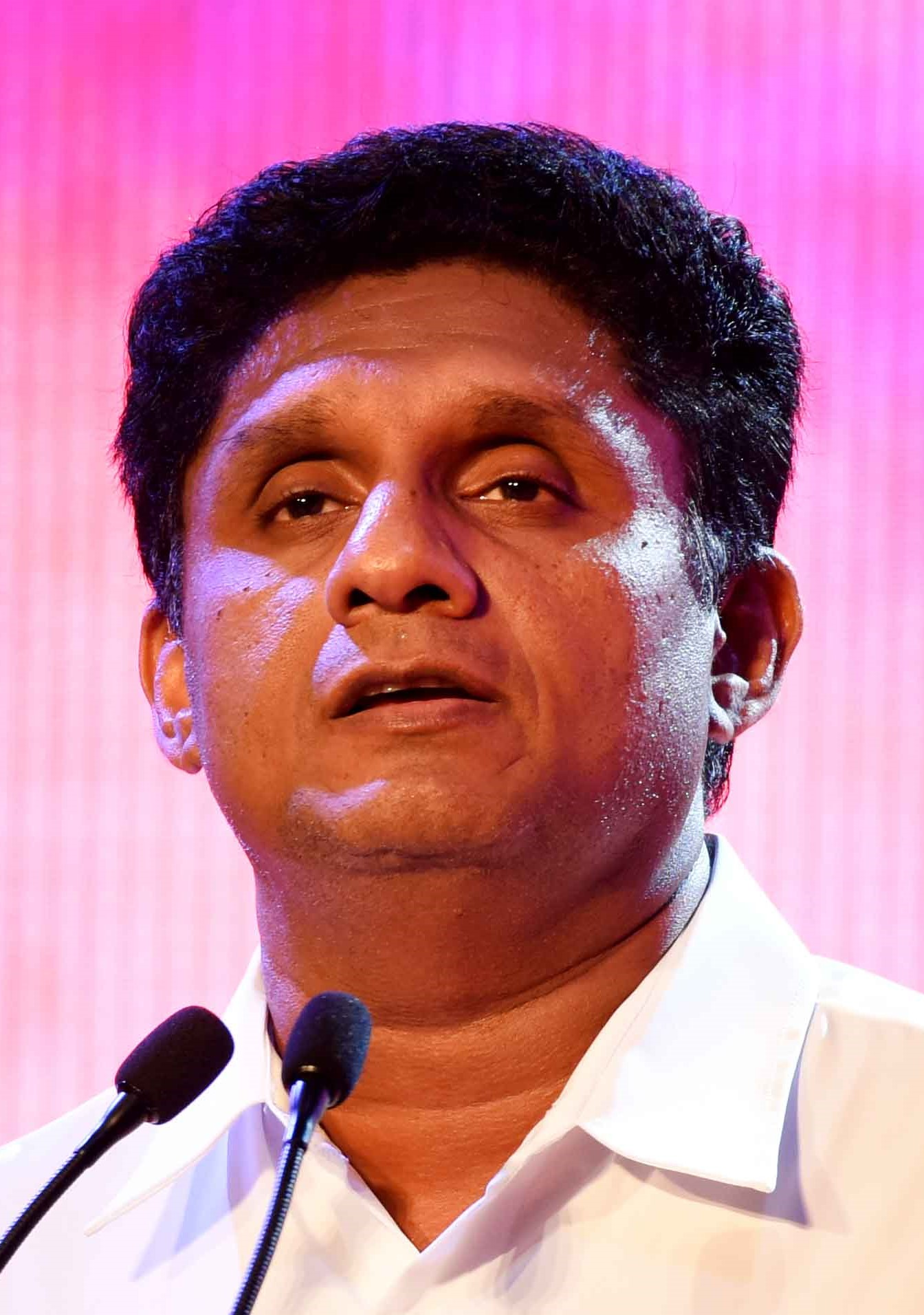

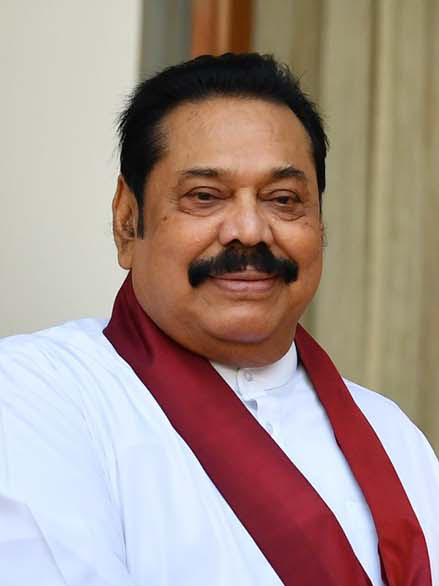

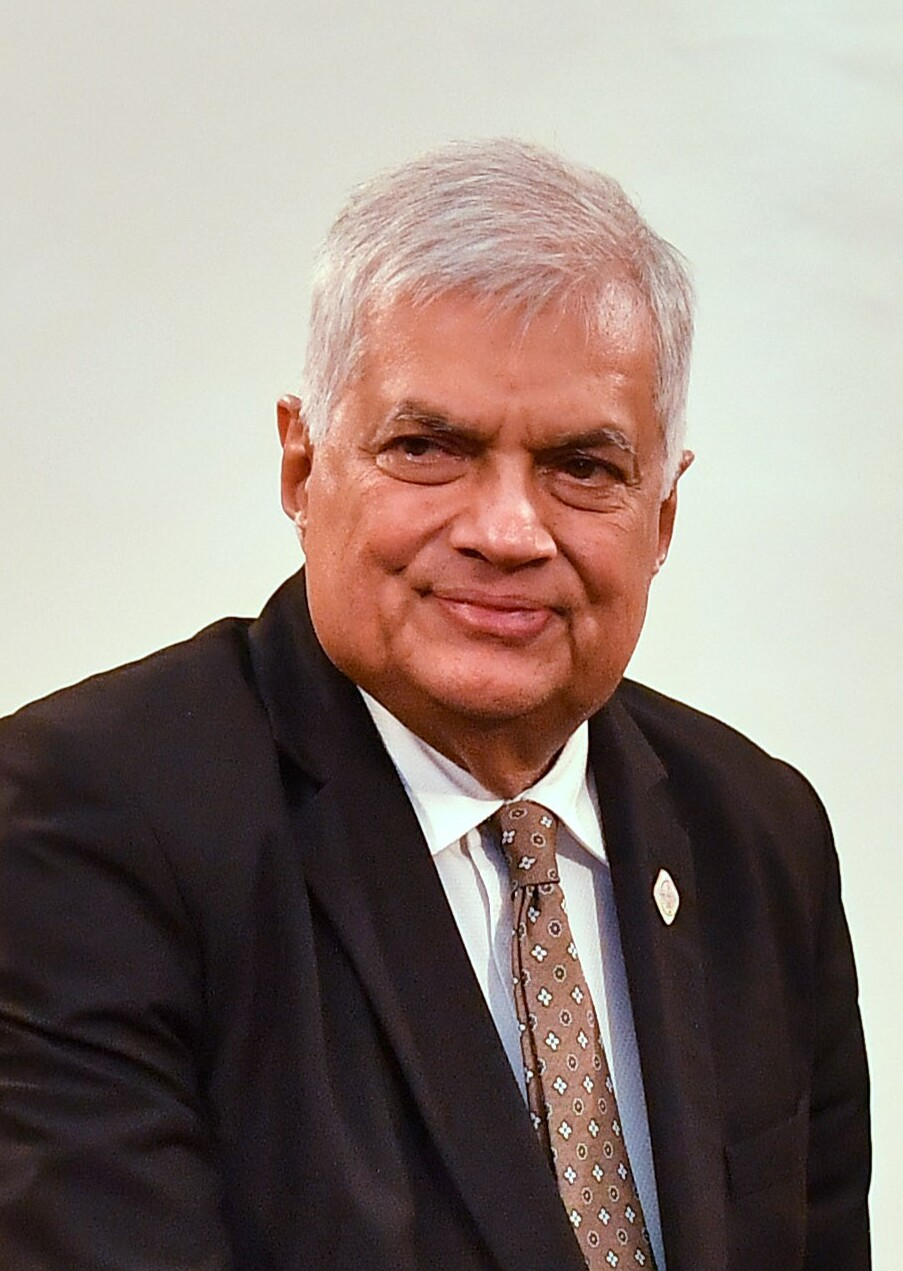

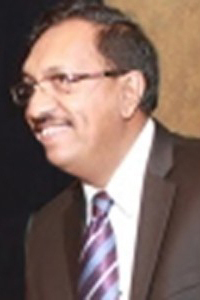
	First party	Second party	Third party
Leader	Anura Kumara Dissanayake	Sajith Premadasa	Mahinda Rajapaksa
Party	NPP	SJB	SLPP
Last election	5.75%, 0 councils (Note: Indicates the results achieved by the Janatha Vimukthi Peramuna in the 2018 election.)	DNC (Note: The party was formed in 2020 and therefore did not contest the 2018 election.)	40.47%, 231 councils
Seats before	434	DNC	3,436
Seats won	3,927	1,767	742
Seat change	▲3,493	▲1,767	▼2,694
Popular vote	4,503,930	2,258,480	954,517
Percentage	43.26%	21.69%	9.17%
Swing	▲37.51 pp	▲21.69 pp	▼31.30 pp
	Fourth party	Fifth party	Sixth party
		ITAK
Leader	Ranil Wickremesinghe	S. Shritharan	Anura Priyadarshana Yapa
Party	UNP	ITAK	PA
Last election	29.42%, 34 councils (Note: Indicates the results achieved by the United National Front in the 2018 election.)	2.73%, 41 councils (Note: Indicate the results achieved by the Tamil National Alliance in the 2018 election.)	12.10%, 9 councils (Note: Indicates the results achieved by the United People's Freedom Alliance in the 2018 election.)
Seats before	2,433	417	1,048
Seats won	381	377	300
Seat change	▼2,052	▼40	▼748
Popular vote	488,406	307,657	387,098
Percentage	4.69%	2.96%	3.72%
Swing	▼24.73 pp	▲0.23 pp	▼8.38 pp

Local elections were held in Sri Lanka on 6 May 2025 According to the Election Commission of Sri Lanka, of the 17,296,330 registered voters nationwide, 17,156,338 were eligible to vote in this election. Voters elected 8,793 members for a four-year term to 339 of the 341 local authorities in the country, comprising 28 municipal councils, 36 urban councils, and 275 pradeshiya sabhas.

The ruling National People's Power (NPP) emerged as the largest party, winning 3,927 council seats and securing 43.26% of the vote, a notable decline from their result in the parliamentary elections the previous year. Voter turnout was relatively low, recorded at 61.88%, compared to 79.46% in the recent presidential election and 68.93% in the parliamentary election.

== Background ==
Sri Lanka's last local government elections in 2018 resulted in the Sri Lanka Podujana Peramuna (SLPP) securing a majority with 40% of the vote.

Gotabaya Rajapaksa, contesting under the SLPP, subsequently won the 2019 Sri Lankan presidential election, while Mahinda Rajapaksa led the SLPP to victory in the 2020 Sri Lankan parliamentary election.

During their tenure, the SLPP government, faced numerous challenges, including the COVID-19 pandemic and a severe economic crisis. These issues culminated in widespread protests and the 2022 Sri Lankan political crisis.

As a result, Gotabaya Rajapaksa fled the country and resigned as president, while Mahinda Rajapaksa also stepped down as prime minister. Ranil Wickremesinghe was first appointed prime minister and later became acting president following Gotabaya Rajapaksa's resignation. On 20 July 2022, Wickremesinghe was elected by parliament as the 9th President of Sri Lanka, tasked with completing the remainder of Rajapaksa's term.

In the 2024 Sri Lankan presidential election held on 21 September 2024, Anura Kumara Dissanayake of the National People's Power (NPP) defeated Opposition Leader Sajith Premadasa and incumbent President Ranil Wickremesinghe to become the 10th President of Sri Lanka. In the subsequent 2024 Sri Lankan parliamentary election, the NPP emerged as the largest party, winning a supermajority with 159 elected members and 61.56% of the votes. The NPP subsequently formed the government of Sri Lanka.

=== Postponing of polls ===
The term of office for 340 out of 341 local government authorities expired at midnight on 19 March 2023. Elections, originally scheduled for 2022, were indefinitely postponed by President Rajapaksa due to the economic crisis, extending the term by one year.

The Election Commission set 9 March 2023 as the new election date, with the SLPP being the first to submit deposits.

On 14 February 2023, postal voting was delayed when the government printer refused to supply ballots without payment, raising concerns about further postponements. By late February, doubts over the election's feasibility grew amid funding disputes. President Wickremesinghe argued elections should not be held during the crisis due to financial constraints. On 24 February, the Election Commission officially postponed the elections again, initially rescheduling them for 25 April.

Opposition parties, including the Samagi Jana Balawegaya, criticised Wickremesinghe's position. Sajith Premadasa noted that the UNP had submitted nominations despite no confirmed election date.

=== Court ruling and subsequent proceedings ===
On 22 August 2024, the Supreme Court ruled that the election delay violated voters' rights and ordered the Election Commission to hold elections immediately.

On 3 December 2024, the cabinet approved drafting the Local Authorities Elections (Special Provisions) Bill to annul the 2023 nominations for the postponed elections and call for new nominations. The bill was published in The Sri Lanka Gazette on 1 January and presented to Parliament on 9 January 2025.

Nizam Kariapper and three other parties petitioned the Supreme Court, challenging the constitutionality of certain clauses. Following hearings, the Court ruled that some clauses were inconsistent with the Constitution and required a special majority for enactment. Despite this, on 17 February 2025, Parliament passed the bill by special majority without amendments. It was endorsed by the Speaker the same day, becoming the Local Authorities Elections (Special Provisions) Act No. 01 of 2025.

A Gazette Extraordinary issued on 17 February 2025 stated that the term of 339 out of 341 local government authorities would commence on 2 June 2025. This includes 28 municipal councils, 36 urban councils and 275 pradeshiya sabhas. The Kalmunai Municipal Council was excluded due to ongoing legal proceedings, while the Elpitiya Pradeshiya Sabha was excluded as its election had been held on 26 October 2024.

On 3 March 2025, the Election Commission announced nominations for 336 local authorities would be accepted from 17 to 20 March 2025. The Kalmunai Municipal Council and the pradeshiya sabhas of Dehiattakandiya, Elpitiya, Mannar and Poonakari were excluded. On 10 March, the Commission announced nominations for Dehiattakandiya, Mannar and Poonakari would be accepted from 24 to 27 March.

On 20 March 2025, the Election Commission set the election date for 6 May 2025. The elections for the three pradeshiya sabhas—Dehiattakandiya, Mannar and Poonakari—which finalised nominations on 27 March 2025, will also be also held on the same date.

== Timeline ==
Key events and dates
Date	Day	Event	Ref.
21 September 2024	Saturday	2024 Sri Lankan presidential election: Anura Kumara Dissanayake is elected as president.	
14 November 2024	Thursday	2024 Sri Lankan parliamentary election: The National People's Power emerged as the largest party, securing a supermajority with 159 elected members and 61.56% of the vote.	
17–20 March 2025	Monday to Thursday	The nomination period for 336 local authorities (28 municipal councils, 36 urban councils and 272 pradeshiya sabhas).	
24–27 March 2025	Monday to Thursday	The nomination period for Dehiattakandiya, Mannar and Poonakari Pradeshiya Sabhas.	
24, 25, 28 and 29 April 2025	Thursday, Friday, Monday and Tuesday	Revised postal voting dates for pre-approved applicants. Originally scheduled for 22 to 24 April, with 28 and 29 allocated as supplementary dates.	
6 May 2025	Tuesday	Election day. Polling commenced at 07:00 and concluded at 16:00.	
2 June 2025	Monday	The commencement date of the new term for 339 local government authorities (28 municipal councils, 36 urban councils and 275 pradeshiya sabhas).	
2 June 2025	Monday	The formation and activities of 161 out of 339 local councils commenced. This applies only to councils in which a political party or an independent group has secured a clear majority.	

== Electoral system ==
As of the 2025 elections, there are 341 local councils, comprising 29 municipal councils, 36 urban councils and 276 pradeshiya sabhas. Local authority elections are conducted using a mixed-member proportional representation (MMPR) system, as outlined in the Local Authorities Election (Amendment) Acts No. 22 of 2012, No. 1 of 2016 and No. 16 of 2017.

Under this system, 60% of seats are allocated through the first-past-the-post (FPTP) method, where the candidate with the most votes wins in a designated single or multi-member ward. The remaining 40% are distributed proportionally (PR) based on the votes received by each political party or independent group. The first election conducted under this system was the 2018 Sri Lankan local elections.

The Delimitation Commission has defined the number of wards for all local authorities, with the details published in Gazette Extraordinary No. 1928/26 of 21 August 2015 and No. 2006/44 of 17 February 2017.

To allocate seats proportionally, the district returning officer first calculates the average votes per seat (X) by dividing the total valid votes by the total available seats. Each party's or independent group's seat entitlement (Y) is then determined by dividing its total valid votes by X. Finally, the number of seats won through first-past-the-post (FPTP) is subtracted from Y, determining the additional seats (Z) awarded under proportional representation.

Under the mixed-member proportional representation (MMPR) system, a party's seats are allocated based on its share of the total vote. If entitled to ten seats but winning seven constituencies, it receives three list seats to meet its entitlement. However, if a party wins more constituencies than its entitlement, the extra seat is an overhang seat. Overhang seats arise from the winner-takes-all nature of electoral districts or the geographic distribution of party support, allowing a party to win many seats with relatively few votes.

=== Election of local council leadership ===
The law governing elections to local councils stipulates that a political party or an independent group holding 50% or more of the total membership in a local authority is entitled to nominate two of its members as mayor and deputy mayor in municipal and urban councils, or as chairman and vice chairman in pradeshiya sabhas. In instances where no single party has achieved a majority, the leadership of the council must be elected by secret or public ballot on the first sitting day of the newly constituted local authority.

== Recent Sri Lankan election results ==
Election	Results													
Election	National People's Power		Samagi Jana Balawegaya		New Democratic Front (Note: Ranil Wickremesinghe contested as an independent candidate in the 2024 presidential election. The NDF contested the 2024 parliamentary election as an alliance under the leadership of Wickremesinghe.)		Sri Lanka Podujana Peramuna		Ilankai Tamil Arasu Kachchi		Others		Turnout	Map
Election	Votes	%	Votes	%	Votes	%	Votes	%	Votes	%	Votes	%	Turnout	Map
2024 presidential election (Note: Without preferences)	5,634,915	42.31%	4,363,035	32.76%	2,299,767	17.27%	342,781	2.57%	—N/a	—N/a	407,473	3.06%	79.46%	
2024 Elpitiya PS election	17,295	47.64%	7,924	21.83%	—N/a	—N/a	3,597	9.91%	—N/a	—N/a	7,489	20.62%	66.18%	—N/a
2024 parliamentary election	6,863,186	61.56%	1,968,716	17.66%	500,835	4.49%	350,429	3.14%	257,813	2.31%	1,207,027	10.22%	68.93%	

== Contesting parties ==
A list of recognised political parties was published in a Gazette Extraordinary on 3 March 2025 by the Election Commission.

Contesting parties
Party name	Symbol	2018 Sri Lankan local elections		
Party name	Symbol	Votes %	Seats won	Local authorities won
Sri Lanka Podujana Peramuna		40.74%	3,436 / 8,708	231 / 340
United National Party		29.42%	2,433 / 8,708	34 / 340
People's Alliance		12.10%	1,048 / 8,708	9 / 340
National People's Power		5.75%	434 / 8,708	0 / 340
Ilankai Tamil Arasu Kachchi		2.73%	417 / 8,708	41 / 340
Samagi Jana Balawegaya		—N/a	—N/a	—N/a

== Campaign ==
=== Campaign finances ===
On 27 March 2025, the Election Commission announced expenditure limits for each local authority under the Election Expenditure Act, No. 3 of 2023. The minimum expenditure per voter is set at SL Rs. 74, while the maximum is capped at Rs. 160. 50% of the funds will be allocated for candidates contesting at the electoral level. 30% for those at the local government institution level and 20% for candidates on the second list.

== Opinion polls ==
Date	Polling firm	NPP	SJB	UNP	SLPP	Others	Lead	Margin of error	Sample size
4 May 2025	Numbers.lk	65%	11%	7%	5%	12%	54	±5	1,256

== Voting ==
Of the 17,296,330 registered voters nationwide, 17,156,338 were eligible to vote in this election, as elections for the Kalmunai Municipal Council and the Elpitiya Pradeshiya Sabha will not be held. Voting took place at 13,759 polling centres across the country, with 75,589 candidates representing 49 recognised political parties and 257 independent groups.

=== Postal voting ===
Postal voting was originally scheduled to take place from 22 to 24 April 2025, with 28 and 29 April allocated for voters who were unable to cast their votes on the earlier dates. However, on 17 April, the Election Commission rescheduled the postal voting to 24, 25, 28 and 29 April. It is limited to pre-approved applicants, primarily government employees whose election duties prevent them from voting on election day.

Postal voting commenced on 24 April and concluded on 29 April as scheduled.

=== Election day ===
Voting commenced at 07:00 on 6 May 2025 and concluded at 16:00.

== Controversies and violence ==
=== Rejection of nomination papers and legal proceedings ===
On 21 March 2025, the Election Commission reported the rejection of over 400 nomination lists for failing to meet the criteria set out in election laws. Reasons include failure to achieve the mandated percentages for female and youth representation, as well as missing supporting documents for candidates.

On 4 April 2025, the Court of Appeal ordered the acceptance of 37 previously rejected nomination lists, while the Supreme Court dismissed more than 50 petitions concerning the same issue. On 10 April 2025, the Court of Appeal ordered the acceptance of a further 35 previously rejected nomination papers.

On 7 April 2025, the Court of Appeal issued a stay order halting any further action related to the conduct of elections for several local government authorities, including the Colombo Municipal Council (CMC) and the pradeshiya sabhas of Harispaththuwa, Kuliyapitiya, Panwila, Pathadumbara and Udapalatha. The stay order was scheduled to remain in effect until 16 May, the date on which the Court had scheduled the hearing of the petitions. However, on 11 April 2025, the Court of Appeal lifted the injunction and permitted the conduct of elections for 18 local authorities, including the CMC. The Court also issued an order to accept the previously rejected nomination papers for these local authorities.

=== Assassination ===
On 22 April 2025, Dan Priyasad, a Sri Lanka Podujana Peramuna (SLPP) candidate for the Kolonnawa Urban Council, was shot and killed by two individuals.

== Results ==
=== National ===
Party	Votes	%	Seats	
Party	Votes	%	Total	+/-
National People's Power	4,503,930	43.26	3927	+3493
Samagi Jana Balawegaya	2,258,480	21.69	1767	New
Sri Lanka Podujana Peramuna	954,517	9.17	742	-2694
United National Party	488,406	4.69	381	-2052
People's Alliance	387,098	3.72	300	-748
Ilankai Tamil Arasu Kachchi	307,657	2.96	377	New
Sarvajana Balaya	294,681	2.83	226	New
Sri Lanka Muslim Congress	139,858	1.34	116	+43
Democratic Tamil National Alliance	89,177	0.86	106	New
Others	987,006	9.48	851	–
Total	10,410,810	100.00	8793	0
Valid votes	10,410,810	98.07		
Invalid/blank votes	205,277	1.93		
Total votes	10,616,087	100.00		
Registered voters/turnout	17,156,338	61.88		
Source: Election Commission of Sri Lanka, Ada Derana, Newswire

=== District ===
Districts won by NPP
Districts won by ITAK

District results for the 2025 Sri Lankan local elections
Prov.	Dist.	NPP			SJB			ITAK			Others			Total			Turnout
Prov.	Dist.	Votes	%	Seats	Votes	%	Seats	Votes	%	Seats	Votes	%	Seats	Polled	Registered Electors	Seats	Turnout
WES	COL	476,182	47.80%	297	195,380	19.61%	161	–	–	–	324,664	32.59%	175	1,016,611	1,773,460	581	57.32%
WES	GAM	599,906	54.48%	402	225,043	20.44%	141	–	–	–	276,245	25.08%	174	1,122,106	1,896,304	717	59.17%
WES	KAL	269,377	41.56%	207	151,800	23.42%	109	–	–	–	226,931	35.02%	160	660,663	1,033,206	476	63.94%
CEN	KAN	323,957	44.58%	307	189,246	26.04%	166	–	–	–	213,411	29.38%	181	746,833	1,202,558	654	62.10%
CEN	MAL	117,565	43.61%	139	64,917	24.08%	68	–	–	–	87,100	32.31%	87	276,015	434,246	294	63.56%
CEN	NUW	133,391	35.59%	131	101,085	26.97%	82	–	–	–	140,277	37.44%	113	386,232	610,117	326	63.30%
SOU	GAL	233,129	45.85%	222	122,353	23.01%	97	–	–	–	176,170	31.14%	138	541,435	856,355	457	63.23%
SOU	MTR	203,400	48.87%	207	93,543	22.48%	82	–	–	–	119,262	28.74%	105	424,993	693,549	394	61.28%
SOU	HAM	161,655	48.55%	146	67,207	20.18%	55	–	–	–	104,131	31.27%	83	338,234	526,599	284	64.23%
NOR	JAF	56,615	20.45%	81	4,103	1.48%	4	88,443	31.95%	135	127,636	46.12%	189	281,744	498,140	409	56.56%
NOR	KIL	10,552	17.65%	12	2,683	4.49%	2	29,173	48.80%	36	17,377	29.06%	20	61,185	102,387	70	59.76%
NOR	MAN	14,133	21.09%	19	13,928	20.78%	18	11,056	16.50%	18	27,897	41.63%	37	67,732	91,373	92	74.13%
NOR	VAV	17,984	22.24%	26	10,596	13.10%	15	13,385	16.55%	16	38,900	48.11%	49	82,512	129,293	106	63.81%
NOR	MUL	9,534	17.96%	12	4,583	8.63%	7	20,080	37.83%	26	18,888	35.58%	24	54,098	87,800	69	61.62%
EAS	BAT	53,002	18.62%	44	20,505	7.20%	20	91,818	32.25%	85	119,351	41.93%	104	287,739	455,520	253	63.17%
EAS	AMP	92,579	29.24%	114	41,851	13.22%	51	22,308	7.05%	25	159,892	50.49%	161	320,160	478,669	351	66.89%
EAS	TRI	52,569	24.34%	68	34,328	15.89%	36	31,394	14.53%	36	97,719	45.24%	90	218,853	319,399	230	68.52%
NW	KUR	414,944	47.83%	331	225,395	25.98%	163	–	–	–	227,123	26.19%	163	880,151	1,430,286	657	61.54%
NW	PUT	159,242	42.31%	144	88,991	23.65%	72	–	–	–	128,107	34.04%	106	381,746	668,525	322	57.10%
NC	ANU	245,307	50.12%	212	111,910	22.86%	86	–	–	–	132,239	27.02%	98	497,365	750,101	396	66.31%
NC	POL	115,296	53.84%	97	51,040	23.83%	40	–	–	–	47,819	22.33%	38	217,863	354,111	175	61.52%
UVA	BAD	188,269	42.36%	203	107,891	24.27%	93	–	–	–	148,327	33.37%	133	458,890	712,401	429	64.41%
UVA	MON	120,058	45.56%	108	71,897	27.28%	53	–	–	–	71,551	27.16%	53	268,915	403,519	214	66.64%
SAB	RAT	235,841	42.12%	210	144,990	25.89%	109	–	–	–	179,102	31.99%	134	571,277	932,855	453	61.24%
SAB	KEG	199,443	44.99%	188	113,215	25.54%	89	–	–	–	130,624	29.47%	107	452,735	715,565	384	63.27%
Total		4,503,930	43.26%	3,927	2,258,480	21.69%	1,767	307,657	2.96%	377	3,340,743	32.09%	2,722	10,616,087	17,156,338	8,793	61.88%

== Political control of local councils ==
On 2 June 2025, the formation and activities of 161 out of 339 local councils commenced, as stipulated in Gazette Extraordinary No. 2402/02 dated 17 February 2025. This applies only to councils in which a political party or an independent group has secured a clear majority. In instances where no single party has achieved a majority, the leadership of the council must be elected by secret or public ballot on the first sitting day of the newly constituted local authority.

=== Municipal councils ===
Municipal councils of Sri Lanka

Municipal councils of Sri Lanka
Province	District	Municipal council	Municipal area	No. of seats	Party with most votes	Seat distribution
Western	Colombo	Colombo	Colombo	117	National People's Power	NPP 48; SJB 29; UNP 13; SLPP 5; SLMC 4; Ind-3 3; Ind-5 2; UPA 2; SB 2; Ind-4 2; PA 1; NFF 1; URF 1; Ind-1 1; Ind-2 1; DNA 1; NPPT 1
Western	Colombo	Dehiwala-Mount Lavinia	Dehiwala-Mount Lavinia	54	National People's Power	NPP 29; SJB 10; UNP 5; SLPP 4; SB 3; PA 2; Ind 1
Western	Colombo	Kaduwela	Kaduwela	47	National People's Power	NPP 26; Ind 8; SJB 5; UNP 3; SLPP 2; SB 1; NFF 1; PA 1
Western	Colombo	Moratuwa	Moratuwa	52	National People's Power	NPP 26; SJB 11; SLPP 6; UNP 3; SB 2; PA 2; Ind 1; NFF 1
Western	Colombo	Sri Jayawardenepura Kotte	Sri Jayawardenepura Kotte	39	National People's Power	NPP 21; SJB 7; PA 3; SB 2; SLPP 2; UNP 2; URF 1; UNA 1
Western	Gampaha	Gampaha	Gampaha	28	National People's Power	NPP 17; SJB 4; SLPP 4; PA 2; UNP 1
Western	Gampaha	Negombo	Negombo	49	National People's Power	NPP 27; SJB 9; Ind-10 2; Ind-4 2; SLPP 1; Ind-5 1; SLMC 1; Ind-8 1; Ind-9 1; Ind-7 1; PA 1; Ind-2 1; Ind-1 1
Western	Kalutara	Kalutara	Kalutara	31	National People's Power	NPP 12; SJB 8; SLMC 3; UNP 3; SLPP 1; PA 1; NFF 1; Ind 1; SB 1
Central	Kandy	Kandy	Kandy	46	National People's Power	NPP 24; SJB 11; UNP 6; SB 2; SLPP 1; UNA 1; Ind 1
Central	Matale	Dambulla	Dambulla	22	National People's Power	NPP 13; Ind 4; SLPP 3; SJB 2
Central	Matale	Matale	Matale	22	National People's Power	NPP 10; SJB 6; CWC 2; SB 1; SLPP 1; UNA 1; UNP 1
Central	Nuwara Eliya	Nuwara Eliya	Nuwara Eliya	25	National People's Power	NPP 12; SJB 4; UNP 3; Ind 3; CWC 2; SLPP 1
Southern	Galle	Galle	Galle	36	National People's Power	NPP 17; SJB 9; UNP 5; SLPP 3; PA 2
Southern	Matara	Matara	Matara	30	National People's Power	NPP 17; SJB 4; Ind 3; SLPP 2; SLCP 2; UNP 1; PA 1
Southern	Hambantota	Hambantota	Hambantota	21	National People's Power	NPP 8; SJB 7; PA 3; SLPP 2; SB 1
Northern	Jaffna	Jaffna	Jaffna	45	Ilankai Tamil Arasu Kachchi	ITAK 13; ACTC 12; NPP 10; EPDP 4; DTNA 4; UNP 1; SJB 1
Northern	Vavuniya	Vavuniya	Vavuniya	21	Democratic Tamil National Alliance	DTNA 4; NPP 4; SLLP 4; ITAK 3; SJB 2; ACTC 1; DNA 1; Ind-1 1; Ind-2 1
Eastern	Batticaloa	Batticaloa	Batticaloa	34	Ilankai Tamil Arasu Kachchi	ITAK 16; NPP 9; Ind 4; TMVP 3; SJB 2
Eastern	Ampara	Akkaraipattu	Akkaraipattu	22	National Congress	NC 11; NPP 4; SLMC 3; ACMC 2; SJB 1; Ind 1
Eastern	Ampara	Kalmunai	Kalmunai	No election due to ongoing legal proceedings		
Eastern	Trincomalee	Trincomalee	Trincomalee	25	Ilankai Tamil Arasu Kachchi	ITAK 9; NPP 6; DTNA 4; SLMC 3; Ind-2 1; Ind-3 1; UNP 1
North Western	Kurunegala	Kurunegala	Kurunegala	22	National People's Power	NPP 10; SJB 5; SLMP 2; SLPP 1; UNA 1; UNP 1; ACMC 1; PA 1
North Western	Puttalam	Puttalam	Puttalam	19	National People's Power	NPP 7; SJB 4; SLMC 3; NFGG 3; UNP 1; Ind 1
North Central	Anuradhapura	Anuradhapura	Anuradhapura	26	National People's Power	NPP 15; SJB 5; UNP 2; SLPP 1; PA 1; SB 1; Ind 1
North Central	Polonnaruwa	Polonnaruwa	Polonnaruwa	10	National People's Power	NPP 6; SJB 2; PA 1; UNP 1
Uva	Badulla	Badulla	Badulla	27	National People's Power	NPP 15; SJB 6; PA 3; SLPP 2; UNP 1
Uva	Badulla	Bandarawela	Bandarawela	16	National People's Power	NPP 6; Ind-1 5; SJB 3; Ind-2 1; SLPP 1
Sabaragamuwa	Ratnapura	Ratnapura	Ratnapura	27	National People's Power	NPP 12; SJB 5; SLPP 5; UNP 2; Ind 1; SB 1; PA 1
Sabaragamuwa	Kegalle	Kegalle	Kegalle	21	National People's Power	NPP 12; SJB 3; SLPP 3; Ind 1; UNP 1; PSA 1

=== Urban councils ===
Urban councils of Sri Lanka

Urban councils of Sri Lanka
Province	District	Urban council	Urban area	No. of seats	Party with most votes	Seat distribution
Western	Colombo	Boralesgamuwa	Boralesgamuwa	17	National People's Power	NPP 10; SJB 2; PA 1; SLPP 1; SB 1; Ind-1 1; UNP 1
Western	Colombo	Kesbewa	Kesbewa	34	National People's Power	NPP 20; SJB 5; SLPP 3; Ind-2 2; SB 1; UNP 1; PA 1; NFF 1
Western	Colombo	Kolonnawa	Kolonnawa	19	National People's Power	NPP 9; SJB 6; UNP 2; SLPP 1; SB 1
Western	Colombo	Maharagama	Maharagama	43	National People's Power	NPP 24; SJB 6; Ind-1 3; SLPP 3; SB 2; Ind-4 2; UNP 1; Ind-3 1; Ind-2 1
Western	Colombo	Seethawakapura	Avissawella	25	National People's Power	NPP 11; SJB 6; Ind-2 4; SLPP 1; UNP 1; SB 1; Ind-1 1
Western	Gampaha	Ja-Ela	Ja-Ela	17	National People's Power	NPP 9; SJB 4; Ind 1; UNP 1; SLPP 1; PA 1
Western	Gampaha	Katunayake–Seeduwa	Katunayake–Seeduwa	19	National People's Power	NPP 10; SJB 4; SLPP 2; UNP 1; SB 1; PA 1
Western	Gampaha	Minuwangoda	Minuwangoda	17	National People's Power	NPP 9; SJB 4; SB 2; SLPP 1; UNP 1
Western	Gampaha	Peliyagoda	Peliyagoda	17	National People's Power	NPP 8; SJB 4; UNP 2; SLPP 1; SB 1; PA 1
Western	Gampaha	Wattala – Mabola	Wattala–Mabola	16	National People's Power	NPP 6; SJB 6; UNP 4
Western	Kalutara	Beruwala	Beruwala	16	Independent Group	Ind 7; SJB 6; NPP 3
Western	Kalutara	Horana	Horana	13	National People's Power	NPP 6; Ind 2; SJB 2; UNP 2; SLPP 1
Western	Kalutara	Panadura	Panadura	18	National People's Power	SLPP 10; SJB 2; SLPP 2; UNP 1; NLNP 1; NFF 1; SB 1
Central	Kandy	Gampola	Gampola	29	Samagi Jana Balawegaya	SJB 11; NPP 10; UNP 4; PA 2; SLPP 1; SB 1
Central	Kandy	Kadugannawa	Kadugannawa	15	National People's Power	NPP 6; SJB 4; Ind-2 1; SLPP 1; PA 1; UNP 1; Ind-1 1
Central	Kandy	Nawalapitiya	Nawalapitiya	15	National People's Power	NPP 5; Ind-2 5; SJB 2; Ind-1 2; UNA 1
Central	Kandy	Wattegama	Wattegama	16	National People's Power	NPP 8; SJB 4; PA 2; SB 1; SLPP 1
Central	Nuwara Eliya	Hatton–Dickoya	Hatton–Dickoya	15	National People's Power	NPP 6; SJB 5; CWC 2; Ind 1; UNP 1
Central	Nuwara Eliya	Talawakelle–Lindula	Talawakelle–Lindula	12	Up-Country People's Front	UCPF 3; NPP 4; SJB 2; CWC 2; SLPP 1; (Note: UCPF obtained 1,023 votes, winning one ward with a vote share of 32.26%. NPP received 866 votes, winning two wards with a vote share of 27.31%. According to the MMPR calculation, three seats were allocated to UCPF and four to NPP.)
Southern	Galle	Ambalangoda	Ambalangoda	22	National People's Power	NPP 11; SJB 5; SLPP 3; UNP 1; Ind 1; SB 1
Southern	Galle	Hikkaduwa	Hikkaduwa	19	National People's Power	NPP 9; SJB 4; SLPP 2; SB 2; NFF 1; UNP 1
Southern	Matara	Weligama	Weligama	19	National People's Power	NPP 9; SJB 3; Ind-1 3; Ind-2 2; UNP 1; SLPP 1
Southern	Hambantota	Tangalle	Tangalle	19	National People's Power	NPP 9; SJB 5; SLPP 3; UNP 1; SB 1
Northern	Jaffna	Chavakachcheri	Chavakachcheri	18	All Ceylon Tamil Congress	ACTC 6; ITAK 6; NPP 3; DTNA 2; EPDP 1
Northern	Jaffna	Point Pedro	Point Pedro	15	All Ceylon Tamil Congress	ACTC 5; ITAK 4; NPP 2; DTNA 2; Ind 1; EPDP 1
Northern	Jaffna	Valvettithurai	Valvettithurai	16	All Ceylon Tamil Congress	ACTC 7; ITAK 5; NPP 3; EPDP 1
Northern	Mannar	Mannar	Mannar	16	Ilankai Tamil Arasu Kachchi	ITAK 4; NPP 3; SJB 3; DTNA 2; TMK 2; SLLP 1; UNA 1
Eastern	Batticaloa	Eravur	Eravur	17	Sri Lanka Muslim Congress	SLMC 7; UNP 4; TMVP 2; SJB 1; NPP 1; ITAK 1; DTNA 1
Eastern	Batticaloa	Kattankudy	Kattankudy	18	Sri Lanka Muslim Congress	SLMC 10; NPP 3; NFGG 2; Ind 1; SLLP 1; SJB 1
Eastern	Ampara	Ampara	Ampara	17	National People's Power	NPP 10; SJB 3; Ind 2; SLPP 1; PA 1
Eastern	Trincomalee	Trincomalee	Trincomalee	25	Ilankai Tamil Arasu Kachchi	ITAK 9; NPP 6; DTNA 4; SLMC 3; Ind-2 1; Ind-3 1; UNP 1
North Western	Kurunegala	Kuliyapitiya	Kuliyapitiya	16	National People's Power	NPP 6; SJB 5; UNP 3; SLPP 1; PA 1
North Western	Puttalam	Chilaw	Chilaw	20	National People's Power	NPP 9; Ind 6; SJB 4; SLPP 1
Uva	Badulla	Haputale	Haputale	11	Independent Group	Ind 5; NPP 4; SJB 2
Sabaragamuwa	Ratnapura	Balangoda	Balangoda	16	National People's Power	NPP 7; SJB 5; SLPP 2; Ind 1; UNP 1
Sabaragamuwa	Ratnapura	Embilipitiya	Embilipitiya	14	National People's Power	NPP 8; SJB 3; SLPP 1; UNP 1; SB 1

=== Pradeshiya Sabhas ===
Pradeshiya Sabhas of Sri Lanka: Western Province

Pradeshiya Sabhas of Sri Lanka: Western Province
District	Pradeshiya Sabha	No. of seats	Party with most votes	Seat distribution
Colombo	Homagama	48	National People's Power	NPP 28; SJB 7; SLPP 6; UNP 2; SB 2; PA 1; Ind 1; NFF 1
Colombo	Kotikawatta–Mulleriyawa	39	National People's Power	NPP 22; SJB 7; SLPP 3; UNP 2; PA 1; SB 1; UPA 1; SLMC 1; Ind 1
Colombo	Seethawaka	47	National People's Power	NPP 23; SJB 8; SLPP 7; Ind 3; SB 2; UNP 2; NFF 1; PA 1
Gampaha	Attanagalla	53	National People's Power	NPP 30; SJB 8; SLPP 5; PA 3; SB 3; UNA 2; UNP 2
Gampaha	Biyagama	57	National People's Power	NPP 32; SJB 8; SLPP 7; UNP 5; SB 2; SLMC 1; NFF 1; SLLP 1
Gampaha	Divulapitiya	49	National People's Power	NPP 26; SJB 10; SLPP 9; UNP 3; SB 1
Gampaha	Dompe	43	National People's Power	NPP 25; SJB 10; SLPP 7; PA 1
Gampaha	Gampaha	36	National People's Power	NPP 22; SJB 6; SLPP 4; UNP 2; PA 1; NFF 1
Gampaha	Ja-Ela	43	National People's Power	NPP 27; SJB 8; SLPP 4; PA 2; SB 2
Gampaha	Katana	41	National People's Power	NPP 22; SJB 7; SLPP 5; PA 2; Ind 2; SB 2; UNP 1
Gampaha	Kelaniya	43	National People's Power	NPP 24; SJB 7; SLPP 5; SB 4; UNP 2; PA 1
Gampaha	Mahara	55	National People's Power	NPP 33; SJB 10; PA 5; SB 4; UNP 3
Gampaha	Mirigama	52	National People's Power	NPP 29; SJB 11; SLPP 4; NPPT 3; UNP 2; PA 2; SB 1
Gampaha	Minuwangoda	46	National People's Power	NPP 27; SJB 10; SLPP 6; PA 2; SB 1
Gampaha	Wattala	36	National People's Power	NPP 19; SJB 11; SB 2; SLPP 2; UNP 1; PA 1
Kalutara	Agalawatta	20	Samagi Jana Balawegaya	SJB 6; NPP 6; Ind 3; SLPP 2; PA 1; UNP 1; SB 1
Kalutara	Bandaragama	34	National People's Power	NPP 16; SJB 7; PA 4; SLPP 3; UNP 2; NFF 1; ACMC 1
Kalutara	Beruwala	43	National People's Power	NPP 20; SJB 10; SLPP 5; PA 3; UNP 3; NLNP 1; NFF 1
Kalutara	Bulathsinhala	25	National People's Power	NPP 9; SJB 6; Ind 6; SLPP 3; UNP 1
Kalutara	Dodangoda	25	National People's Power	NPP 12; SJB 5; Ind 3; SB 2; SLPP 1; UNP 1; NFF 1
Kalutara	Horana	55	National People's Power	NPP 30; SJB 9; SLPP 5; UNP 4; SB 4; Ind 3
Kalutara	Kalutara	32	National People's Power	NPP 15; SJB 6; PA 4; SLPP 2; UNP 1; NFF 1; NLNP 1; PSA 1; SB 1
Kalutara	Madurawela	15	National People's Power	NPP 5; SJB 3; UNP 3; SLPP 2; Ind 1; PA 1
Kalutara	Mathugama	33	National People's Power	NPP 13; SJB 10; Ind 4; SLPP 3; NFF 1; UNP 1; PSA 1
Kalutara	Millaniya	21	National People's Power	NPP 9; SJB 5; PA 3; SLPP 3; NPPT 1
Kalutara	Palindanuwara	23	Samagi Jana Balawegaya	SJB 9; NPP 7; Ind 3; SLPP 2; PA 1; SB 1
Kalutara	Panadura	46	National People's Power	NPP 22; SJB 9; SLPP 6; UNP 3; SB 3; Ind 1; PA 1; ACMC 1
Kalutara	Walallawita	26	National People's Power	NPP 12; SJB 6; SLPP 3; UNP 2; PA 1; SB 1; PSA 1

Pradeshiya Sabhas of Sri Lanka: Central Province

Pradeshiya Sabhas of Sri Lanka: Central Province
District	Pradeshiya Sabha	No. of seats	Party with most votes	Seat distribution
Kandy	Akurana	30	Samagi Jana Balawegaya	SJB 13; NPP 10; Ind-2 2; UNP 1; SLPP 1; SLMC 1; UNA 1; Ind-1 1
Kandy	Ganga Ihala Korale	24	National People's Power	NPP 13; SJB 5; Ind-1 3; SLPP 1; SB 1; Ind-2 1
Kandy	Harispattuwa	37	National People's Power	NPP 20; SJB 8; SB 3; SLPP 3; PA 1; URF 1; UNA 1
Kandy	Kandy Four Gravets and Gangawata Korale	23	National People's Power	NPP 13; SJB 5; SLPP 2; UNP 2; SB 1
Kandy	Kundasale	44	National People's Power	NPP 24; SJB 9; UNP 3; SLPP 2; Ind 2; PA 2; SB 2
Kandy	Medadumbara	33	National People's Power	NPP 16; SJB 8; SB 2; SLPP 2; UNA 2; UNP 1; DLF 1; PA 1
Kandy	Minipe	23	National People's Power	NPP 11; SJB 6; SLPP 3; Ind 1; UNA 1; SB 1
Kandy	Panwila	16	Samagi Jana Balawegaya	SJB 6; NPP 5; CWC 2; SLPP 1; PA 1; SB 1
Kandy	Pasbage Korale	21	National People's Power	NPP 10; SJB 3; Ind-1 3; Ind-2 2; UNA 1; UNP 1; SLPP 1
Kandy	Pathadumbara	31	National People's Power	NPP 16; SJB 8; SLPP 4; SLMC 1; SB 1; PA 1
Kandy	Pathahewaheta	43	National People's Power	NPP 18; SJB 12; PA 3; UNP 3; SLPP 3; SB 2; UNA 1; CWC 1
Kandy	Poojapitiya	29	National People's Power	NPP 15; SJB 8; SLPP 2; PA 2; Ind 1; UNA 1
Kandy	Thumpane	32	National People's Power	NPP 17; SJB 7; SLPP 2; SB 2; UNA 2; UNP 1; PA 1
Kandy	Udadumbara	16	Samagi Jana Balawegaya	SJB 6; NPP 6; SB 1; SLPP 1; Ind 1; UNP 1
Kandy	Udapalatha	46	National People's Power	NPP 18; SJB 11; PA 6; UNP 4; SLPP 3; SB 2; Ind 1; CWC 1
Kandy	Udunuwara	38	National People's Power	NPP 18; SJB 10; UNA 3; UNP 3; SLPP 2; Ind 2
Kandy	Yatinuwara	46	National People's Power	NPP 23; SJB 9; Ind 4; SLPP 3; UNP 2; PA 2; UNA 1; SB 1; URF 1
Matale	Ambanganga Korale	18	Samagi Jana Balawegaya	SJB 8; NPP 5; SLPP 2; CWC 1; SB 1; UNP 1
Matale	Dambulla	27	National People's Power	NPP 13; SJB 6; SLPP 3; PA 3; UNP 1; SB 1
Matale	Galewela	29	National People's Power	NPP 14; SJB 7; SLPP 3; UNP 3; SB 1; Ind 1
Matale	Laggala–Pallegama	16	Samagi Jana Balawegaya	SJB 6; NPP 6; SLPP 3; SB 1
Matale	Matale	34	National People's Power	NPP 18; SJB 8; SLPP 3; UNP 2; NFF 1; CWC 1; SB 1
Matale	Naula	18	National People's Power	NPP 9; SJB 4; SLPP 2; SB 1; UNP 1; URF 1
Matale	Pallepola	17	National People's Power	NPP 9; SJB 3; SLPP 2; UNP 1; PA 1; SB 1
Matale	Rattota	27	National People's Power	NPP 11; SJB 5; UNP 4; SLPP 2; CWC 2; SB 1; DPF 1; PSA 1
Matale	Ukuwela	27	National People's Power	NPP 11; SJB 7; UNP 3; SLPP 2; PA 1; SB 1; PSA 1; UNA 1
Matale	Wilgamuwa	19	National People's Power	NPP 10; SJB 3; SLPP 3; PA 1; UNP 1; SB 1
Matale	Yatawatta	18	National People's Power	NPP 10; SJB 3; SLPP 3; UNP 1; SB 1
Nuwara Eliya	Agarapathana	15	National People's Power	NPP 4; CWC 4; SJB 4; ERDF 1; DNF 1; UNP 1
Nuwara Eliya	Ambagamuwa	21	National People's Power	NPP 8; SJB 6; CWC 2; SLPP 1; UNP 1; Ind 1; SB 1; ERDF 1
Nuwara Eliya	Hanguranketha	42	National People's Power	NPP 20; SJB 9; SLPP 4; UNP 3; CWC 2; SB 1; PA 1; WNF 1; Ind 1
Nuwara Eliya	Kotagala	16	Ceylon Workers' Congress	CWC 5; NPP 5; SJB 4; DNA 1; ERDF 1
Nuwara Eliya	Kothmale	55	National People's Power	NPP 22; SJB 17; CWC 8; SLPP 4; SB 1; PA 1
Nuwara Eliya	Maskeliya	17	National People's Power	NPP 7; SJB 6; Ind 2; UNP 2
Nuwara Eliya	Norwood	20	Ceylon Workers' Congress	CWC 6; NPP 6; SJB 5; UNP 1; DNA 1; Ind 1
Nuwara Eliya	Nuwara Eliya	24	National People's Power	NPP 7; CWC 6; SJB 5; Ind 2; UNP 1; SLPP 1; DNA 1; PSA 1
Nuwara Eliya	Walapane	64	National People's Power	NPP 30; SJB 15; SLPP 7; UNP 5; PA 4; SB 3

Pradeshiya Sabhas of Sri Lanka: Southern Province

Pradeshiya Sabhas of Sri Lanka: Southern Province
District	Pradeshiya Sabha	No. of seats	Party with most votes	Seat distribution
Galle	Akmeemana	29	National People's Power	NPP 16; SJB 5; SLPP 3; Ind-2 2; UNP 1; Ind-3 1; SB 1
Galle	Ambalangoda	22	National People's Power	NPP 11; SJB 5; SLPP 3; Ind 2; UNP 1
Galle	Baddegama	35	National People's Power	NPP 16; SJB 8; SLPP 4; UNP 2; SB 2; Ind 1; PSA 1; SLCP 1
Galle	Balapitiya	34	National People's Power	NPP 16; SLPP 6; SJB 5; UNP 4; SLCP 2; PA 1
Galle	Benthota	23	National People's Power	NPP 10; SJB 5; Ind-2 2; Ind-1 2; SLPP 2; PA 1; UNP 1
Galle	Bope-Poddala	21	National People's Power	NPP 11; SJB 4; SLPP 3; UNP 2; Ind 1
Galle	Elpitiya	30	National People's Power	NPP 15; SJB 6; SLPP 3; PA 2; Ind 2; PUFA 1; NPPa 1; (Note: 2024 Elpitiya Pradeshiya Sabha election was held on 26 October 2024.)
Galle	Habaraduwa	27	National People's Power	NPP 14; SJB 6; SLPP 5; UNP 1; SP 1
Galle	Imaduwa	18	National People's Power	NPP 10; SJB 4; SLPP 2; UNP 1; SLCP 1
Galle	Karandeniya	21	National People's Power	NPP 12; SJB 3; SLPP 3; UNP 1; SB 1; PSA 1
Galle	Nagoda	26	National People's Power	NPP 11; SJB 6; SLPP 5; UNP 2; PA 1; SB 1
Galle	Neluwa	16	National People's Power	NPP 6; SJB 5; SLPP 3; UNP 1; SB 1
Galle	Niyagama	18	National People's Power	NPP 9; SJB 4; SLPP 3; UNP 1; PA 1
Galle	Rajgama	32	National People's Power	NPP 14; SJB 6; SLPP 4; UNP 2; NLNP 2; SB 1; Ind-2 1; PA 1; Ind-1 1
Galle	Thawalama	20	National People's Power	NPP 10; SJB 4; SLPP 3; SB 2; UNP 1
Galle	Welivitiya-Divithura	15	National People's Power	NPP 7; SJB 4; SLPP 2; SB 1; UNP 1
Galle	Yakkalamulla	23	National People's Power	NPP 12; SJB 5; SLPP 3; UNP 2; SB 1
Matara	Akuressa	23	National People's Power	NPP 13; SJB 5; SLPP 4; SLCP 1
Matara	Athuraliya	17	National People's Power	NPP 9; SJB 4; SLPP 2; PPP 2
Matara	Devinuwara	11	National People's Power	NPP 12; SJB 5; PA 2; SLPP 2; PPP1
Matara	Dickwella	27	National People's Power	NPP 15; SJB 8; PA 2; SLPP 1; UNP 1
Matara	Hakmana	19	National People's Power	NPP 10; SLPP 3; SJB 3; PPP 2; PA 1
Matara	Kamburupitiya	16	National People's Power	NPP 8; SJB 4; SLPP 2; PPP 2
Matara	Kirinda-Puhulwella	11	National People's Power	NPP 6; SJB 3; PPP 1; SLPP 1
Matara	Kotapola	25	National People's Power	NPP 13; SJB 6; SLPP 3; PA 2; URF 1
Matara	Malimbada	18	National People's Power	NPP 9; SJB 4; SLPP 2; PPP 1; UNP 1; PA 1
Matara	Matara	29	National People's Power	NPP 17; SJB 6; SLPP 3; SLCP 1; PA 1; UNP 1
Matara	Mulatiyana	23	National People's Power	NPP 10; SLPP 5; SJB 4; SB 1; PPP 1; PA 1; UNP 1
Matara	Pasgoda	30	National People's Power	NPP 16; SJB 7; SLPP 6; SB 1
Matara	Pitabeddara	23	National People's Power	NPP 12; SJB 4; UNP 3; SLPP 3; SLCP 1
Matara	Thihagoda	17	National People's Power	NPP 9; SJB 3; PPP 2; SLPP 2; PA 1
Matara	Weligama	45	National People's Power	NPP 22; SJB 9; SLPP 6; Ind 3; UNP 2; SB 2; PA 1
Hambantota	Ambalantota	31	National People's Power	NPP 17; SJB 5; SLPP 5; PA 3; UNP 1
Hambantota	Angunakolapelessa	20	National People's Power	NPP 11; SJB 3; SLPP 3; PA 2; SB 1
Hambantota	Beliatta	29	National People's Power	NPP 15; SLPP 7; SJB 4; PA 2; SB 1
Hambantota	Hambantota	15	National People's Power	NPP 8; SJB 4; SLPP 2; SB 1
Hambantota	Katuwana	33	National People's Power	NPP 16; SLPP 6; SJB 5; PA 2; SB 2; UNP 1; URF 1
Hambantota	Lunugamvehera	18	National People's Power	NPP 9; SJB 5; SLPP 2; PA 1; SB 1
Hambantota	Sooriyawewa	11	National People's Power	NPP 6; SJB 2; SLPP 2; PA 1
Hambantota	Tangalle	27	National People's Power	NPP 15; SJB 5; SLPP 4; PA 1; SB 1; UNP 1
Hambantota	Thissamaharama	22	National People's Power	NPP 13; SJB 4; SLPP 3; SB 1; PA 1
Hambantota	Weeraketiya	38	National People's Power	NPP 19; SJB 6; SLPP 6; PA 3; SB 1; UNP 1; NFF 1; JSP 1

Pradeshiya Sabhas of Sri Lanka: Northern Province

Pradeshiya Sabhas of Sri Lanka: Northern Province
District	Pradeshiya Sabha	No. of seats	Party with most votes	Seat distribution
Jaffna	Chavakachcheri	28	Ilankai Tamil Arasu Kachchi	ITAK 8; ACTC 7; NPP 6; DTNA 5; TMK 1; EPDP 1
Jaffna	Delft	13	Ilankai Tamil Arasu Kachchi	ITAK 6; EPDP 4; NPP 2; ACTC 1
Jaffna	Karainagar	11	Independent Group	Ind 2; NPP 2; TMK 2; ACTC 2; UNP 2; ITAK 1
Jaffna	Kayts	13	Eelam People's Democratic Party	EPDP 4; ACTC 3; NPP 3; ITAK 2; DTNA 1
Jaffna	Nallur	10	Ilankai Tamil Arasu Kachchi	ITAK 7; TMK 6; NPP 3; DTNA 3; EPDP 1
Jaffna	Point Pedro	20	Ilankai Tamil Arasu Kachchi	ITAK 9; NPP 4; DTNA 4; Ind 2; EPDP 1
Jaffna	Vadamarachchi South West	32	Ilankai Tamil Arasu Kachchi	ITAK 13; ACTC 7; NPP 6; DTNA 4; EPDP 2
Jaffna	Valikamam East	36	Ilankai Tamil Arasu Kachchi	ITAK 11; NPP 9; ACTC 5; DTNA 5; Ind-1 2; TMK 2; EPDP 1; Ind-2 1
Jaffna	Valikamam North	35	Ilankai Tamil Arasu Kachchi	ITAK 11; NPP 9; ACTC 6; DTNA 3; EPDP 3; SJB 2; TMK 1
Jaffna	Valikamam South	31	Ilankai Tamil Arasu Kachchi	ITAK 13; DTNA 6; ACTC 6; NPP 5; EPDP 1
Jaffna	Valikamam South West	28	Ilankai Tamil Arasu Kachchi	ITAK 8; NPP 6; DTNA 5; ACTC 4; TMK 2; EPDP 2; SJB 1
Jaffna	Valikamam West	26	Ilankai Tamil Arasu Kachchi	ITAK 10; ACTC 6; NPP 4; DTNA 2; EPDP 2; UNP 1; Ind 1
Jaffna	Velanai	22	Ilankai Tamil Arasu Kachchi	ITAK 8; NPP 4; EPDP 3; ACTC 2; Ind-1 1; TMK 1; Ind-2 1; UNP 1; Ind-3 1
Kilinochchi	Karachchi	37	Ilankai Tamil Arasu Kachchi	ITAK 20; NPP 6; DTNA 4; ACTC 2; SJB 2; Ind 2; EPDP 1
Kilinochchi	Pachchilaipalli	13	Ilankai Tamil Arasu Kachchi	ITAK 6; DTNA 3; NPP 3; ACTC 1
Kilinochchi	Poonakary	20	Ilankai Tamil Arasu Kachchi	ITAK 10; DTNA 3; NPP 3; EPDP 1; Ind-1 1; Ind-2 1; ACTC 1
Mannar	Mannar	22	Samagi Jana Balawegaya	SJB 4; DTNA 4; NPP 3; ITAK 5; SLMC 2; SLLP 2; ACTC 1; Ind 1; (Note: SJB obtained 3,520 votes, winning three wards with a vote share of 20.14%. DTNA received 3,400 votes, winning three wards with a vote share of 19.45%. ITAK received 2,577 votes, winning four wards with a vote share of 14.74%. According to the MMPR calculation, four seats each were allocated to SJB and DTNA. ITAK was allocated five seats.)
Mannar	Manthai West	21	Ilankai Tamil Arasu Kachchi	ITAK 5; SJB 4; DTNA 4; NPP 4; SLLP 2; ACTC 1; SLMC 1
Mannar	Musali	16	Samagi Jana Balawegaya	SJB 5; SLLP 4; NPP 3; SLMC 2; Ind 1; DTNA 1
Mannar	Nanaddan	17	National People's Power	NPP 6; ITAK 4; SJB 2; Ind 2; DTNA 2; SLLP 1
Vavuniya	Vavuniya North	23	National People's Power	NPP 6; ITAK 5; ACTC 4; DTNA 3; SLLP 2; SJB 2; SB 1
Vavuniya	Vavuniya South Sinhala	17	National People's Power	NPP 7; SJB 4; SB 1; SLLP 1; Ind 2; SLLP 1; UNP 1
Vavuniya	Vavuniya South Tamil	27	National People's Power	NPP 6; ITAK 5; DTNA 3; SJB 3; SLLP 2; DNA 2; ACTC 1; TMK 1; Ind-2 1; EPDP 1; SB 1; Ind-3 1
Vavuniya	Venkalacheddikulam	18	Samagi Jana Balawegaya	SJB 4; NPP 3; ITAK 3; DTNA 2; SLLP 2; DNA 2; SLMC 1; Ind 1
Mullaitivu	Manthai East	13	Ilankai Tamil Arasu Kachchi	ITAK 4; SJB 3; ACTC 2; NPP 2; DTNA 2
Mullaitivu	Maritime Pattu	21	Ilankai Tamil Arasu Kachchi	ITAK 7; NPP 5; DTNA 4; SJB 2; Ind 1; SLLP 1; UNA 1
Mullaitivu	Puthukkudiyiruppu	22	Ilankai Tamil Arasu Kachchi	ITAK 11; NPP 4; DTNA 2; Ind 2; ACTC 1; SJB 1; SLLP 1
Mullaitivu	Thunukkai	13	Ilankai Tamil Arasu Kachchi	ITAK 4; ACTC 3; DTNA 2; SJB 1; NPP 1; Ind 1; SLLP 1

Pradeshiya Sabhas of Sri Lanka: Eastern Province

Pradeshiya Sabhas of Sri Lanka: Eastern Province
District	Pradeshiya Sabha	No. of seats	Party with most votes	Seat distribution
Batticaloa	Eravur Pattu	32	Ilankai Tamil Arasu Kachchi	ITAK 13; NPP 5; TMVP 4; UNP 2; SLMC 2; Ind-1 1; ACTC 1; DTNA 1; Ind-2 1; SJB 1
Batticaloa	Koralaipattu	26	Ilankai Tamil Arasu Kachchi	ITAK 10; NPP 4; TMVP 4; SLMC 4; SJB 3; DTNA 1
Batticaloa	Koralaipattu North	19	Tamil Makkal Viduthalai Pulikal	TMVP 7; ITAK 6; NPP 3; SLMC 2; SJB 1
Batticaloa	Koralaipattu West	19	Samagi Jana Balawegaya	SJB 8; SLMC 6; NPP 2; Ind 1; ITAK 1; UNP 1
Batticaloa	Manmunai Pattu	17	Ilankai Tamil Arasu Kachchi	ITAK 6; NPP 4; SJB 1; UNA 1; NFGG 1; DTNA 1; TMVP 1; Ind-2 1; Ind-3 1
Batticaloa	Manmunai South and Eruvil Pattu	20	Ilankai Tamil Arasu Kachchi	ITAK 8; NPP 6; TMVP 2; DTNA 1; SJB 1; Ind-2 1; Ind-1 1
Batticaloa	Manmunai South West	16	Ilankai Tamil Arasu Kachchi	ITAK 6; TMVP 6; Ind 3; NPP 1
Batticaloa	Manmunai West	19	Ilankai Tamil Arasu Kachchi	ITAK 10; TMVP 3; NPP 3; DTNA 1; ACTC 1; SJB 1
Batticaloa	Porativu Pattu	16	Ilankai Tamil Arasu Kachchi	ITAK 8; TMVP 5; NPP 3
Ampara	Addalachchenai	18	Sri Lanka Muslim Congress	SLMC 8; SCMC 4; NPP 3; NC 2; SJB 1
Ampara	Akkaraipattu	9	National Congress	NC 5; SLMC 1; NPP 1; Ind 1; ACMC 1
Ampara	Alayadiwembu	16	Ilankai Tamil Arasu Kachchi	ITAK 7; NPP 7; Ind 2
Ampara	Damana	18	National People's Power	NPP 10; SJB 4; SLPP 2; UNP 2
Ampara	Dehiattakandiya	41	National People's Power	NPP 19; SJB 10; SLPP 5; SB 4; UNP 2; PA 1
Ampara	Irakkamam	13	Sri Lanka Muslim Congress	SLMC 4; NPP 3; ACMC 2; Ind-2 1; PA 1; NC 1; Ind 1
Ampara	Karaithivu	11	Ilankai Tamil Arasu Kachchi	ITAK 4; NPP 3; SLMC 2; ACMC 1; Ind 1
Ampara	Lahugala	18	National People's Power	NPP 8; SJB 7; SLPP 3
Ampara	Mahaoya	18	National People's Power	NPP 7; SJB 4; UNP 3; SLPP 3; SB 1
Ampara	Namaloya	16	National People's Power	NPP 8; SJB 5; SLPP 2; SB 1
Ampara	Navithanveli	13	Ilankai Tamil Arasu Kachchi	ITAK 5; Ind-4 2; Ind-1 2; Ind-3 1; SLMC 1; ACMC 1; NPP 1
Ampara	Ninthavur	13	All Ceylon Makkal Congress	ACMC 6; SLMC 4; NPP 2; SJB 1
Ampara	Padiyathalawa	20	National People's Power	NPP 7; SJB 6; SLPP 3; SB 2; PA 1; UNP 1
Ampara	Pothuvil	20	Independent Group	Ind-4 8; SLMC 5; ITAK 2; NPP 2; Ind-1 1; ACMC 1; PA 1
Ampara	Samanthurai	23	All Ceylon Makkal Congress	ACMC 9; SLMC 5; NPP 2; SJB 2; ITAK 1; NC 1; Ind-3 1; Ind-1 1; Ind-2 1
Ampara	Thirukkovil	16	Independent Group	Ind-1 8; ITAK 6; NPP 1; Ind-2 1
Ampara	Uhana	29	National People's Power	NPP 16; SJB 7; SLPP 5; UNP 1
Tricomalee	Gomarankadawala	17	National People's Power	NPP 9; SLPP 3; SJB 3; UNP 1; SB 1
Tricomalee	Kanthale	21	National People's Power	NPP 10; SJB 6; SLPP 2; UNP 1; PA 1; SLMC 1
Tricomalee	Kinniya	14	All Ceylon Makkal Congress	ACMC 5; SJB 3; NPP 2; SLMC 2; NC 1; NFGG 1
Tricomalee	Kuchchaveli	17	Sri Lanka Muslim Congress	SLMC 5; ACMC 4; ITAK 4; SJB 2; NPP 1; Ind 1
Tricomalee	Morawewa	17	National People's Power	NPP 9; SLPP 3; SJB 3; ACMC 1; ITAK 1
Tricomalee	Muttur	22	Sri Lanka Muslim Congress	SLMC 4; ITAK 5; NPP 3; ACMC 3; SJB 2; DTNA 2; NC 1; NFGG 1; Ind 1; (Note: SLMC obtained 6,970 votes, winning three wards with a vote share of 19.9%. ITAK received 5,926 votes, winning five wards with a vote share of 16.92%. According to the MMPR calculation, four seats were allocated to SLMC and five to ITAK.)
Tricomalee	Padavi Sri Pura	17	National People's Power	NPP 9; SJB 3; SLPP 2; PA 2; SB 1
Tricomalee	Seruvila	16	National People's Power	NPP 7; SJB 3; ITAK 1; ACMC 1; SLPP 1; SB 1; SLMC 1; PSA 1
Tricomalee	Thambalagamuwa	16	National People's Power	NPP 3; SJB 3; SLMC 2; ACMC 2; ITAK 2; SLPP 1; UNP 1; ACTC 1; PA 1
Tricomalee	Tricomalee Town and Gravets	20	Ilankai Tamil Arasu Kachchi	ITAK 6; NPP 4; DTNA 3; SJB 2; Ind-4 1; SLMC 1; Ind-5 1; Ind-1 1; ACMC 1
Tricomalee	Verugal	13	Ilankai Tamil Arasu Kachchi	ITAK 8; NPP 3; SJB 2

Pradeshiya Sabhas of Sri Lanka: North Western Province

Pradeshiya Sabhas of Sri Lanka: North Western Province
District	Pradeshiya Sabha	No. of seats	Party with most votes	Seat distribution
Kurunegala	Alawwa	26	National People's Power	NPP 13; SJB 5; SLPP 3; Ind 2; UNP 2; PA 1
Kurunegala	Bingiriya	22	National People's Power	NPP 9; SJB 7; SLPP 4; SB 1; UNP 1
Kurunegala	Galgamuwa	34	National People's Power	NPP 19; SJB 7; SLPP 4; PA 2; UNP 2
Kurunegala	Giribawa	17	National People's Power	NPP 9; SJB 4; SLPP 2; PA 1; UNP 1
Kurunegala	Ibbagamuwa	42	National People's Power	NPP 22; SJB 11; SLPP 4; Ind 2; UNP 1; SB 1; PSA 1
Kurunegala	Kobeigane	17	National People's Power	NPP 8; SJB 5; SLPP 3; UNP 1
Kurunegala	Kuliyapitiya	46	National People's Power	NPP 21; SJB 9; SLPP 6; UNP 4; PA 2; ACMC 2; SLSP 1; SB 1
Kurunegala	Kurunegala	42	National People's Power	NPP 24; SJB 10; SLPP 3; Ind 3; PA 1; SB 1
Kurunegala	Mahawa	37	National People's Power	NPP 19; SJB 8; SLPP 3; FPF 2; UNP 2; Ind 1; SLMP 1; SB 1
Kurunegala	Mawathagama	26	National People's Power	NPP 12; SJB 8; SLPP 4; PA 1; UNP 1
Kurunegala	Narammala	23	National People's Power	NPP 12; SJB 5; SLPP 3; PA 1; UNP 1; ACMC 1
Kurunegala	Nikaweratiya	39	National People's Power	NPP 21; SJB 9; SLPP 6; UNP 2; SB 1
Kurunegala	Panduwasnuwara	38	National People's Power	NPP 17; SJB 12; SLPP 4; Ind 2; UNP 1; ACMC 1; SB 1
Kurunegala	Pannala	42	National People's Power	NPP 20; SJB 11; SLPP 5; PA 4; UNP 2
Kurunegala	Polgahawela	41	National People's Power	NPP 23; SJB 10; SLPP 4; PA 2; Ind 1; SB 1
Kurunegala	Polpithigama	30	National People's Power	NPP 15; SJB 7; SLPP 3; UNP 2; PA 2; SB 1
Kurunegala	Ridigama	39	National People's Power	NPP 21; SJB 8; SLPP 3; UNP 3; ACMC 1; PA 1; SB 1; Ind 1
Kurunegala	Udubaddawa	19	National People's Power	NPP 9; SJB 6; SLPP 3; UNP 1
Kurunegala	Wariyapola	39	National People's Power	NPP 21; SJB 11; SLPP 3; PA 3; SB 1
Puttalam	Anamaduwa	31	National People's Power	NPP 14; SJB 7; SLPP 4; PA 3; SB 2; UNP 1
Puttalam	Arachchikattuwa	22	National People's Power	NPP 10; SJB 6; SLPP 2; PA 2; Ind 1; UNP 1
Puttalam	Chilaw	33	National People's Power	NPP 17; SJB 7; SLPP 4; Ind 3; UNP 1; SB 1
Puttalam	Kalpitiya	32	Samagi Jana Balawegaya	SJB 10; NPP 10; SLPP 3; SLMC 2; SB 2; PA 2; Ind 1; UNP 1; NFGG 1
Puttalam	Karuwalagaswewa	21	National People's Power	NPP 9; SJB 4; PA 3; SLPP 2; SB 1; UNP 1; PSA 1
Puttalam	Nattandiya	41	National People's Power	NPP 22; SJB 9; SLPP 4; PA 4; UNP 1; UNA 1
Puttalam	Nawagattegama	16	National People's Power	NPP 7; SJB 4; SLPP 2; PA 1; Ind 1; UNP 1
Puttalam	Puttalam	25	National People's Power	NPP 8; SJB 4; ACMC 3; SLMC 3; Ind-1 2; SLPP 1; UNP 1; PA 1; NFGG 1; Ind-2 1
Puttalam	Wanathawilluwa	18	National People's Power	NPP 6; SJB 5; SLPP 4; SLMC 1; NFF 1; NFGG 1
Puttalam	Wennappuwa	44	National People's Power	NPP 25; SJB 8; SLPP 8; UNP 2; SB 1

Pradeshiya Sabhas of Sri Lanka: North Central Province

Pradeshiya Sabhas of Sri Lanka: North Central Province
District	Pradeshiya Sabha	No. of seats	Party with most votes	Seat distribution
Anuradhapura	Galenbindunuwewa	20	National People's Power	NPP 11; SJB 4; SLPP 2; PA 1; UNP 1; SB 1
Anuradhapura	Galnewa	17	National People's Power	NPP 10; SJB 3; SLPP 1; UNP 1; SB 1; PA 1
Anuradhapura	Horowpothana	21	National People's Power	NPP 10; SJB 5; Ind 2; SLPP 1; ACMC 1; PA 1; SB 1
Anuradhapura	Ipalogama	16	National People's Power	NPP 8; SJB 5; UNP 1; SLPP 1; SB 1
Anuradhapura	Kahatagasdigiliya	18	National People's Power	NPP 10; SJB 4; SLPP 2; SB 1; UNP 1
Anuradhapura	Kebithigollewa	18	National People's Power	NPP 7; SJB 6; SLPP 3; PA 1; Ind 1
Anuradhapura	Kekirawa	32	National People's Power	NPP 16; SJB 4; SLPP 2; PA 2; UNP 2; Ind-1 1; SB 1; SLMC 1; Ind-2 1; NFF 1; UNA 1
Anuradhapura	Medawachchiya	21	National People's Power	NPP 10; SJB 6; SLPP 2; SB 2; PA 1
Anuradhapura	Mihinthale	18	National People's Power	NPP 10; SJB 3; SLPP 1; PA 1; UNP 1; Ind 1; SB 1
Anuradhapura	Nochchiyagama	22	National People's Power	NPP 12; SJB 5; SLPP 2; UNP 1; SB 1; PA 1
Anuradhapura	Nuwaragam Palatha Central	28	National People's Power	NPP 15; SJB 6; SLPP 3; UNP 2; PA 1; SB 1
Anuradhapura	Nuwaragam Palatha East	18	National People's Power	NPP 11; SJB 4; SLPP 1; UNP 1; PA 1
Anuradhapura	Padaviya	17	National People's Power	NPP 10; SJB 4; SLPP 2; SB 1
Anuradhapura	Palagala	17	National People's Power	NPP 9; SJB 4; SLPP 2; UNP 1; PA 1
Anuradhapura	Rajanganaya	16	National People's Power	NPP 8; SJB 3; PA 2; SLPP 2; UNP 1
Anuradhapura	Rambewa	20	National People's Power	NPP 11; SJB 5; SLPP 2; SB 1; UNA 1
Anuradhapura	Thalawa	34	National People's Power	NPP 20; SJB 6; PA 3; SLPP 2; UNP 2; SB 1
Anuradhapura	Thirappane	17	National People's Power	NPP 9; SJB 4; PA 1; UNP 1; SLPP 1; SB 1
Polonnaruwa	Dimbulagala	23	National People's Power	NPP 13; SJB 6; PA 2; SLPP 1; UNP 1
Polonnaruwa	Elahera	18	National People's Power	NPP 10; SJB 4; SLPP 1; Ind 1; PA 1; UNP 1
Polonnaruwa	Hingurakgoda	34	National People's Power	NPP 20; SJB 7; SLPP 3; PSP 1; PA 1; UNP 1; PSA 1
Polonnaruwa	Lankapura	24	National People's Power	NPP 12; SJB 5; Ind 4; SB 2; SLPP 1
Polonnaruwa	Medirigiriya	33	National People's Power	NPP 19; SJB 8; SLPP 3; SB 2; PA 1
Polonnaruwa	Polonnaruwa	16	National People's Power	NPP 9; SJB 4; UNP 1; SLPP 1; PA 1
Polonnaruwa	Welikanda	17	National People's Power	NPP 8; SJB 4; SLPP 2; PA 2; UNP 1

Pradeshiya Sabhas of Sri Lanka: Uva Province

Pradeshiya Sabhas of Sri Lanka: Uva Province
District	Pradeshiya Sabha	No. of seats	Party with most votes	Seat distribution
Badulla	Badulla	18	National People's Power	NPP 10; SJB 3; PA 2; Ind 1; SLPP 1; SB 1
Badulla	Bandarawela	18	National People's Power	NPP 10; SJB 3; PA 1; UNP 1; SLPP 1; CWC 1; TPA 1
Badulla	Ella	26	National People's Power	NPP 13; SJB 5; PA 4; TPA 1; CWC 1; UNP 1; SLPP 1
Badulla	Haldummulla	21	National People's Power	NPP 9; SJB 6; PA 2; TPA 2; SLPP 1; UNA 1
Badulla	Hali-Ela	46	National People's Power	NPP 23; SJB 7; PA 6; UNP 4; SLPP 3; CWC 2; UCPF 1
Badulla	Haputale	20	National People's Power	NPP 9; SJB 6; UNP 2; PA 1; SLPP 1; TPA 1
Badulla	Kandaketiya	16	National People's Power	NPP 6; SJB 4; SLPP 2; PA 2; SB 1; UNP 1
Badulla	Lunugala	20	National People's Power	NPP 6; SJB 5; PA 3; UNP 3; TPA 2; SLPP 1
Badulla	Mahiyanganya	26	National People's Power	NPP 13; SJB 6; SLPP 3; PA 2; Ind 1; UNP 1
Badulla	Meegahakiuvla	19	National People's Power	NPP 9; SJB 4; PA 2; SLPP 2; SB 1; UNP 1
Badulla	Passara	26	National People's Power	NPP 13; SJB 5; PA 4; SLPP 1; Ind 1; UNP 1; TPA 1
Badulla	Rideemaliyadda	18	National People's Power	NPP 9; SJB 6; SLPP 2; UNP 1
Badulla	Soranathota	16	National People's Power	NPP 6; SJB 4; PA 2; SLPP 2; SB 1; UNP 1
Badulla	Uva-Paranagama	41	National People's Power	NPP 20; SJB 8; SLPP 5; UNP 3; PA 3; SB 1; PSA 1
Badulla	Welimada	44	National People's Power	NPP 22; SJB 10; PA 3; SLPP 3; SLMC 2; UNP 2; UNA 1; SB 1
Monaragala	Badalkumbura	20	National People's Power	NPP 10; SJB 5; SLPP 3; PA 1; UNP 1
Monaragala	Bibila	18	National People's Power	NPP 10; SJB 4; PA 1; SLPP 1; UNP 1; SB 1
Monaragala	Buttala	18	National People's Power	NPP 8; SJB 6; SLPP 2; UNP 1; PA 1
Monaragala	Kataragama	16	National People's Power	NPP 9; SJB 4; SLPP 2; NFF 1
Monaragala	Madulla	21	National People's Power	NPP 11; SJB 4; SLPP 3; UNP 1; PA 1; SB 1
Monaragala	Medagama	17	National People's Power	NPP 8; SJB 4; PA 2; SLPP 1; SB 1; UNP 1
Monaragala	Monaragala	20	National People's Power	NPP 11; SJB 4; SLPP 2; PA 2; SB 1
Monaragala	Siyambalanduwa	24	National People's Power	NPP 12; SJB 6; SLPP 3; PA 1; UNP 1; SB 1
Monaragala	Thanamalvila	34	National People's Power	NPP 16; SJB 9; SLPP 4; PA 3; UNP 2
Monaragala	Wellawaya	26	National People's Power	NPP 13; SJB 7; SLPP 3; PA 1; SB 1; UNP 1

Pradeshiya Sabhas of Sri Lanka: Sabaragamuwa Province

Pradeshiya Sabhas of Sri Lanka: Sabaragamuwa Province
District	Pradeshiya Sabha	No. of seats	Party with most votes	Seat distribution
Ratnapura	Ayagama	16	National People's Power	NPP 6; SJB 5; SLCP 3; SLPP 1; UNP 1
Ratnapura	Balangoda	37	National People's Power	NPP 20; SJB 11; SLPP 5; DPF 1
Ratnapura	Eheliyagoda	36	National People's Power	NPP 18; SJB 5; SLPP 3; PA 3; UNP 2; SLMP 2; SB 1; Ind 1; DLF 1
Ratnapura	Embilipitiya	32	National People's Power	NPP 17; SJB 6; SLPP 3; SB 2; UNP 2; NFF 1; DLF 1
Ratnapura	Godakawela	32	National People's Power	NPP 15; SJB 9; SLPP 3; PA 2; UNP 2; SB 1
Ratnapura	Imbulpe	25	National People's Power	NPP 14; SJB 5; SLPP 3; Ind 2; UNP 1
Ratnapura	Kahawatta	16	National People's Power	NPP 6; SJB 4; SLPP 2; UNP 1; DPF 1; PA 1; CWC 1
Ratnapura	Kalawana	19	National People's Power	NPP 10; SJB 3; SLPP 2; PA 1; SB 1; UNP 1; NFF 1
Ratnapura	Kolonna	19	National People's Power	NPP 9; SJB 5; SLPP 3; UNP 1; SB 1
Ratnapura	Kuruwita	46	National People's Power	NPP 20; UNP 10; SLPP 6; PA 3; Ind-1 2; Ind-2 2; UNP 2; DLF 1
Ratnapura	Nivithigala	24	National People's Power	NPP 9; SJB 7; SLPP 4; UNP 2; PA 1; NFF 1
Ratnapura	Pelmadulla	37	National People's Power	NPP 16; SJB 11; SLPP 5; UNP 2; DPF 1; SB 1; PA 1
Ratnapura	Ratnapura	39	National People's Power	NPP 16; SJB 9; SLPP 6; PA 3; UNP 2; DPF 2; NFF 1
Ratnapura	Weligepola	18	National People's Power	NPP 7; SJB 6; SLPP 2; PA 1; SB 1; UNP 1
Kegalle	Aranayaka	30	National People's Power	NPP 13; SJB 8; SB 3; SLPP 2; UNP 2; PA 1; PSA 1
Kegalle	Bulathkohupitiya	19	National People's Power	NPP 8; SJB 5; SLPP 3; SB 2; PA 1
Kegalle	Dehiowita	36	National People's Power	NPP 16; SLB 9; SLPP 3; Ind 2; PA 2; UNP 1; SLCP 1; NFF 1; DPF 1
Kegalle	Deraniyagala	21	National People's Power	NPP 8; SJB 7; PA 2; SLPP 2; UNP 1; SB 1
Kegalle	Galigamuwa	36	National People's Power	NPP 18; SJB 9; SLPP 3; UNP 2; PA 2; SB 2
Kegalle	Kegalle	34	National People's Power	NPP 19; SJB 6; SLPP 4; SB 1; PA 1; UNP 1; Ind 1; PSA 1
Kegalle	Mawanella	42	National People's Power	NPP 19; SJB 11; PA 3; UNP 3; SLPP 3; SB 2; UNFF 1
Kegalle	Rambukkana	38	National People's Power	NPP 21; SLPP 5; SJB 5; UNP 4; SB 2; Ind 1
Kegalle	Ruwanwella	32	National People's Power	NPP 17; SJB 8; SLPP 3; Ind 1; UNP 1; PA 1; SB 1
Kegalle	Warakapola	45	National People's Power	NPP 25; SJB 9; SLPP 5; PA 3; UNP 2; SB 1
Kegalle	Yatiyanthota	30	National People's Power	NPP 12; SJB 9; SLPP 3; DPF 2; UNP 1; Ind 1; PA 1; SB 1

== Notes ==
Election results
