= Harispattuwa Pradeshiya Sabha =

Local authority in Kandy, Sri Lanka

harispattuwa Divisional Council හාරිස්පත්තුව ප්‍රාදේශීය සභාව

Type
- Type: Local authority

Leadership
- Chairman: Ananda Jayawilal since February 2018

Structure
- Seats: 37
- Political groups: Government (20): NPP (20); Opposition (17): SJB (8); SB (3); SLPP (3); PA (1); URF (1); UNA (1)

Elections
- Last election: 9 May 2025
- Next election: TBD

Harispattuwa Pradeshiya Sabha (Sinhala: හාරිස්පත්තුව ප්‍රාදේශීය සභාව) is the local authority for Harispattuwa Divisional Secretariat Division in Kandy district, Sri Lanka. Sri Lanka Podujana Peramuna currently holds the power by winning the 2018 Sri Lankan local elections.

== Wards ==
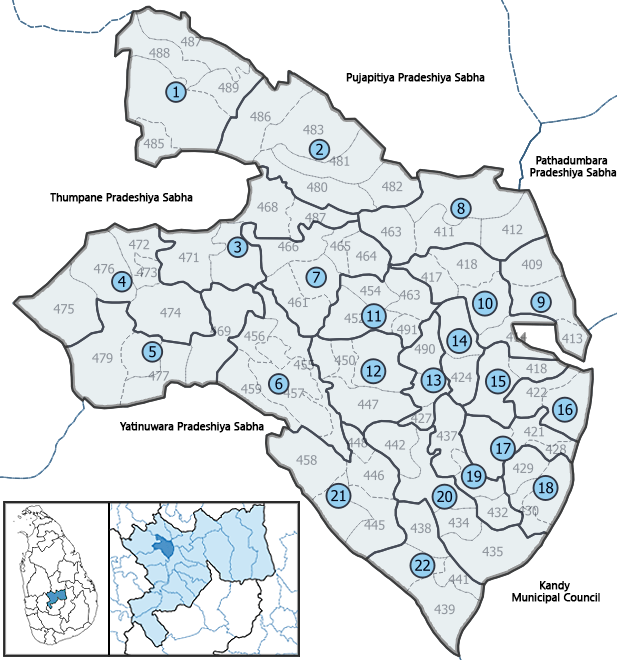
Ward map of Harispattuwa pradeshiya sabha

2018 election introduced a new electoral system to ensure each local community has its own representative. Harispattuwa region was divided into 22 wards based on the existing Grama niladhari division boundaries and winner from each ward elected directly to the local authority.

1. Medawala (මැදවල)
2. Attaragama (අත්තරගම)
3. Gonigoda (ගෝනිගොඩ)
4. Hedeniya (හෑදෙනිය)
5. Karanduwawala (කරඬුවාවල)
6. Hiriyalagammana (හිරියාලගම්මන)
7. Thiththapajjala (තිත්තපජ්ජල)
8. Hapugoda (හපුගොඩ)
9. Ranawana (රණවන)
10. Uduwawala (උඩුවාවල)
11. Nugawela (නුගවෙල)
12. Kulugammana (කුළුගම්මන)
13. Uguressapitiya (උගුරැස්සපිටිය)
14. Senarathgama (සෙනරත්ගම)
15. Inigala (ඉනිගල)
16. Polwatta (පොල්වත්ත)
17. Hamangoda North (හමංගොඩ උතුර)
18. Gohagoda (ගොහාගොඩ)
19. Hamangoda South (හමංගොඩ දකුණ)
20. Halloluwa (හල්ඔළුව)
21. Yatihalagala Udugama (යටිහලගල උඩුගම)
22. Yatihalagala Pallegama (යටිහලගල පල්ලේගම)

== Election results ==
=== 2018 local government election ===
Party	Ward																						Total	%	Seats		
Party	1	2	3	4	5	6	7	8	9	10	11	12	13	14	15	16	17	18	19	20	21	22	Total	%	_{Won}	_{Bonus}	_{Total}
SLPP	1595	2009	1371	1214	1188	1507	1178	1498	1218	1142	1773	1069	389	863	556	1163	1531	1186	851	1279	1279	995	26,854	49.1%	19	0	19
UNP	957	886	612	1254	721	817	748	888	909	1033	749	726	626	544	579	875	556	551	672	465	708	657	16,663	30.47%	3	8	11
UPFA	91	125	217	96	95	292	399	206	199	408	275	501	487	213	391	302	192	143	309	611	172	370	6,292	11.5%	0	4	4
JVP	35	228	88	64	47	232	118	130	130	118	192	125	134	138	318	248	107	76	108	144	112	102	3,055	5.59%	0	2	2
DMU	2	7	14	387	118	9	10	1	4	7	5	10	332	8	228	55	3	28	48	7	6	0	1,291	2.36%	0	1	1
ACMC	7	12	5	9	24	14	23	7	6	10	9	4	255	38	43	46	2	4	4	4	9	4	539	0.99%	0	0	0
Valid Votes																							54,694		22	15	37
Rejected Votes																							1,234	2.20%			
Total Polled																							55,928	80.44%			
Registered																							69,523				

=== 2011 local government election ===
Party	Votes	%	Seats
United People's Freedom Alliance	19,967	53.89%	11
United National Party	13,892	37.5%	6
Independent Group 3	1,553	4.19%	1
Janatha Vimukthi Peramuna	822	2.22%	1
Sri Lanka Muslim Congress	644	1.74%	0
United Socialist Party	135	0.36%	0
Independent Group 2	22	0.06%	0
Independent Group 1	15	0.04%	0
Valid Votes	37,050	100.00%	19
Rejected Votes	1,915	4.91%	
Total Polled	38,965	60.72%	
Registered Electors	64,172		

=== 2006 local government election ===
Party	Votes	%	Seats
United People's Freedom Alliance	17,380	49.65%	7
United National Party	12,411	35.46%	4
Janatha Vimukthi Peramuna	3,371	9.63%	1
Jathika Hela Urumaya	981	2.80	0
United Socialist Party	761	2.17%	0
Independent Group	99	0.28%	0
Valid Votes	35,003	100.00%	12
Rejected Votes	1,724	4.69%	
Total Polled	36,727	62.49%	
Registered Electors	58,776		
