= Panadura Urban Council =

Local government in Kalutara Dist., Sri Lanka

Panadura Urban Council: පාණදුර නගර සභාව (Sinhala); பனதுரா நகர சபை (Tamil)
- Seal of the Panadura Urban Council

Type
- Type: Local Authority
- Term limits: 4 years

History
- Founded: 1923; 102 years ago

Leadership
- Chairman: L.R.Hemakumara Prera, (NPP) since 6 May 2025
- Vice Chairman: H.Rajitha Pradeep Kumara Fernando, (NPP) since 6 May 2025

Structure
- Seats: 18
- Political groups: Government: NPP (10); Opposition: SJB (2); SLPP (2); UNP (1); NLBP (1); NFF (1); SB (1)

Elections
- Last election: 6 May 2025
- Next election: TBA

Website
- https://panadura.uc.gov.lk

Panadura Urban Council (Sinhala: පාණදුර නගර සභාව, Tamil: பனதுரா நகர சபை) is the local authority for Panadura and its surrounding suburbs in Kalutara District, Sri Lanka. It has 18 members elected under the mixed electoral system where 60% of members are elected using first-past-the-post voting and the remaining 40% through closed list proportional representation.

== History ==
The Panadura District Town Council was established by a Gazette dated 13 January 1922. Previously, there had been a local governance institution called the Sanitary Board. The newly established Town Council met for the first time in January 1923 at the Panadura Sanitary Board Inspector's office. Dr. E. S. Gunawardena was the first Chairman of a council which comprised six wards and nine councillors. There have been 23 chairpersons in its 101–102 year history.

== Geography ==
The council grew from six to ten wards, and the council boundaries expanded over time with various Gazette notifications. Currently, the council governs an area of 5.8 square kilometres (2.2 sq mi) covering 19 Grama Niladhari divisions, with a total population of 35,803, and 24,166 electors.

Annual rainfall, most heavy during the Southwest Monsoon, is between 3,300 to 4,500 millimetres (130 to 180 in). Low lying wet zone land takes up 8.03% of the total land area, and common crops include rice, rubber, tea, coconut, and fruits and vegetables.

=== Wards ===
For electoral and administrative purposes, the Council is divided into 10 wards.

1. Walana
2. Udahamulla
3. Pattiya North
4. Bazaar Street
5. Walapala Pattiya
6. Wekada North
7. Wekada West
8. Pattiya South
9. Nallooruwa North
10. Nallooruwa
