= Kolonnawa Urban Council =

Local authority in Sri Lanka

Kolonnawa Urban Council: කොලොන්නාව නගර සභාව (Sinhala); கொலோனாவா நகர சபை (Tamil)

Type
- Type: Local Authority

History
- Founded: 1930; 95 years ago

Leadership
- Chairman: Dhammika Wijayamuni, (NPP) since (6 May 2025)
- Vice Chairman: Saman Seneviratne, (NPP) since (6 May 2025)

Structure
- Seats: 19
- Political groups: Government: NPP (9); Opposition: SJB (6); UNP (2); SLPP (1); SB (1)

Elections
- Voting system: Mixed: 60% First-past-the-post; 40% closed list proportional representation
- Last election: 6 May 2025
- Next election: TBA

Kolonnawa Urban Council (Sinhala: කොලොන්නාව නගර සභාව, Tamil: கொலோனாவா நகர சபை) is the local authority for Kolonnawa and surrounding suburbs in Sri Lanka. It has 20 members elected under the mixed electoral system where 60% of members are elected using first-past-the-post voting and the remaining 40% through closed list proportional representation.

== History ==
Originally created in 1930, the Kolonnawa Urban Council came into being as a hub for warehousing and service sector for the nearby Port of Colombo. Traders and retailers working in the various city markets, as well as low-income workers engaged in shipping-related activities were the mainstay of the Kolonnawa populace. In addition to residential areas, a large volume of industrial and commercial buildings such as stores, warehouses, container yards, electricity distribution infrastructure (including the Kelanitissa Power Station) and the Ceylon Petroleum Storage Terminal (Kolonnawa Refinery) are located in the Kolonnawa area.

== Geography ==
The Kolonnawa Urban Council lies on the Southern bank of the Kelani River and covers an area of about 10.06 km^{2} (3.88 sq mi) in extent. Mostly lying in the flood plain of the Kelani River, 70% of the land lies below Sea level. A Flood control dam constructed in 1935 (named the Harward Bund) protects the area south of it from flooding of the river.

The Council is bounded to the West by the Colombo Municipal Council, to the South by Sri Jayawardenapura Kotte Municipal Council, and to the East by the Mulleriyawa Pradeshiya Sabha.

=== Wards ===
For electoral and administrative purposes, the Council is divided into 9 wards:

1. Sedawatta
2. Wadulla
3. Orugodawatta
4. Wellampitiya
5. Dahampura
6. Kolonnawa
7. Singhapura
8. Salamulla
9. Gajabapura

== Demographics ==
Kolonnawa Urban Council is a multi-religious, multi-ethnic, multi-cultural area. The population fell from 57,984 in 1981 to 55,285 in 2001.

Population by Religion (2001)
1. Buddhists (54.6%)
2. Muslims (21.2%)
3. Hindus (16.4%)
4. Christians (7.7%)
5. Other (0.10%)

Religious Identification in Kolonnawa Urban Council area
	Population (2001)	% of Total
Buddhism	30,200	54.6%
Islam	11,756	21.2%
Hinduism	9,069	16.4%
Christianity	4,246	7.7%
Other	14	0.1%
Total	55,285	100.00%
