= Sri Jayawardenepura Kotte Municipal Council =

Sri Jayawardenepura Kotte Municipal Council: ශ්‍රී ජයවර්ධනපුර කෝට්ටේ මහා නගර සභාව (Sinhala); ஸ்ரீ ஜெயவர்தனபுர கோட்டே நகராட்சி மன்றம் (Tamil)

Type
- Type: Local authority
- Term limits: 3 years

History
- Founded: 1940; 86 years ago
- Preceded by: Kotte Urban Council (1940 - 1997)

Leadership
- Mayor: Atapattu Hewa Kankanamage Yudhistira Arosa, (NPP) since May 2025
- Deputy Mayor: Krishanthi Wijebandara, (NPP) since May 2025

Structure
- Seats: 39
- Political groups: Government: National People's Power (21); Opposition: Samagi Jana Balawegaya (7); United People's Freedom Alliance (3); United National Party (2); Sri Lanka Podujana Peramuna (2); Sarvajana Balaya (2); United Republican Front (2); Independents (1)

Elections
- Voting system: Open list proportional representation
- Last election: 6 May 2025
- Next election: TBD

Meeting place
- No. 06, Nawala Road, Rajagiriya

Website
- https://www.kotte.mc.gov.lk

The Sri Jayawardenepura Kotte Municipal Council is the local council for Sri Jayawardenepura Kotte, the administrative capital city of Sri Lanka. The council was first formed as Kotte Urban Development Council which was established in the 1930s and the council became Sri Jayawardenepura Kotte Municipal Council in 1997, Chandra Silva was elected as the first mayor.

Sri Jayawardenepura Kotte Municipal Council area is bounded by the Kolonnawa Urban Council to the North, the Kotikawatta – Mulleriyawa Pradeshiya Sabha to the North East, Kaduwela Municipal Council to the East, Maharagama Urban Council to the South East, Dehiwala-Mount Lavinia Municipal Council to the South West, and Colombo Municipal Council to the West.

== Municipal structure ==
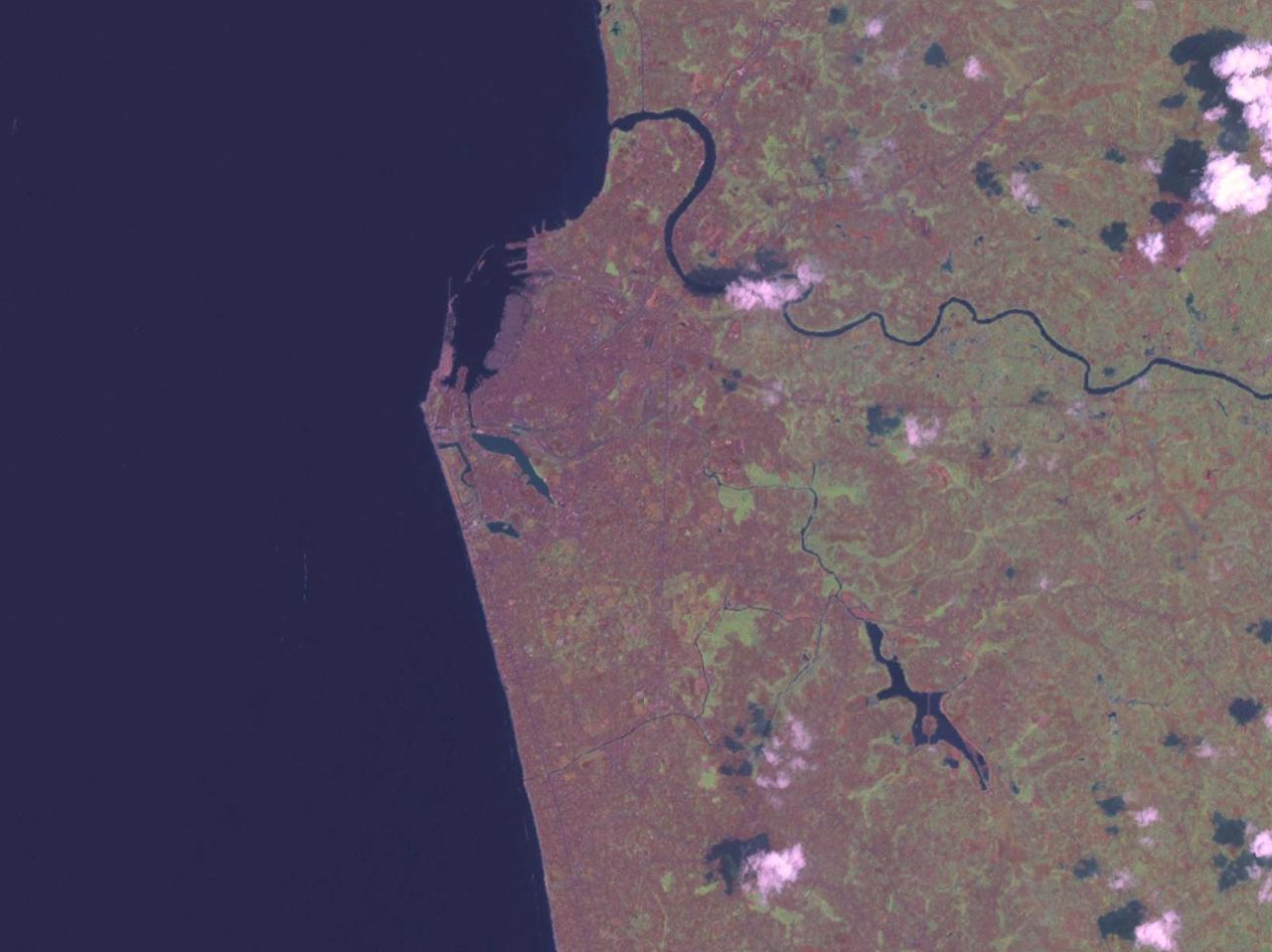
Sri Jayawardenepura Kotte is located at the south east of Colombo.

The Kotte Urban Development Council was created in the 1930s, with a modern building at Rajagiriya. It was succeeded by the Kotte Urban Council, which had a large section of its area removed and tagged onto the Colombo Municipal Council ward of Borella while the Battaramulla urban council was dissolved and a small section of Battaramulla tagged onto the Kotte Urban Council. The Kotte Urban Council became the Sri Jayawardenepura Kotte Municipal Council in 1997, with Chandra Silva as the first Mayor.

There are 20 Members of the Municipal Council (MMCs), elected on proportional representation. There are 18 wards, but these are now merely polling divisions, without individual representation.

Political party	Council members							
Political party	1991	1997	2002	2006	2011	2018	2025	
JVP/NPP	–	1	1	1	–	3	21	21 / 39
SJB	–	–	–	–	–	–	7	7 / 39
PA (Note: As SLFP in 1991 and as UPFA in 2006, 2011 and 2018.)	11	11	8	11	13	5	3	3 / 39
SB	–	–	–	–	–	–	2	2 / 39
SLPP	–	–	–	–	–	18	2	2 / 39
UNP	8	7	11	6	5	12	2	2 / 39
URF	–	–	–	–	–	–	1	1 / 39
UNA	–	–	–	–	–	–	1	1 / 39
LSSP	–	–	–	–	1	–	–	
JHU	–	–	–	1	–	–	–	
MEP	–	1	–	–	–	–	–	
Ind	1	–	–	–	1	–	–	
Total	20	20	20	20	20	38	39	

=== Zones ===
- Pita Kotte
- Ethul Kotte
- Nawala
- Nugegoda
- Rajagiriya

=== Wards ===
Ward No	Ward Name
01	Obesekarapura
02	Moragasmulla
03	Meda Welikada
04	Rajagiriya
05	Bandaranayakapura
06	Nawala West
07	Koswatta
08	Ethulkotte
09	Pitakotte East
10	Pitakotte
11	Pitakotte West
12	Nawala East
13	Nugegoda West
14	Pagoda North
15	Gangodavila East
16	Pagoda South
17	Nugegoda East
18	Gangodavila West

=== Grama Niladhari Division ===
Division No	Division Name
514	Welikada East
514A	Welikada West
514B	Rajagiriya
514C	Obesekarapura
514D	Welikada North
519	Nugegoda
519A	Pagoda
519B	Nugegoda West
519C	Pagoda East
520	Nawala West
520A	Koswatte
520B	Nawala East
521	Ethul Kotte
521A	Ethul Kotte West
522	Pitakotte West
522A	Pitakotte East
522B	Pitakotte
526	Gangodavila North
526A	Gangodavila South
526C	Gangodavila East

== Demographics ==
Sri Jayawardenepura Kotte is a multi-ethnic, multi-religious urban centre. According to the census of 2012 the demographics by ethnicity and religion is as follows:

Population by Religion (2012)
1. Buddhists (77.1%)
2. Catholics (7.28%)
3. Muslims (6.30%)
4. Other Christians (4.69%)
5. Hinduism (4.52%)
6. Other (0.15%)

Religious Identification in Sri Jayawardenepura Kotte Municipality area
	Population (2012)	% of Total
Buddhist	82,841	77.06%
Roman Catholic	7,827	7.28%
Islam	6,772	6.30%
Other Christian	5,040	4.69%
Hindu	4,864	4.52%
Other	164	0.15%
Total	107,508	100.00%

Population by Ethnicity (2012)
1. Sinhalese (84.9%)
2. Sri Lankan Tamils (6.98%)
3. Sri Lankan Moors (4.84%)
4. Other (3.29%)

Ethnic Identification in Sri Jayawardenepura Kotte Municipality area
	Population (2012)	% of Total
Sinhalese	91,268	84.89%
Sri Lankan Tamil	7,503	6.98%
Sri Lankan Moor	5,207	4.84%
Burgher	1,049	0.98%
Other	840	0.78%
Indian Tamil	801	0.75%
Malay	710	0.66%
Sri Lankan Chetty	72	0.07%
Baratha	58	0.05%
Total	107,508	100.00%

== Representation ==
The Sri Jayawardenepura Kotte Municipal Council is divided into 16 wards and is represented by 20 councillors, elected using an open list proportional representation system.

=== 2011 Local government election ===
Results of the local government election held on 8 October 2011.

Alliances and parties	Votes	%	Seats
United People's Freedom Alliance (NC, ACMC, SLFP et al.)	26,723	63.57%	13
United National Party	10,830	25.76%	5
Independent Group 3	2,178	5.18%	1
Lanka Sama Samaja Party	1,291	3.07%	1
Janatha Vimukthi Peramuna	942	2.24%	0
Independent Group 6	28	0.07%	0
Independent Group 1	17	0.042%	0
Independent Group 2	7	0.02%	0
Independent Group 4	7	0.02%	0
Independent Group 1	8	0.01%	0
Independent Group 4	8	0.01%	0
Patriotic National Front	6	0.01%	0
Independent Group 5	5	0.01%	0
Valid Votes	42,034	96.96%	20
Rejected Votes	1,319		
Total Polled	43,353		
Registered Electors	73,486		
Turnout	58.99%		

The Sri Jayawardenepura Kotte Municipal Council has six standing departments each headed by the mayor. The standing committees are Accounts Department, Municipal Engineering Department, Health Development, Veterinary Department, Legal Department and Public Utility Department.
