= Weligama Urban Council =

Sri Lankan local authority

Type
- Type: Local authority

Leadership
- Chairman: Nisantha Pradeep Kumar, (NPP) since 6 May 2025
- Deputy Chairman: Senavirathna Banda, (NPP) since 6 May 2025

Structure
- Seats: 19
- Political groups: Government: NPP (10); Opposition: SJB (3); SLPP (3); UNP (1); SB (1); PA (1)

Elections
- Last election: 6 May 2025
- Next election: TBA

Weligama Urban Council (WUC) is the local authority for the town of Weligama in the Matara District, Southern Province, Sri Lanka. The WUC is responsible for providing a variety of local public services including roads, sanitation, drains, housing, libraries, public parks and recreational facilities. It has 10 councillors elected using an open list proportional representation system.

== Election results ==
=== 2011 local government election ===
Results of the local government election held on 17 March 2011:

Alliances and parties	Votes	%	Seats
United People's Freedom Alliance (NC, ACMC, SLFP et al.)	7,246	63.54%	7
United National Party	3,622	31.76%	3
Sri Lanka Muslim Congress	353	3.1%	0
Janatha Vimukthi Peramuna	164	1.44%	0
Independent 1	11	0.10%	0
Independent 2	2	0.06%	0
Valid Votes	11,403	100.00%	10
Rejected Votes	289		
Total Polled	11,692		
Registered Electors	15,694		
Turnout	74.45%		

The following candidates were elected: Mohomad Husein Hajiyar Muhammad; Arindra Sanath Kumara Pelaketiyage; Thakshila Damayanthi Kaluhennedige; Awarikara Galappatthige Chanaka Dilruk; Muhammadu Ibrahim Muhammadu Nisar; Dodanduwa Lebunahewage Titus Pemanath; Oliver Perera Wickramasingha; Ediriweera Pathmasiri; Mohammad Lafir Muhammad Siyam; and Loronsu Hewa Wellekankanamge Chamila Pushpa Kumara.

Mohomad Husein Hajiyar Muhammad and Arindra Sanath Kumara Pelaketiyage were appointed Chairman and Deputy Chairman respectively.
