= Moratuwa Municipal Council =

Local council for Moratuwa, Sri Lanka

Moratuwa Municipal Council: මොරටුව මහා නගර සභාව (Sinhala); மொறட்டுவை மாநகர சபை (Tamil)

Type
- Type: Local authority
- Term limits: 4 years

History
- Founded: April 15, 1997; 28 years ago
- Preceded by: Moratuwa Urban Council (1930 - 1997)

Leadership
- Commissioner: Manoja S Pathirana

Structure
- Political groups: Government (26): National People's Power (26); Opposition (26): Samagi Jana Balawegaya (11); Sri Lanka Podujana Peramuna (6); United National Party (3); Sarvajana Balaya (2); People's Alliance (2); National Freedom Front (1); Independents (1)

Elections
- Voting system: open list proportional representation system
- Last election: 6 May 2025

Meeting place
- Moratuwa Municipal Council Building, Moratuwa

Website
- http://moratuwa.mc.gov.lk

The Moratuwa Municipal Council (Sinhala: මොරටුව මහා නගර සභාව, Tamil: மொறட்டுவை மாநகர சபை) is the local council for Moratuwa, a large coastal city in Colombo District.

== History ==
In January 1908, the first local government body was established in Moratuwa. It was chaired by the Government Agent, and consisted of 6 representatives: 3 members of the public and 3 Government officials.

In 1930, the Moratuwa Urban Council was established. The gazette was issued in January 1928, elections held in 1929, and the council first met in January 1930. There were 8 wards electing a single representative each, and additionally there were 4 appointed members. In 1942 the number of wards and elected members was increased to 10, and the number of appointed members was reduced to 2.

As per Gazette Notification No. 957/13 dated 8 January 1997, the Moratuwa Municipal Council was established. The change came into effect in April of the same year.

List of Mayors
Name	Term start	Term end
H. Lalith R. J. Nonis	1991	1995
Thomson J. Mendis	1995	1997
A. T. K. Chandradasa	1997	2001
R. A. Annada Kusumsiri	2001	2002
Rawinath J. Gunasekara	2002	2006
W. Samanlal Fernando	2006	2010
W. Samanlal Fernando	2011	2016
W. Samanlal Fernando	2018	2023
Don Nishantha Ferdinando	2025	Present

== Demographics ==
=== Ethnic groups ===
Population by ethnicity (2011)
1. Sinhalese (95.0%)
2. Sri Lankan Tamils (2.50%)
3. Sri Lankan Moors (1.38%)
4. Indian Tamils (0.21%)
5. Other (0.91%)

Population by ethnicity (2011)
Ethnicity	Population	% of total
Sinhalese	168,324	95.00
Sri Lankan Tamils	4,433	2.50
Indian Tamils	375	0.21
Sri Lankan Moors	2,452	1.38
Other (including Burgher, Sri Lankan Malays)	1,606	0.91
Total	177,190	100

=== Religions ===
Population by ethnicity (2011)
1. Buddhists (70.0%)
2. Catholics (19.1%)
3. Other Christians (6.70%)
4. Muslims (1.90%)
5. Hinduism (1.90%)
6. Other (0.40%)

Population by religion (2011)
Religion	Population	% of total
Buddhists	124,205	70.0
Catholics	33,893	19.1
Other Christians	11,806	6.7
Islam	3,311	1.9
Hindu	3,367	1.9
Total	177,190	100.0

== Services ==
=== Libraries ===
The Municipal Council runs 8 public libraries:

1. Janasetha Library, Katubedda
2. Moratuwa Public Library
3. Soysapura Branch Library
4. Galpotta Branch Library
5. Thelawala Branch Library
6. Egoda Uyana Branch Library
7. Katukurunda Branch Library
8. Koralawella Branch Library
