= Badulla Municipal Council =

Local council for Badulla

Badulla Municipal Council බදුල්ල මහ නගර සභාව
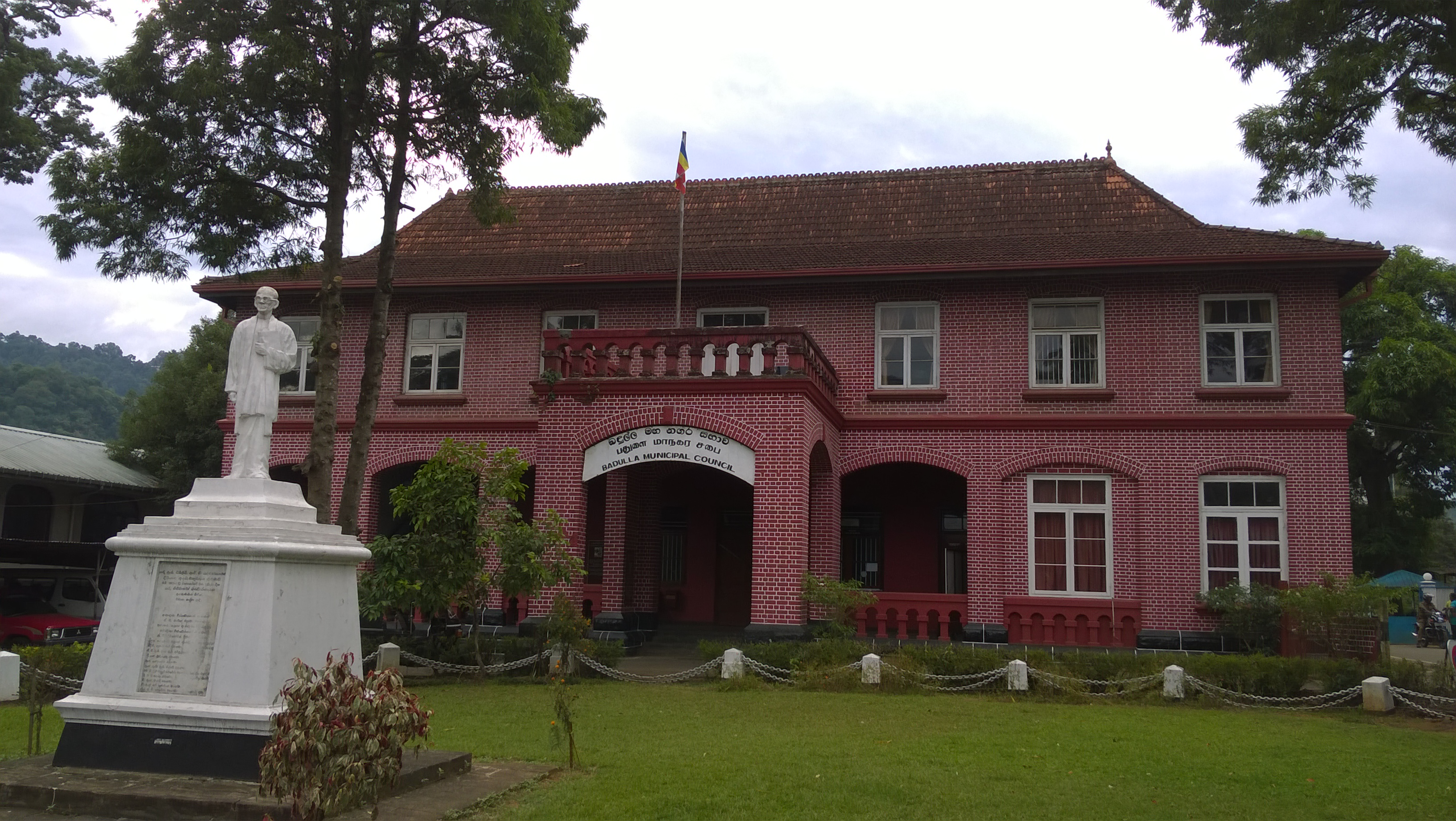

Type
- Type: Local authority

Leadership
- Mayor: Priyantha Amarasiri since 8 February 2018 (UNP) U. N. Gunasekara, (UPFA) 8 October 2011 to 7 February 2018

Structure
- Seats: 27
- Political groups: Government (15): NPP (15); Opposition (12): SJB (6); PA (3); SLPP (2); UNP (1)

Elections
- Voting system: Open list proportional representation system
- Last election: 9 May 2025
- Next election: TBD

The Badulla Municipal Council is the local council for Badulla, the capital city of Uva Province. The council was first formed as a Town Council which was established in the 1933 and was upgraded to Municipal Council status in 1963. Badulla Municipal Council is considered one of the oldest Municipal Councils in the Sri Lanka.

== Representation ==
The Badulla Municipal Council is divided into 13 wards and is represented by 15 councillors, elected using an open list proportional representation system. Wards those belong to the Badulla Municipal Council are listed below.

1. Medapathana
2. Kailagoda
3. Badulla North
4. Pitawelagama
5. Badulla West
6. Katupelella
7. Badulla Central
8. Badulupitiya
9. Badulla East
10. Hindagoda
11. Badulla South
12. Hingurugamuwa
13. Kanupelella

=== 2011 Local government election ===
Results of the local government election held on 8 October 2011.

Alliances and parties	Votes	%	Seats
United People's Freedom Alliance (NC, ACMC, SLFP et al.)	13,337	63.25%	10
United National Party	6,982	33.11%	5
Janatha Vimukthi Peramuna	453	2.15%	0
Up-Country People's Front	293	1.39%	0
Eksath Lanka Maha Sabha	7	0.03%	0
Patriotic National Front	4	0.02%	0
Independent Group 1	4	0.02%	0
Independent Group 2	4	0.02%	0
Jana Setha Peramuna	2	0.01%	0
Ruhunu Janatha Party	0	0.0%	0
Valid Votes	21,086	97.38%	15
Rejected Votes	567		
Total Polled	21,653		
Registered Electors	29,312		
Turnout	73.87		
