= Gampaha Municipal Council =

Gampaha Municipal Council: ගම්පහ මහ නගර සභාව (Sinhala); கம்பாஹா மாநகர சபை (Tamil)

Type
- Type: Local authority

History
- Founded: April 15, 2002; 24 years ago
- Preceded by: Gampaha Urban Council (1945 - 2002)

Leadership
- Mayor: Eric Lakshman Ediriwickrama, NPP since 2025
- Deputy Mayor: Ramal Indrawansha Siriwardhana, NPP since 2025
- Municipal Commissioner: A. D. P. I. Prasanna

Structure
- Seats: 28
- Political groups: Government (17): NPP (17); Opposition (11): SJB (4); SLPP (4); PA (2); UNP (1)

Elections
- Voting system: Mixed: 60% First-past-the-post; 40% closed list proportional representation
- Last election: 2025

Meeting place
- Gampaha Municipal Council Office, Gampaha

Website
- http://gampaha.mc.gov.lk

The Gampaha Municipal Council (Sinhala: ගම්පහ මහ නගර සභාව, Tamil: கம்பாஹா மாநகர சபை) is the primary administrative body of the Gampaha District of Sri Lanka. It has 28 members elected under the mixed electoral system where 60% of members will be elected using first-past-the-post voting and the remaining 40% through closed list proportional representation.

== History ==
The Urban Council of Gampaha has a history that stretches back to 1945. Two Gazette notifications (No. 1142/22 of August 2000, and No. 117/7 of March 2001) established the Gampaha Municipal Council, which held its first meeting on 15 April 2002.

== Structure ==
Currently there are 28 seats in the council.

Political party	Council members							
Political party	1991	1997	2002	2006	2011	2018	2025	
NPP (Note: As JVP in 1991, 1997, 2002, 2006, 2011 and 2018)	–	–	2	4	–	3	17	17 / 28
SJB	–	–	–	–	–	–	4	4 / 28
SLPP	–	–	–	–	–	17	4	4 / 28
PA (Note: As SLFP in 1991 and UPFA in 2006, 2011 and 2018.)	3	6	6	–	14	3	2	2 / 28
UNP	6	3	10	9	3	6	1	1 / 28
Ind	–	–	–	–	1	1	–	0 / 28
Liberal	–	–	–	4	–	–	–	0 / 28
JHU	–	–	–	1	–	–	–	0 / 28
Total	9	9	18	18	18	30	28	

== Demographics ==
Gampaha Municipal Council consists of 33 Grama Niladhari divisions, with a combined population of 62,797:

Population by Grama Niladhari division (2014)
Division Name	Number	Population
Pahalagama	222	1446
Madagama 1	223	228
Madagama 2	223/A	3119
Madagama 3	223/B	1322
Madagama 4	223/C	1808
Ihalagama West	224	1960
Ihalagama East	224/A	2013
Gampaha Aluthgama West	225	2342
Gampaha Aluthgama North	225/A	1965
Gampaha Aluthgama East	225/B	3690
Idigolla	225/C	1657
Baduvatugoḍa	226	1156
Karanayakamulla	226/A	748
Keselwatugoda North	227	2883
Keselwatugoda South	227/A	1155
Boraliyawatha	228	1049
Tiththalapithigoda	228/A	1174
Aluthgama Bogamuwa North	229	3897
Aluthgama Bogamuwa South	229/A	1918
Mahipalagoda	230	1582
Moranna	230/A	1280
Vidiyawatta	230/B	1391
Galthotamulla	230/C	1225
Yakkala North	231	3487
Yakkala West	231/A	2176
Papolgahadeniya	231/B	2118
Yakkala South	231/C	1880
Yakkala East	231/D	1275
Henarathgoda	232	2978
Bandiyamulla North	234	1290
Bandiyamulla East	234/A	1864
Bandiyamulla West	234/B	2712
Kidagammulla	234/C	2009
Total		62797

=== Ethnic groups ===
Population by Ethnicity (2014)
1. Sinhalese (98.9%)
2. Sri Lankan Tamils (0.48%)
3. Burghers (0.22%)
4. Sri Lankan Moors (0.18%)
5. Indian Tamils (0.10%)
6. Other (0.12%)

Population by Ethnicity (2014)
Ethnicity	Population	% Of Total
Sinhalese	62,108	98.90
Sri Lankan Tamils	301	0.48
Indian Tamils	67	0.10
Sri Lankan Moors	115	0.18
Burgher	138	0.22
Sri Lankan Malays	38	0.06
Sri Lankan Chetties	5	0.00
Other	25	0.03
Total	62,797	100.00
