= Matara Municipal Council =

Type
- Type: Local authority

Leadership
- Mayor: Jayantha Kumarasiri Serasinghe Pathiranage (NPP)
- Deputy Mayor: Nishantha Wickramarathna (NPP)

Structure
- Seats: 30
- Political groups: Government (17): National People's Power (17); Opposition (13): Samagi Jana Balawegaya (4); Independent Group (3); Sri Lanka Podujana Peramuna (2); Communist Party of Sri Lanka (2); United National Party (1); People's Alliance (1)

Elections
- Voting system: open list proportional representation system
- Last election: 6 May 2025

The Matara Municipal Council is the local council for Matara, the second largest city in the Southern Province of Sri Lanka, the third level administrative division of the country. The council was established under the Municipalities Ordinance of 1865 as the 13th municipal council of Sri Lanka.

== Geography ==
The Matara Four Gravets is 21.2 km^{2} (8.2 sq mi) in area. The average elevation above sea level is 16 m (52 ft).

== Administrative units ==
Matara Municipal Council is divided into 36 Grama Niladhari Divisions (GN Divisions), with seven villages.

== Population ==
The population of Matara Four Gravets area, according to the 2011 Census, was 114,970, a decline from the population of 103,246 in 2001.

Ethnicity in Matara (2011)
Population	Percent
Sinhalese	95.87%
Muslims	3.75%
Tamils	0.28%
Others	0.09%

Ethnicity	Population	% Of Total
Sinhalese	67,470	95.87
Sri Lankan Moors	4,314	3.75
Sri Lankan Tamils	304	0.26
Indian Tamils	22	0.02
Other (including Burgher, Malay)	140	0.09
Total	114,970	100

== Mayor ==
The Mayor of Matara is the head of Matara Municipal Council and his office is located at the Matara Town Hall. Mayor Sosindra Handunge resigned on 20 September 2015 from his position and the current acting mayor is Ranjith Yasaratna.

== Representation ==
The Matara Municipal Council is divided into 30 wards and is represented by 30 councillors, elected using an open list proportional representation system.

=== 2018 local government election ===
Results of the local government election held on 8 February 2018:

Alliances and parties	Votes	%	Seats
Sri Lanka Podujana Peramuna	20,655	45.72%	15
United National Party	13,446	29.76%	8
United People's Freedom Alliance (NC, SLFP et al.)	5,668	12.55%	4
Janatha Vimukthi Peramuna	5,233	11.58%	3
National People's Party	179	0.4%	0
Valid Votes	45,181	100.00%	30
Rejected Votes	720		
Total Polled	45,901		
Registered Electors	56,455		
Turnout			

=== 2011 local government election ===
Results of the local government election held on 8 October 2011:

Alliances and parties	Votes	%	Seats
United People's Freedom Alliance (NC, ACMC, SLFP et al.)	20,681	57.68%	9
United National Party	12,619	35.20%	5
Peoples Liberation Front	1,449	4.04%	1
Independent 1	1,056	2.95%	0
Our National Front	18	0.05%	0
Jana Setha Peramuna	10	0.03%	0
People's Liberation Solidarity Front	8	0.02%	0
Ruhuna People's Party (Ruhunu Janatha Party)	8	0.02%	0
Independent 2	5	0.01%	0
Valid Votes	35,854	97.82%	15
Rejected Votes	798		
Total Polled	36,652		
Registered Electors	51,895		
Turnout	70.63%		

Preference votes (2011) results as below:

Sosindra Handunge UPFA: topping the list with – 8,389 votes followed by UPFA candidates K.D.G Yasarathna – 7,206 and Chathura Galappaththi with 6,356 and UNP list : Upul Nishantha – 7,486 votes followed by Nandasena Sellaheva – 3,035 preference votes respectively.

The Matara Municipal Council has five standing committees each headed by committee chairman. The standing committees are Finance and Tender, Works and Solid Waste, Health and Sanitisation, Electricity and Water, and Environment.
