= Kurunegala Municipal Council =

Sri Lankan government building

Kurunegala Municipal Council කුරුණෑගල මහ නගර සභාව

Type
- Type: Local authority

Leadership
- Mayor: Ananda Sahabandu – Attorney at Law, Jathika Jana Balawegaya|(NPP) since 06 May 2025
- Deputy Mayor: M. Ashardeen Moinudeen, All Ceylon Makkal Congress (ACMC) since 06 May 2025
- Seats: 22

Elections
- Voting system: Open list proportional representation
- Last election: 6 May 2025
- Next election: TBD

Meeting place
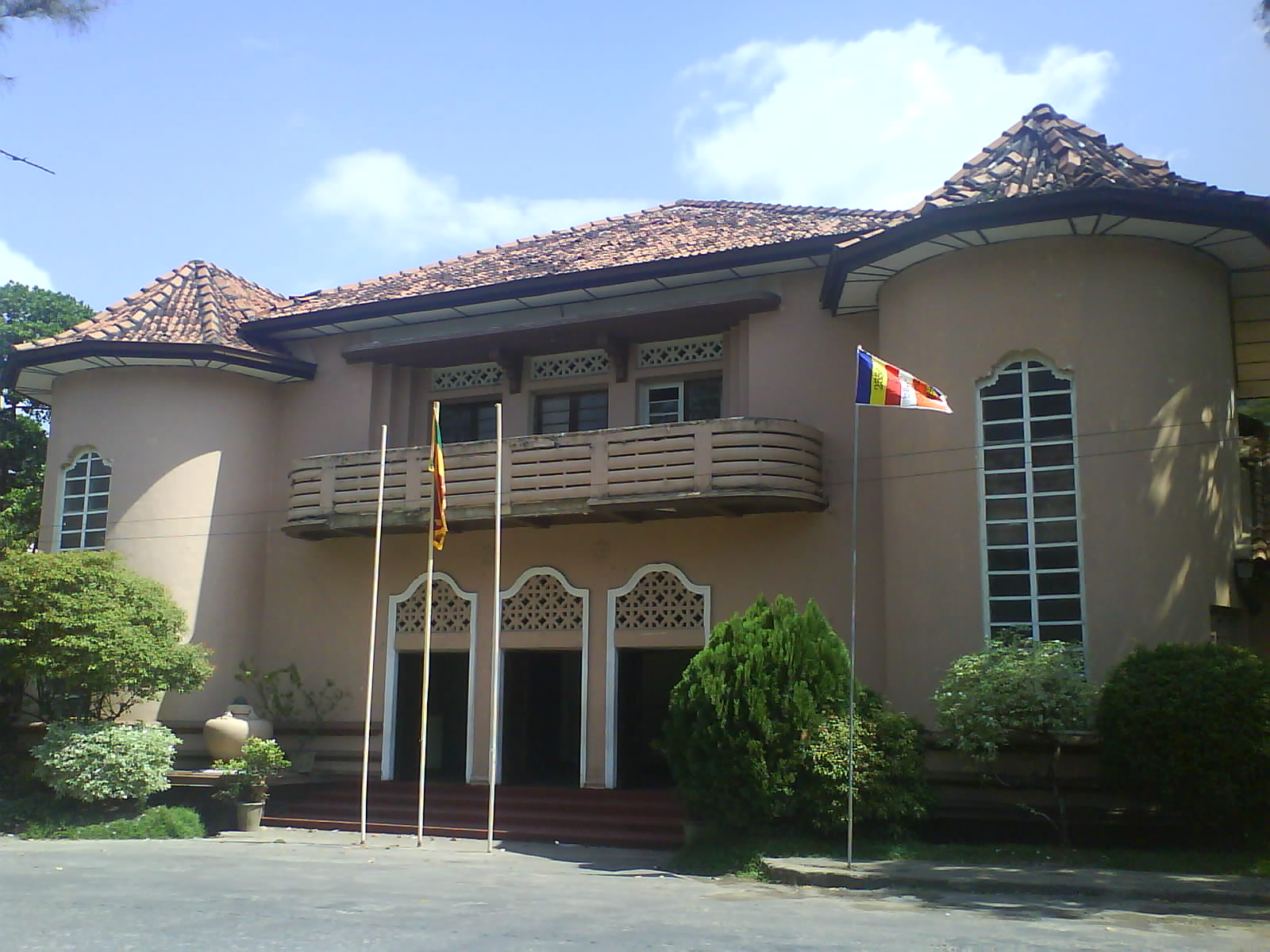
- Town Hall Kurunegala

The Kurunegala Municipal Council (Sinhala: කුරුණෑගල මහ නගර සභා Kurunegala Maha Nagara Sabha) is the local council for Kurunegala, the capital city of North Western Province, Sri Lanka. The Municipal Council provides sewer, road management, and waste management services, in the case of water, electricity, and telephone utility services the council liaises with the Water Supply and Drainage Board, the Ceylon Electricity Board and telephone service providers.

== Representation ==
The Kurunegala Municipal Council is divided into 13 wards and is represented by 22 councilors, elected using an open list proportional representation system. Wards that belong to the Kurunegala Municipal Council are listed below.

1. Gangoda
2. Wewa
3. Central
4. Yanthampalawa
5. Illuppugedara
6. Madamegama
7. Wehera
8. Udawalpola
9. Bazzar
10. Gettuwana
11. Polaththapitiya
12. Teliyagonna (Upper)
13. Teliyagonna (Lower)

=== 2025 Local government election ===
Results of the local government election held on 06 May 2025.

Alliances and parties	Votes	%	Seats
Jathika Jana Balawegaya	5,721	41.09%	10
Samagi Jana Balawegaya	3,426	24.60%	5
Sri Lanka Mahajana Pakshaya	1,117	8.02%	2
All Ceylon Makkal Congress	417	2.99%	1
United National Alliance	558	4.01%	1
United National Party	508	3.65%	1
People's Alliance	402	2.89%	1
Sri Lanka Podujana Peramuna	729	5.24%	1
Members			22
Electors	21,621		
Valid Votes	13,924		
Rejected Votes	248		
Total Polled	14,172		
