= Haputale Urban Council =

Sri Lankan local authority

Type
- Type: Local authority

Leadership
- Chairman: Upul Dissanayake, United People's Freedom Alliance since February 2025
- Deputy Chairman: Kandasami Shivakumar since February 2018
- Seats: 11

Elections
- Voting system: open list proportional representation system
- Last election: 2018 Sri Lankan local government elections

Website
- http://haputale.uc.gov.lk

Haputale Urban Council (HUC) is the local authority for the town of Haputale in the Badulla District, Uva Province, Sri Lanka. The HUC is responsible for providing a variety of local public services including roads, sanitation, drains, housing, libraries, public parks and recreational facilities. It has 11 councillors elected using an open list proportional representation system.

== Election results ==
=== 2006 local government election ===
Results of the local government election held on 20 May 2006:

Alliances and parties	Votes	%	Seats
United People's Freedom Alliance (NC, ACMC, SLFP et al.)	1,527	76.70%	7
United National Party	441	22.15%	2
People's Liberation Front	22	1.10%	0
Up-Country People's Front	1	0.05%	0
Valid Votes	1,991	100.00%	9
Rejected Votes	57		
Total Polled	2,048		
Registered Electors	2,603		
Turnout	78.68%		

=== 2011 local government election ===
Results of the local government election held on 17 March 2011:

Alliances and parties	Votes	%	Seats
United People's Freedom Alliance (NC, ACMC, SLFP et al.)	1,205	61.54%	6
United National Party	703	35.9%	3
Up-Country People's Front	48	2.5%	0
People's Liberation Front	2	0.1%	0
Valid Votes	1,958	100.00%	9
Rejected Votes	59		
Total Polled	2,017		
Registered Electors	2,506		
Turnout	80.49%		

=== 2018 local government election ===
Results of the local government election held on 10 February 2018:

Alliances and parties	Votes	%	Seats
United People's Freedom Alliance (NC, ACMC, SLFP et al.)	1,610	67.25%	8
United National Party	666	27.82%	3
People's Liberation Front	59	2.46%	0
Sri Lanka Podujana Peramuna	59	2.46%	0
Valid Votes	2,394	100.00%	11
Rejected Votes	61		
Total Polled	2,455		
Registered Electors	2,881		
Turnout	85.21%		
