= United Republican Front =

Political party in Sri Lanka

- Leader: Patali Champika Ranawaka
- Founded: 22 May 2023 (2 years ago)
- Split from: Jathika Hela Urumaya
- National affiliation: Samagi Jana Balawegaya
- Colors: Teal
- Local Government: 7 / 8,741

Election symbol
- Pencil

The United Republican Front is political party in Sri Lanka founded and led by former minister and MP Patali Champika Ranawaka.

The party supported SJB candidate Sajith Premadasa in the 2024 presidential elections.
