= Kalmunai Municipal Council =

Local authority in Sri Lanka

Type
- Type: Local Authority

Leadership
- Mayor: TBA
- Deputy Mayor: TBA
- Municipal Commissioner: TBA
- Seats: 41

Elections
- Voting system: Mixed Seystem (Ward & PR)
- Last election: 2018 Sri Lankan local government elections
- Next election: TBA

Kalmunai Municipal Council (KMC) is the local authority for the city of Kalmunai in south-eastern Sri Lanka. KMC is responsible for providing a variety of local public services including roads, sanitation, drains, housing, libraries, public parks and recreational facilities. It has 41 members elected using the Mixed system.

== History ==
Kalmunai Pradeshiya Sabha was created in 1987 as part of the nationwide local government re-organisation. Kalmunai didn't have an elected local government for sporadic periods, this was due to various reasons. Aljazeera, the Asiafoundation and the Daily Mirror attribute this to civil war; Reuters and the US State Department attribute this to calls for election boycotts by the LTTE (enforced with brutal reprisals for non compliance); the Taipei Times and the BBC attribute this to area coming under LTTE control and the Tamilnet attribute it to The Sri Lankan government's suspension of all local government in the north and east of the country in 1983 using Emergency Regulations. Kalmunai was promoted to municipality in 2001.

== Election results ==
Local Authorities Election 2018 Results - Sri Lanka | Adaderana]

=== 2018 local government election ===
Results of the local government election held on 10 February 2018:

Alliances and parties	Votes	%	Seats
United National Party	17,424	29.66%	12
Independent Group 4	13,239	22.54%	9
Ilankai Tamil Arasu Kadchi	9,003	15.33%	7
All Ceylon Makkal Congress (ACMC)	7,573	12.89%	5
Tamil United Liberation Front (TULF)	4,749	8.08%	3
Independent Group 3	1,572	2.68%	1
National Congress	1,522	2.59%	1
Independent Group 2	1,226	2.09%	1
Sri Lanka Freedom Party	1,130	1.92%	1
National Front for Good Governance	623	1.06%	1
Valid Votes	58,744	100.00%	41
Rejected Votes	611		
Total Polled	59,355		
Registered Electors	74,946		
Turnout	77.46%		

Source: elections.gov.lk

Elected Ward Members: S.Kuberan (ITAK Ward No.01), AM.Rakeeb (UNP -02), AR.Ameer (UNP -03), MS.Umar Ali (UNP -04), MSM.Harees (Indp.03 -05), A.Vijayaratnam (ITAK -06), CM.Mufeeth (ACMC -07), K.Selvarasa (TULF -08), T.Rasaratnam (ITAK -09), P.Selvanayakam (ITAK -10), K.Mahenthiran (ITAK -11), S.Santhirasegaram (ITAK -12), K.Sivalingam (ITAK -13), ACA.Sathar (UNP -14), AMA.Rozan (UNP -15), M.Rahmath (UNP -16), AM.Fairoos (UNP -17), NM.Rismeer (Indp.04 -18), M.Fasmeer (Indp.04 -19), MYM.Joufar (Indp.04 -20), ARM.Aseem (Indp.04 -21), MSA.Rafeek (Indp.04 -22), MIA.Azees (Indp.04 -23)

Nominate Members: M. Nanthini (UNP), K. Puwaneswary (UNP), Arika Kariyaper (UNP), AMS. Nasreen (UNP), MA. Siddeeka (Indp.04), AH. Suyail (Indp.04), ANS. Rameesa (Indp.04), MIMA. Manaf (ACMC), AR. Baseera (ACMC), US. Sameena (ACMC), V. Santhiran (TULF), K. Vijayalaksumi (TULF), AR. Selesthina (Indp.02), AL. Rafeek (SLFP), NAM. Azam (NFGG), MMM. Safras (NC), BM. Sifan (ACMC)

- AM. Rakeeb (UNP) elected as Mayor (Voting 22/41 seats)

Sources: www.dailymirror.lk and www.metromirror.lk

List of mayors

- A.R. Azmeer (2006-2007)
- H.M.M. Harees (2008-2009)
- S.Z.M. Mashoor Moulana (2009-2011)
- Siraz Meerasahib (2011-2013)
- Nizam Kariapper (2013-2016)
- A.M. Rakeeb (2018-now)
