= Kalmunai =

Kalmunai கல்முனை කල්මුනේ
- City
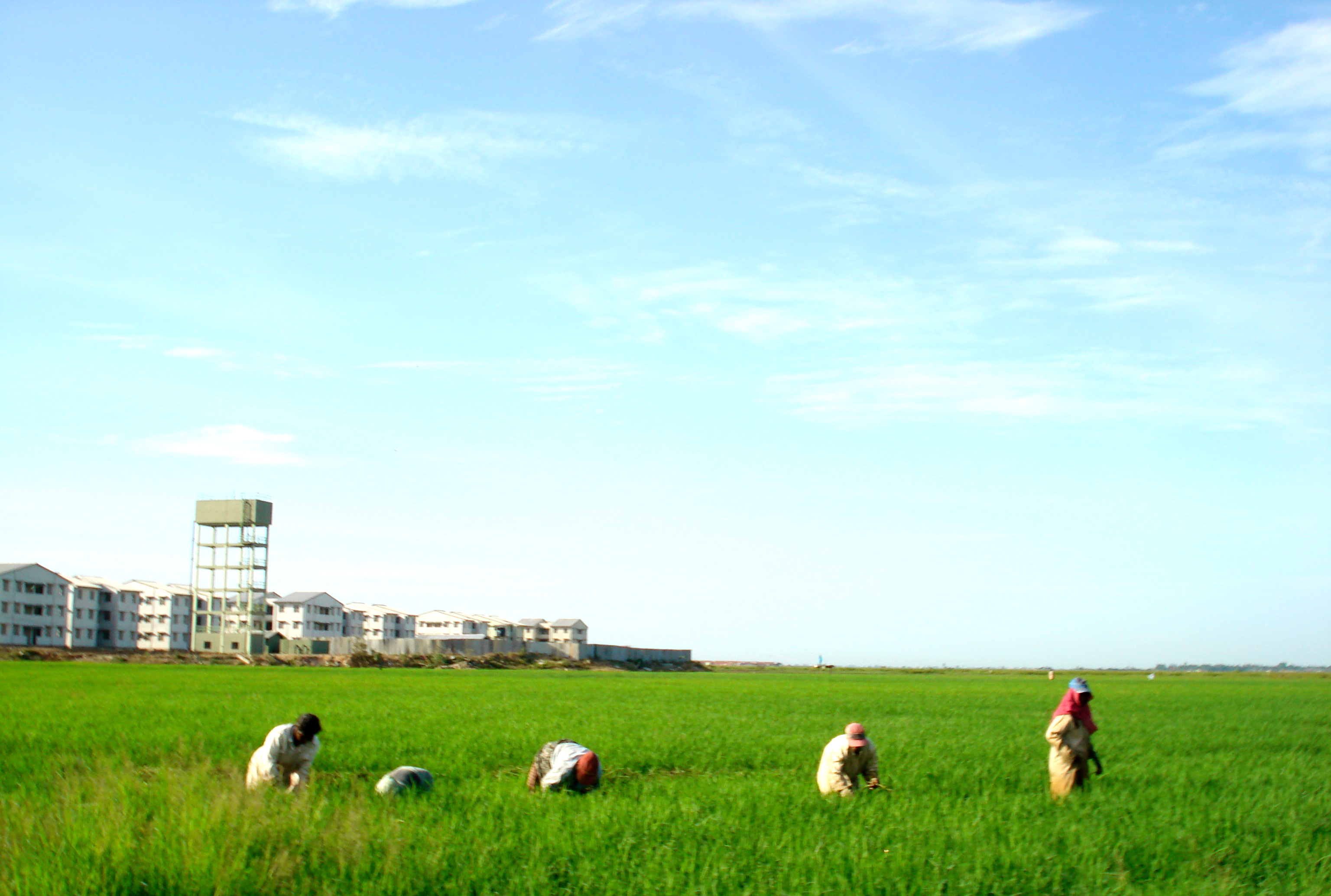
- Farmers working in a paddy field in kalmunai west

- Location within Sri Lanka
- Coordinates: 7°25′00″N 81°49′00″E
- Country: Sri Lanka
- Province: Eastern
- District: Ampara
- DS Division: Kalmunai

Government
  - Type: Municipal Council
  - Electoral District: Ampara
  - Electoral District: Kalmunai

Area
  - Total: 30 km^{2} (12 sq mi)

Population (2011)
  - Total: 106,780
  - Density: 4,726/km^{2} (12,240/sq mi)
- Time zone: UTC+5:30 (Sri Lanka Standard Time Zone)
- Postal code: 32300
- Website: https://www.kalmunai.mc.gov.lk/

Kalmunai (Tamil: கல்முனை, romanized: Kalmuṉai; Sinhala: කල්මුනේ, romanized: Kalmunē) is a city located in the Ampara District of Eastern Province, Sri Lanka.

== Etymology ==
The name "Kalmunai" is believed to have originated from the Tamil words "Kal" and "Munai," which respectively mean "stone" and "corner." This name refers to the geographical location of the city, as it is situated at a corner where the land meets the sea. Kalmunai's strategic position along the eastern coast of Sri Lanka has played a significant role in shaping its history and culture.

== History ==
Kalmunai has a historical background that dates back centuries. The region has been influenced by various civilisations, including the ancient Tamil kingdoms, colonial powers, and the indigenous Muslim community. Over time, Kalmunai became an important trading post due to its coastal location, facilitating maritime trade routes with other countries.

During the Sri Lankan civil war, Kalmunai experienced the devastating effects of the conflict. The city faced numerous challenges, including forced disappearances, civil unrest, and violence targeted at local civilians.

In 2004, Kalmunai was severely impacted by the Indian Ocean tsunami. The natural disaster resulted in the loss of many lives and caused extensive damage to the city's infrastructure and property.

== Geography ==
Kalmunai is situated on the eastern coast of Sri Lanka, bordered by the Indian Ocean to the east.

Kalmunai MC covers an area of 2,740.08 ha (6,770.9 acres). To the north of Kalmunai lies the village of Periyaneelavanai, which serves as the border between Ampara and Batticaloa Districts. To the south, the city is connected to the suburb of Karaitivu. Kalmunai's geographical features, including its proximity to the ocean and neighboring villages, have shaped its identity and provided opportunities for economic growth.

== Demographics ==
- Population - 99,893 [2012] – final census result
- Population Density - 4,343/km^{2} [2012]
- Annual Population Change - 0.51% [2001 → 2012]

Kalmunai is known for its diverse population, with a significant majority being Muslims. The city is one of the few municipalities in Sri Lanka where Muslims constitute the majority.

== Administration ==
The main divisions of Kalmunai include:

- Kalmunai Central: This division encompasses Kalmunai Town, Kalmunai Kudy, Natpaddimunai, and Chenaikudiruppu. Kalmunai Town serves as the primary commercial and administrative center of the city, catering to various needs of the residents.
- Sainthamaruthu: Located in the southern part of Kalmunai, Sainthamaruthu is a prominent residential area with its own distinct community and cultural activities. It has its separate division to ensure effective governance and administration.
- Pandiruppu: Situated in the eastern part of the city, Pandiruppu functions as a separate administrative division within Kalmunai.
- Maruthamunai: Maruthamunai is a neighborhood in Kalmunai, offering a range of amenities and services to its residents. It is part of the larger administrative framework of the city.
- Natpiddimunai: Natpiddimunai is the closest hamlet to the Kalmunai town, acting as an important access to the western regions of the Ampara district through the popular causeway named, "Kittanky". The village connects Kalmunai mainland to the Colony regions of Ampara and Batticaloa districts. It is sometimes called "Karaivahu West" for administrative purposes and has a sub-office for the Kalmunai Municipality. Natpiddimunai boasts of a strategic location, sandwiched in between the Pattippalai Aru in the south and the vast Mettuvaddai plains stretching to regions of Batticaloa district to the north.
- Periyaneelavanai: This village is located to the north of Kalmunai and acts as a border between Ampara and Batticaloa Districts.

In addition to these divisions based on geographical locations, Kalmunai also has administrative divisions that cater to specific communities:

- Kalmunai Muslim Division: This division, primarily centered around Kalmunai Central, is dedicated to serving the Muslim community residing in the city. It focuses on addressing the specific needs and concerns of the Muslim population.
- Kalmunai Tamil Division: The Tamil Division is responsible for governing the northern part of Kalmunai, primarily inhabited by Tamil Hindus. It ensures the provision of services and facilities tailored to the requirements of the Tamil-speaking population.
- Sainthamaruthu Division: As a separate division within Kalmunai, Sainthamaruthu is dedicated to addressing the administrative needs of the residents in the southern part of the city, emphasizing the unique characteristics and requirements of the area.

== Economy ==
Kalmunai serves as a major economic hub in the Eastern Province of Sri Lanka, with key sectors including trade, agriculture, fishing, manufacturing, and services. Kalmunai's coastal location has facilitated international trade, attracting investments and contributing to the city's economic growth.

The commercial centre of Kalmunai is home to a marketplace where a wide range of goods and services are traded. The city's agricultural sector primarily focuses on rice cultivation, horticulture, and fishing, utilizing the fertile land and coastal resources. Kalmunai also hosts various industries, including garment manufacturing, food processing, and construction.

The city's administration collaborates with the central government to implement development projects, improve infrastructure, and address the needs of the local population.

== Education ==
The city is home to numerous schools, both public and private, providing education from primary to secondary levels. Kalmunai has several national schools as well as Carmel Fatima College and Zahira college.

Higher education options are also available in Kalmunai, with private colleges offering undergraduate and postgraduate programs in various fields.

== See also ==
- An Historical Relation of the Island Ceylon
