= Results of the 2011 Sri Lankan local government elections by province, district and local authority =

Results of the 2011 Sri Lankan local government elections by province, district and local authority.

== Province ==
Province	UPFA/ NC Votes	UPFA/ NC Seats	UNP Votes	UNP Seats	TNA/ TULF Votes	TNA/ TULF Seats	JVP Votes	JVP Seats	Ind Votes	Ind Seats	SLMC Votes	SLMC Seats	Others Votes	Others Seats	Total Valid Votes	Total Seats	Rejected Votes	Total Polled	Registered Electors	Turnout %
Central	559,038	354	409,546	213			18,435	4	39,650	23	19,324	10	66,667	29	1,112,660	633	64,061	1,176,721	1,800,132	65.37%
Eastern	226,217	180	83,334	56	64,453	49	5,491	2	28,706	10	79,797	46	5,422	3	493,420	346	17,808	511,228	735,066	69.55%
Northern	91,559	103	7,551	5	190,625	226	420	0	2,024	1	9,540	7	903	2	302,622	344	25,834	328,456	623,271	52.70%
North Central	397,460	219	146,457	63			18,243	5	10,192	3	3,597	1	8,417	3	584,366	294	27,873	612,239	877,144	69.80%
North Western	630,245	330	351,763	150			23,111	7	22,032	9	6,443	3	4,871	2	1,038,465	501	45,233	1,083,698	1,696,221	63.89%
Sabaragamuwa	549,168	294	285,947	124			16,840	2	16,554	4	512	0	764	0	869,785	424	44,920	914,705	1,369,585	66.79%
Southern	709,640	390	380,472	165			63,928	24	23,288	5	1,256	0	3,462	1	1,182,046	585	49,494	1,231,540	1,792,299	68.71%
Uva	311,688	201	204,576	100			15,864	4	9,454	3	3,072	1	13,212	7	557,866	316	33,671	591,537	891,618	66.34%
Western	1,346,188	540	840,576	281			80,170	26	68,098	19	17,186	4	47,644	14	2,399,862	884	96,385	2,496,247	3,868,188	64.53%
Total	4,821,203	2,611	2,710,222	1,157	255,078	275	242,502	74	219,998	77	140,727	72	151,362	61	8,541,092	4,327	405,279	8,946,371	13,653,524	65.52%

== District ==
District	Prov	UPFA/ NC Votes	UPFA/ NC Seats	UNP Votes	UNP Seats	TNA/ TULF Votes	TNA/ TULF Seats	JVP Votes	JVP Seats	Ind Votes	Ind Seats	SLMC Votes	SLMC Seats	Others Votes	Others Seats	Total Valid Votes	Total Seats	Rejected Votes	Total Polled	Registered Electors	Turnout %
Ampara	EA	119,881	91	50,747	36	30,108	25	2,878	1	11,322	4	73,949	42	3,301	2	292,186	201	9,854	302,040	428,290	70.52%
Anuradhapura	NC	261,765	150	102,294	44			12,863	3	8,276	3	2,241	0	7,669	3	395,108	203	18,204	413,312	590,639	69.98%
Badulla	UV	189,517	126	143,684	74			10,463	3	5,610	1	2,907	1	12,577	7	364,758	212	22,591	387,349	581,929	66.56%
Batticaloa	EA	25,766	19	1,918	1	329	0	61	0	9,440	3	5,848	4	491	0	43,853	27	1,125	44,978	60,861	73.90%
Colombo	WE	478,884	169	306,505	96			33,698	9	34,087	8	10,544	2	38,579	11	902,297	295	37,098	939,395	1,537,451	61.10%
Galle	SO	310,069	161	171,500	71			19,794	8	14,734	3	903	0	3,335	1	520,335	244	22,106	542,441	775,041	69.99%
Gampaha	WE	558,153	226	344,586	112			28,714	11	9,468	3	1,636	1	3,082	1	945,639	354	36,109	981,748	1,503,334	65.30%
Hambantota	SO	167,540	93	90,120	38			26,998	10	928	0			38	0	285,624	141	11,749	297,373	430,997	69.00%
Jaffna	NO	47,067	57	3,756	2	124,967	142	33	0	431	0					176,254	201	16,402	192,656	374,343	51.47%
Kalutara	WE	309,151	145	189,485	73			17,758	6	24,543	8	5,006	1	5,983	2	551,926	235	23,178	575,104	827,403	69.51%
Kandy	CE	329,870	193	234,896	124			11,592	3	12,954	6	18,168	9	5,878	3	613,358	338	31,076	644,434	984,976	65.43%
Kegalle	SA	249,270	135	132,205	59			8,246	1	1,736	0			71	0	391,528	195	20,754	412,282	621,908	66.29%
Kilinochchi	NO	10,970	11	247	0	24,086	27	43	0			154	0			35,500	38	4,328	39,828	61,217	65.06%
Kurunegala	NW	437,822	215	269,377	112			20,118	7	9,881	3	3,844	1	4,686	2	745,728	340	32,307	778,035	1,193,552	65.19%
Mannar	NO	18,974	17	393	0	20,433	24	29	0	254	0	7,444	5			47,527	46	1,829	49,356	88,916	55.51%
Matale	CE	121,895	95	81,194	47			3,702	0	16,928	12	969	1	505	0	225,193	155	12,444	237,637	347,722	68.34%
Matara	SO	232,031	136	118,852	56			17,136	6	7,626	2	353	0	89	0	376,087	200	15,639	391,726	586,261	66.82%
Moneragala	UV	122,171	75	60,892	26			5,401	1	3,844	2	165	0	635	0	193,108	104	11,080	204,188	309,689	65.93%
Mullaitivu	NO	920	3	24	0	3,421	13							903	2	5,268	18	481	5,749	10,805	53.21%
Nuwara Eliya	CE	107,273	66	93,456	42			3,141	1	9,768	5	187	0	60,284	26	274,109	140	20,541	294,650	467,434	63.04%
Polonnaruwa	NC	135,695	69	44,163	19			5,380	2	1,916	0	1,356	1	748	0	189,258	91	9,669	198,927	286,505	69.43%
Puttalam	NW	192,423	115	82,386	38			2,993	0	12,151	6	2,599	2	185	0	292,737	161	12,926	305,663	502,669	60.81%
Ratnapura	SA	299,898	159	153,742	65			8,594	1	14,818	4	512	0	693	0	478,257	229	24,166	502,423	747,677	67.20%
Trincomalee	EA	80,570	70	30,669	19	34,016	24	2,552	1	7,944	3			1,630	1	157,381	118	6,829	164,210	245,915	66.78%
Vavuniya	NO	13,628	15	3,131	3	17,718	20	315	0	1,339	1	1,942	2			38,073	41	2,794	40,867	87,990	46.45%
Total		4,821,203	2,611	2,710,222	1,157	255,078	275	242,502	74	219,998	77	140,727	72	151,362	61	8,541,092	4,327	405,279	8,946,371	13,653,524	65.52%

== Local authority ==
No.	Local Authority	Type	Dist	Prov	Date of Election	UPFA/ NC Votes	UPFA/ NC Seats	UNP Votes	UNP Seats	TNA/ TULF Votes	TNA/ TULF Seats	JVP Votes	JVP Seats	Ind Votes	Ind Seats	SLMC Votes	SLMC Seats	Others Votes	Others Seats	Total Valid Votes	Total Seats	Rejected Votes	Total Polled	Registered Electors	Turnout %	Winner
1	Akkaraipattu	MC	AMP	EA	2011-03-17	11,821	8	98	0					584	0	2,819	1			15,322	9	444	15,766	20,971	75.18%	NC (UPFA)
2	Anuradhapura	MC	ANU	NC	2011-10-08	14,849	10	5,028	3			853	0	586	0					21,316	13	743	22,059	32,976	66.89%	UPFA
3	Badulla	MC	BAD	UV	2011-10-08	13,337	10	6,982	5			453	0	8	0			297	0	21,077	15	567	21,644	29,312	73.84%	UPFA
4	Bandarawela	MC	BAD	UV	2011-03-17	5,618	3	5,772	6			155	0	7	0			19	0	11,571	9	324	11,895	16,673	71.34%	UNP
5	Batticalao	MC	BAT	EA																						
6	Colombo	MC	COL	WE	2011-10-08	77,089	16	101,920	24			3,162	1	10,309	2	9,979	2	34,133	8	236,592	53	10,270	246,862	393,085	62.80%	NOC (UNP)
7	Dambulla	MC	MTL	CE	2011-03-17	6,701	10	3,305	4			188	0	481	0					10,675	14	445	11,120	14,540	76.48%	UPFA
8	Dehiwala-Mount Lavinia	MC	COL	WE	2011-10-08	39,812	16	31,082	11			1,568	1	849	0			2,169	1	75,480	29	2,222	77,702	132,903	58.47%	UPFA
9	Galle	MC	GAL	SO	2011-10-08	23,539	11	16,137	7			1,085	1	123	0	903	0	677	0	42,464	19	1,179	43,643	64,720	67.43%	UPFA
10	Gampaha	MC	GAM	WE	2011-10-08	22,679	14	6,478	3			543	0	847	1			2	0	30,549	18	958	31,507	45,890	68.66%	UPFA
11	Hambantota	MC	HAM	SO	2011-10-08	6,183	8	4,742	4			126	0	2	0					11,053	12	245	11,298	14,616	77.30%	UPFA
12	Jaffna	MC	JAF	NO																						
13	Kaduwela	MC	COL	WE	2011-07-23	59,987	20	24,897	7			3,709	1	68	0			1,142	0	89,803	28	4,264	94,067	163,829	57.42%	UPFA
14	Kalmunai	MC	AMP	EA	2011-10-08	8,524	3	2,805	1	9,911	4	122	0	1,433	0	22,356	11	24	0	45,175	19	948	46,123	68,198	67.63%	SLMC
15	Kandy	MC	KAN	CE	2011-10-08	23,189	13	20,087	10			746	0	967	0	1,248	1	10	0	46,247	24	1,265	47,512	74,073	64.14%	UPFA
16	Kurunegala	MC	KUR	NW	2011-10-08	8,578	8	4,838	4			192	0	47	0					13,655	12	332	13,987	19,307	72.45%	UPFA
17	Matale	MC	MTL	CE	2011-10-08	11,407	9	4,751	3			180	0	736	1			505	0	17,579	13	620	18,199	26,587	68.45%	UPFA
18	Matara	MC	MTR	SO	2011-10-08	20,681	9	12,619	5			1,449	1	1,061	0					35,810	15	798	36,608	51,895	70.54%	UPFA
19	Moratuwa	MC	COL	WE	2011-10-08	45,286	18	25,224	9			1,585	1	4,718	1			3	0	76,816	29	1,923	78,739	113,795	69.19%	UPFA
20	Negombo	MC	GAM	WE	2011-10-08	37,232	16	24,712	9			396	0	27	0	1,588	1	1	0	63,956	26	2,077	66,033	100,283	65.85%	UPFA
21	Nuwara-Eliya	MC	NUW	CE	2011-10-08	6,275	6	5,781	3					182	0	187	0	1,237	1	13,662	10	532	14,194	18,472	76.84%	UPFA
22	Ratnapura	MC	RAT	SA	2011-10-08	15,626	11	6,820	4			186	0	572	0			58	0	23,262	15	572	23,834	32,677	72.94%	UPFA
23	Sri Jayawardenapura Kotte	MC	COL	WE	2011-10-08	26,723	13	10,830	5			942	0	2,242	1			1,297	1	42,034	20	1,319	43,353	73,486	58.99%	UPFA
24	Ambalangoda	UC	GAL	SO	2011-03-17	6,772	8	4,801	4			440	0					11	0	12,024	12	428	12,452	16,618	74.93%	UPFA
25	Ampara	UC	AMP	EA	2011-03-17	5,649	6	4,159	3			195	0	3	0					10,006	9	229	10,235	13,523	75.69%	UPFA
26	Balangoda	UC	RAT	SA	2011-03-17	5,427	6	4,035	3			146	0	4	0					9,612	9	302	9,914	13,733	72.19%	UPFA
27	Beruwala	UC	KAL	WE	2011-03-17	9,904	6	6,232	3			145	0	7	0			4	0	16,292	9	455	16,747	22,109	75.75%	UPFA
28	Boralesgamuwa	UC	COL	WE	2011-03-17	10,391	6	8,830	3			1,298	0	608	0			34	0	21,161	9	676	21,837	34,080	64.08%	UPFA
29	Chavakachcheri	UC	JAF	NO	2011-07-23	1,232	2	28	0	4,307	9							38	0	5,605	11	347	5,952	10,987	54.17%	TNA
30	Chilaw	UC	PUT	NW	2011-07-23	7,298	8	3,265	3			72	0	5	0					10,640	11	380	11,020	16,595	66.41%	UPFA
31	Embilipitiya	UC	RAT	SA	2011-07-23	9,497	5	6,274	2			577	0	18	0			5	0	16,371	7	596	16,967	26,119	64.96%	UPFA
32	Eravur	UC	BAT	EA	2011-03-17	6,593	6					11	0	2,080	1	3,453	2			12,137	9	313	12,450	16,522	75.35%	UPFA
33	Gampola	UC	KAN	CE	2011-03-17	7,812	6	8,537	9			164	0	1	0	486			0	17,000	15	696	17,696	26,822	65.98%	UNP
34	Haputale	UC	BAD	UV	2011-03-17	1,205	6	703	0			2	0					48	0	1,958	6	59	2,017	2,506	80.49%	UPFA
35	Hatton-Dickoya	UC	NUW	CE	2011-03-17	3,332	6	2,880	3			36	0					106	0	6,354	9	157	6,511	9,091	71.62%	UPFA
36	Hikkaduwa	UC	GAL	SO	2011-03-17	8,660	7	5,467	4			459	0	208	0			5	0	14,799	11	522	15,321	21,131	72.50%	UPFA
37	Horana	UC	KAL	WE	2011-03-17	2,760	6	2,698	3			161	0	5	0			3	0	5,627	9	183	5,810	7,723	75.23%	UPFA
38	Ja-Ela	UC	GAM	WE	2011-03-17	7,474	6	6,699	3			503	0	11	0			9	0	14,696	9	360	15,056	21,407	70.33%	UPFA
39	Kadugannawa	UC	KAN	CE	2011-03-17	2,772	4	3,519	7			97	0	22	0					6,410	11	220	6,630	9,259	71.61%	UNP
40	Kalutara	UC	KAL	WE	2011-03-17	5,822	4	8,571	7			652	0	358	0			15	0	15,418	11	539	15,957	23,308	68.46%	UNP
41	Kattankudy	UC	BAT	EA	2011-03-17	10,357	6	337	0			24	0	7,352	2	1,429	1			19,499	9	381	19,880	26,454	75.15%	UPFA
42	Katunayaka-Seeduwa	UC	GAM	WE	2011-03-17	10,610	6	6,358	3			368	0	119	0			11	0	17,466	9	496	17,962	24,621	72.95%	UPFA
43	Kegalle	UC	KEG	SA	2011-07-23	5,845	8	2,378	3			249	0	9	0					8,481	11	339	8,820	12,942	68.15%	UPFA
44	Kesbewa	UC	COL	WE	2011-07-23	38,112	10	29,652	6			2,926	1	183	0			46	0	70,919	17	2,596	73,515	119,460	61.54%	UPFA
45	Kinniya	UC	TRI	EA	2011-03-17	6,876	5	3,727	1	704	0	41	0	3,303	1			135	0	14,786	7	436	15,222	21,069	72.25%	UPFA
46	Kolonnawa	UC	COL	WE	2011-10-08	11,303	6	10,667	4			477	0	120	0	565	0	938	1	24,070	11	1,003	25,073	36,504	68.69%	UPFA
47	Kuliyapitiya	UC	KUR	NW	2011-03-17	1,370	3	1,745	6			56	0	2	0					3,173	9	85	3,258	4,115	79.17%	UNP
48	Maharagama	UC	COL	WE	2011-03-17	34,536	12	24,907	8			4,351	1	4,267	1					68,061	22	2,772	70,833	122,360	57.89%	UPFA
49	Mannar	UC	MAN	NO	2011-03-17	2,848	2	272	0	4,757	5			241	0					8,118	7	345	8,463	15,979	52.96%	TNA
50	Minuwangoda	UC	GAM	WE	2011-07-23	3,162	8	1,523	3			95	0	2	0	48	0	2	0	4,832	11	124	4,956	6,182	80.17%	UPFA
51	Nawalapitiya	UC	KAN	CE	2011-03-17	3,454	6	2,046	3			74	0							5,574	9	246	5,820	8,586	67.78%	UPFA
52	Panadura	UC	KAL	WE	2011-03-17	8,521	6	4,725	2			559	0	759	1					14,564	9	543	15,107	23,498	64.29%	UPFA
53	Peliyagoda	UC	GAM	WE	2011-03-17	6,436	6	4,340	3			226	0	2	0			3	0	11,007	9	438	11,445	15,759	72.63%	UPFA
54	Point Pedro	UC	JAF	NO	2011-07-23	1,107	2	115	0	3,263	7	1	0	7	0					4,493	9	270	4,763	7,376	64.57%	TNA
55	Puttalam	UC	PUT	NW	2011-03-17	6,766	5	3,273	1			78	0	3,773	2	1,335	1			15,225	9	512	15,737	23,624	66.61%	UPFA
56	Seethawakapura	UC	COL	WE	2011-03-17	5,770	4	6,584	7			318	0	287	0			5	0	12,964	11	439	13,403	17,953	74.66%	UNP
57	Tangalle	UC	HAM	SO	2011-03-17	2,389	6	2,289	3			221	0	4	0					4,903	9	109	5,012	6,433	77.91%	UPFA
58	Thalawakele-Lindula	UC	NUW	CE	2011-07-23	1,988	7	1,002	2			6	0					75	0	3,071	9	102	3,173	4,187	75.78%	UPFA
59	Trincomalee	UC	TRI	EA	2011-03-17	4,137	2	2,044	1	11,601	8	519	1	429	0			790	0	19,520	12	560	20,080	31,927	62.89%	TNA
60	Valvetithurai	UC	JAF	NO	2011-07-23	653	2	93	0	2,416	7			2	0					3,164	9	230	3,394	5,550	61.15%	TNA
61	Vavuniya	UC	VAV	NO																						
62	Wattala-Mabole	UC	GAM	WE	2011-03-17	6,078	6	5,558	3			119	0	5	0			7	0	11,767	9	390	12,157	17,864	68.05%	UPFA
63	Wattegama	UC	KAN	CE	2011-03-17	2,177	5	1,612	3			89	0	479	1					4,357	9	172	4,529	6,331	71.54%	UPFA
64	Weligama	UC	MTR	SO	2011-03-17	7,246	7	3,622	3			164	0	18	0	353			0	11,403	10	289	11,692	15,694	74.50%	UPFA
65	Addalachenai	DC	AMP	EA	2011-03-17	4,991	2	594	0					192	0	12,512	7			18,289	9	408	18,697	25,510	73.29%	SLMC
66	Agalawatta	DC	KAL	WE	2011-07-23	14,122	9	5,038	2			332	0	8	0			10	0	19,510	11	896	20,406	27,450	74.34%	UPFA
67	Akkaraipattu	DC	AMP	EA	2011-03-17	2,261	6	7	0					56	0	775	1			3,099	7	81	3,180	4,074	78.06%	NC (UPFA)
68	Akmeemana	DC	GAL	SO	2011-07-23	22,743	10	7,814	3			1,567	1							32,124	14	1,825	33,949	53,871	63.02%	UPFA
69	Akurana	DC	KAN	CE	2011-07-23	12,763	7	10,026	4			169	0	46	0	6,175	3			29,179	14	1,116	30,295	42,739	70.88%	NOC (UPFA)
70	Akuressa	DC	MTR	SO	2011-07-23	19,566	9	5,018	2			1,407	1	652	0			9	0	26,652	12	1,122	27,774	38,792	71.60%	UPFA
71	Alaiyadivembu	DC	AMP	EA	2011-03-17	1,960	2	370	0	4,700	5			1,909	1			859	1	9,798	9	397	10,195	15,358	66.38%	TNA
72	Alawwa	DC	KUR	NW	2011-03-17	19,330	9	11,455	4			840	0	54	0					31,679	13	1,236	32,915	48,194	68.30%	UPFA
73	Ambagamuwa	DC	NUW	CE	2011-03-17	31,096	11	20,788	6			664	0	1,792	1			15,727	5	70,067	23	5,278	75,345	113,583	66.33%	NOC (UPFA)
74	Ambalangoda	DC	GAL	SO	2011-03-17	12,238	6	11,331	4			995	0	3,728	1			29	0	28,321	11	1,200	29,521	42,064	70.18%	UPFA
75	Ambalantota	DC	HAM	SO	2011-03-17	18,535	10	9,961	4			4,388	2	36	0			21	0	32,941	16	1,432	34,373	51,320	66.98%	UPFA
76	Ambanganga Korale	DC	MTL	CE	2011-03-17	4,427	6	3,332	3			88	0	106	0					7,953	9	490	8,443	12,112	69.71%	UPFA
77	Anamaduwa	DC	PUT	NW	2011-03-17	20,376	11	9,077	4			628	0	2,339	1					32,420	16	1,538	33,958	53,720	63.21%	UPFA
78	Angunakolapellessa	DC	HAM	SO	2011-03-17	14,404	7	6,822	2			2,040	1	175	0					23,441	10	1,135	24,576	35,431	69.36%	UPFA
79	Arachchikattuwa	DC	PUT	NW	2011-03-17	19,414	9	5,906	2			518	0	160	0	815	1			26,813	12	1,080	27,893	44,782	62.29%	UPFA
80	Aranayake	DC	KEG	SA	2011-03-17	23,622	12	10,089	4			601	0							34,312	16	2,127	36,439	54,539	66.81%	UPFA
81	Attanagalle	DC	GAM	WE	2011-07-23	54,363	17	18,124	5			2,493	1					169	0	75,149	23	3,663	78,812	125,132	62.98%	UPFA
82	Aturaliya	DC	MTR	SO	2011-03-17	8,461	6	4,540	2			1,033	1	956	0			4	0	14,994	9	627	15,621	23,752	65.77%	UPFA
83	Ayagama	DC	RAT	SA	2011-03-17	10,950	7	4,010	2			214	0	23	0					15,197	9	692	15,889	21,145	75.14%	UPFA
84	Badalkumbura	DC	MON	UV	2011-03-17	10,336	6	6,892	3			334	0	1,159	0			152	0	18,873	9	1,046	19,919	29,896	66.63%	UPFA
85	Baddegama	DC	GAL	SO	2011-07-23	23,648	11	7,879	3			984	1	3,011	1			2,683	1	38,205	17	1,885	40,090	55,654	72.03%	UPFA
86	Badulla	DC	BAD	UV	2011-03-17	8,056	6	6,700	3			270	0					483	0	15,509	9	940	16,449	23,268	70.69%	UPFA
87	Balangoda	DC	RAT	SA	2011-07-23	20,304	14	8,457	5			335	0							29,096	19	1,820	30,916	44,054	70.18%	UPFA
88	Balapitiya	DC	GAL	SO	2011-03-17	19,061	11	12,400	6			1,057	0	26	0					32,544	17	1,386	33,930	50,513	67.17%	UPFA
89	Bandaragama	DC	KAL	WE	2011-03-17	40,013	11	23,669	5			2,224	1	4,857	1			44	0	70,807	18	2,908	73,715	107,223	68.75%	UPFA
90	Bandarawela	DC	BAD	UV	2011-03-17	10,037	6	7,768	3			483	0	8	0	60	0	636	0	18,992	9	983	19,975	29,007	68.86%	UPFA
91	Beliatte	DC	HAM	SO	2011-03-17	19,047	10	8,935	3			1,838	1	17	0					29,837	14	1,175	31,012	43,428	71.41%	UPFA
92	Bentota	DC	GAL	SO	2011-03-17	16,777	8	7,946	3			1,395	1	12	0					26,130	12	994	27,124	36,930	73.45%	UPFA
93	Beruwala	DC	KAL	WE	2011-03-17	28,920	12	17,728	6			1,594	1			4,030	1	5,963	2	58,235	22	2,243	60,478	84,537	71.54%	UPFA
94	Bibila	DC	MON	UV	2011-03-17	10,746	7	5,550	2			717	0							17,013	9	1,188	18,201	28,357	64.19%	UPFA
95	Bingiriya	DC	KUR	NW	2011-03-17	17,535	8	12,325	4			398	0	6	0			11	0	30,275	12	1,048	31,323	45,076	69.49%	UPFA
96	Biyagama	DC	GAM	WE	2011-03-17	38,563	13	28,838	8			2,117	1	2,629	1			26	0	72,173	23	2,336	74,509	109,931	67.78%	UPFA
97	Bope-Poddala	DC	GAL	SO	2011-03-17	14,603	7	10,453	3			1,578	1	671	0			8	0	27,313	11	1,142	28,455	43,388	65.58%	UPFA
98	Bulathkohupitiya	DC	KEG	SA	2011-03-17	14,356	7	7,567	3			354	0	26	0					22,303	10	1,164	23,467	35,010	67.03%	UPFA
99	Bulathsinhala	DC	KAL	WE	2011-03-17	19,848	9	7,633	3			751	0	1,832	0			18	0	30,082	12	1,536	31,618	44,691	70.75%	UPFA
100	Buttala	DC	MON	UV	2011-03-17	11,569	6	8,643	3			539	0	854	1			86	0	21,691	10	1,072	22,763	35,244	64.59%	UPFA
101	Chavakachcheri	DC	JAF	NO	2011-07-23	3,161	2	667	1	12,565	12	2	0	343	0					16,738	15	1,494	18,232	37,015	49.26%	TNA
102	Chilaw	DC	PUT	NW	2011-07-23	23,607	12	10,532	5			390	0							34,529	17	1,925	36,454	63,446	57.46%	UPFA
103	Damana	DC	AMP	EA	2011-03-17	10,960	7	4,986	2			288	0	15	0					16,249	9	689	16,938	23,899	70.87%	UPFA
104	Dambulla	DC	MTL	CE	2011-03-17	14,707	11	7,122	4			338	0							22,167	15	1,177	23,344	31,897	73.19%	UPFA
105	Dehiattakandiya	DC	AMP	EA	2011-03-17	14,448	12	10,685	7			485	0	2,116	2					27,734	21	1,221	28,955	40,099	72.21%	UPFA
106	Dehiowita	DC	KEG	SA	2011-03-17	21,486	13	12,959	6			680	0	17	0					35,142	19	2,065	37,207	55,704	66.79%	UPFA
107	Delft	DC	JAF	NO	2011-07-23	1,609	8	83	0	216	1									1,908	9	102	2,010	3,085	65.15%	UPFA
108	Deraniyagala	DC	KEG	SA	2011-03-17	9,790	7	9,626	4			397	0	9	0			5	0	19,827	11	965	20,792	31,169	66.71%	UPFA
109	Devinuwara	DC	MTR	SO	2011-03-17	12,153	7	7,500	3			1,233	1					11	0	20,897	11	795	21,692	34,662	62.58%	UPFA
110	Dickwella	DC	MTR	SO	2011-03-17	16,055	10	8,828	4			1,140	0					91	0	26,114	14	1,000	27,114	40,413	67.09%	UPFA
111	Dimbulagala	DC	POL	NC	2011-03-17	22,553	8	12,177	4			947	0	98	0			18	0	35,793	12	1,752	37,545	55,479	67.67%	UPFA
112	Divulapitiya	DC	GAM	WE	2011-03-17	38,341	14	24,522	8			1,754	0	129	0			30	0	64,776	22	2,470	67,246	101,185	66.46%	UPFA
113	Dodangoda	DC	KAL	WE	2011-03-17	15,325	8	11,754	4			771	0	1,499	1			13	0	29,362	13	1,305	30,667	43,402	70.66%	UPFA
114	Dompe	DC	GAM	WE	2011-03-17	38,384	13	25,865	8			1,941	1	429	0			56	0	66,675	22	2,566	69,241	105,793	65.45%	UPFA
115	Eheliyagoda	DC	RAT	SA	2011-03-17	20,087	11	10,749	5			497	0	1,075	0	512	0	175	0	33,095	16	1,400	34,495	50,494	68.32%	UPFA
116	Elehera	DC	POL	NC	2011-07-23	17,869	8	2,950	1			494	0	382	0			176	0	21,871	9	1,194	23,065	32,574	70.81%	UPFA
117	Ella	DC	BAD	UV	2011-03-17	9,862	6	8,371	3			321	0					1,522	1	20,076	10	1,395	21,471	32,592	65.88%	UPFA
118	Elpitiya	DC	GAL	SO	2011-07-23	19,954	10	10,427	4			1,100	0	2,539	1			66	0	34,086	15	1,474	35,560	49,113	72.40%	UPFA
119	Embilipitiya	DC	RAT	SA	2011-03-17	24,035	9	14,277	4			1,671	1	392	0					40,375	14	2,143	42,518	70,710	60.13%	UPFA
120	Eravurpattu	DC	BAT	EA																						
121	Galenbindunuwewa	DC	ANU	NC	2011-03-17	14,567	7	4,989	2			954	0	1,098	0			1,697	1	23,305	10	992	24,297	34,030	71.40%	UPFA
122	Galewela	DC	MTL	CE	2011-03-17	21,441	10	11,432	4			503	0	17	0	969	1			34,362	15	1,149	35,511	51,462	69.00%	UPFA
123	Galgamuwa	DC	KUR	NW	2011-03-17	22,325	12	11,592	5			1,291	1	25	0					35,233	18	2,017	37,250	61,155	60.91%	UPFA
124	Galigamuwa	DC	KEG	SA	2011-03-17	23,700	13	11,245	5			1,039	0	26	0					36,010	18	1,747	37,757	56,758	66.52%	UPFA
125	Galnewa	DC	ANU	NC	2011-07-23	16,350	8	3,061	1			536	0	705	0					20,652	9	1,083	21,735	32,560	66.75%	UPFA
126	Gampaha	DC	GAM	WE	2011-03-17	35,052	13	17,256	5			2,632	1	1,309	0			35	0	56,284	19	2,318	58,602	90,085	65.05%	UPFA
127	Ganga Ihala Korale	DC	KAN	CE	2011-03-17	16,290	9	6,841	3			369	0	490	0					23,990	12	1,798	25,788	39,869	64.68%	UPFA
128	Giribawa	DC	KUR	NW	2011-07-23	11,099	7	3,745	2			620	0	4	0					15,468	9	848	16,316	21,144	77.17%	UPFA
129	Godakawela	DC	RAT	SA	2011-03-17	19,055	10	11,947	5			440	0	506	0					31,948	15	1,664	33,612	51,311	65.51%	UPFA
130	Gomarankadawala	DC	TRI	EA	2011-03-17	3,674	8	482	1			127	0	2	0					4,285	9	220	4,505	5,831	77.26%	UPFA
131	Habaraduwa	DC	GAL	SO	2011-03-17	17,236	8	10,254	4			1,277	1	855	0					29,622	13	1,122	30,744	43,779	70.23%	UPFA
132	Hakmana	DC	MTR	SO	2011-03-17	10,776	7	3,911	2			726	0	711	0					16,124	9	664	16,788	24,586	68.28%	UPFA
133	Haldummulla	DC	BAD	UV	2011-03-17	8,927	7	6,324	3			261	0	537	0			775	1	16,824	11	1,367	18,191	26,842	67.77%	UPFA
134	Hali-Ela	DC	BAD	UV	2011-03-17	21,372	12	14,681	7			1,245	1	875	0			1,141	1	39,314	21	2,865	42,179	64,270	65.63%	UPFA
135	Hambantota	DC	HAM	SO	2011-10-08	11,836	6	3,788	1			853	0	7	0					16,484	7	596	17,080	23,511	72.65%	UPFA
136	Hanguranketa	DC	NUW	CE	2011-03-17	20,299	12	16,168	8			697	1	2,071	1			613	0	39,848	22	2,720	42,568	67,076	63.46%	UPFA
137	Haputale	DC	BAD	UV	2011-03-17	10,302	6	8,312	4			450	0	474	0			1,350	1	20,888	11	1,219	22,107	31,435	70.33%	UPFA
138	Harispattuwa	DC	KAN	CE	2011-07-23	19,967	11	13,892	6			822	1	1,590	1	644	0	135	0	37,050	19	1,915	38,965	64,172	60.72%	UPFA
139	Hingurakgoda	DC	POL	NC	2011-07-23	23,481	14	5,553	3			1,318	1							30,352	18	1,771	32,123	46,576	68.97%	UPFA
140	Homagama	DC	COL	WE	2011-07-23	62,332	19					10,135	3	6,675	1			211	0	79,353	23	5,449	84,802	160,840	52.72%	UPFA
141	Horana	DC	KAL	WE	2011-03-17	38,889	14	23,721	8			1,918	1	371	0			37	0	64,936	23	3,081	68,017	102,829	66.15%	UPFA
142	Horowpothana	DC	ANU	NC	2011-03-17	11,129	8	4,458	2			239	0	971	1	451			0	17,248	11	632	17,880	23,630	75.67%	UPFA
143	Ibbagamuwa	DC	KUR	NW	2011-03-17	28,189	13	21,040	8			989	0	1,546	1			25	0	51,789	22	2,642	54,431	92,875	58.61%	UPFA
144	Imaduwa	DC	GAL	SO	2011-03-17	13,567	7	7,324	2			871	0							21,762	9	898	22,660	33,017	68.63%	UPFA
145	Imbulpe	DC	RAT	SA	2011-03-17	17,500	9	8,841	4			320	0	11	0			8	0	26,680	13	1,301	27,981	40,620	68.88%	UPFA
146	Ipalogama	DC	ANU	NC	2011-03-17	10,030	6	5,620	3			420	0			494	0			16,564	9	809	17,373	26,383	65.85%	UPFA
147	Irakkamam	DC	AMP	EA	2011-03-17	2,952	2	224	0			6	0			3,196	5			6,378	7	136	6,514	8,185	79.58%	SLMC
148	Ja-Ela	DC	GAM	WE	2011-03-17	36,365	13	25,077	7			1,935	1	32	0			2,741	1	66,150	22	2,408	68,558	109,344	62.70%	UPFA
149	Kahatagasdigiliya	DC	ANU	NC	2011-03-17	9,998	6	5,790	2			558	0	5	0	799	0	1,706	1	18,856	9	764	19,620	26,589	73.79%	UPFA
150	Kahawatte	DC	RAT	SA	2011-03-17	8,708	5	6,607	3			165	0	2,773	1					18,253	9	1,048	19,301	28,618	67.44%	UPFA
151	Kalawana	DC	RAT	SA	2011-03-17	14,551	7	6,483	2			334	0	25	0			7	0	21,400	9	923	22,323	31,210	71.53%	UPFA
152	Kalpitiya	DC	PUT	NW	2011-03-17	23,093	10	6,736	3			128	0	3,484	1					33,441	14	1,512	34,953	54,458	64.18%	UPFA
153	Kalutara	DC	KAL	WE	2011-03-17	27,129	12	20,499	7			2,156	1	7,032	2			40	0	56,856	22	2,285	59,141	85,546	69.13%	UPFA
154	Kamburupitiya	DC	MTR	SO	2011-03-17	13,991	7	4,897	2			675	0	475	0					20,038	9	873	20,911	30,908	67.66%	UPFA
155	Kandeketiya	DC	BAD	UV	2011-03-17	6,917	6	4,380	3			179	0	6	0					11,482	9	682	12,164	17,329	70.19%	UPFA
156	Kandy Gravets & Gangawata Korale	DC	KAN	CE	2011-10-08	14,083	8	9,418	4			425	0	1,164	0			7	0	25,097	12	959	26,056	40,391	64.51%	UPFA
157	Kantalai	DC	TRI	EA	2011-07-23	14,270	8	5,820	3			796	0	996	0					21,882	11	1,198	23,080	30,898	74.70%	UPFA
158	Karachchi	DC	KIL	NO	2011-07-23	6,097	4	133	0	18,609	15	39	0							24,878	19	3,190	28,068	42,800	65.58%	TNA
159	Karainagar	DC	JAF	NO	2011-07-23	1,667	1	921	1	1,781	3	3	0							4,372	5	333	4,705	8,140	57.80%	TNA
160	Karaitivu	DC	AMP	EA	2011-07-23	1,134	0	50	0	4,284	4			144	0	2,364	1	152	0	8,128	5	199	8,327	12,044	69.14%	TNA
161	Karandeniya	DC	GAL	SO	2011-03-17	17,044	7	9,469	3			1,459	1	1,166	0			6	0	29,144	11	1,326	30,470	46,240	65.90%	UPFA
162	Karuwalagaswewa	DC	PUT	NW	2011-03-17	8,118	8	2,064	2			123	0	63	0			185	0	10,553	10	493	11,046	16,234	68.04%	UPFA
163	Katana	DC	GAM	WE	2011-03-17	40,467	14	24,297	7			1,744	1	52	0					66,560	22	3,014	69,574	105,033	66.24%	UPFA
164	Kataragama	DC	MON	UV	2011-03-17	4,595	7	3,193	3			302	0	4	0					8,094	10	296	8,390	11,649	72.02%	UPFA
165	Katuwana	DC	HAM	SO	2011-03-17	18,423	9	11,971	5			1,872	1	335	0			12	0	32,613	15	1,562	34,175	51,167	66.79%	UPFA
166	Kayts	DC	JAF	NO	2011-07-23	2,833	4	20	0	805	1									3,658	5	340	3,998	6,349	62.97%	UPFA
167	Kebithigollewa	DC	ANU	NC	2011-03-17	8,631	8	2,533	2			172	0							11,336	10	518	11,854	14,701	80.63%	UPFA
168	Kegalle	DC	KEG	SA	2011-03-17	23,118	12	10,979	5			803	0	116	0			76	0	35,092	17	1,749	36,841	56,787	64.88%	UPFA
169	Kekirawa	DC	ANU	NC	2011-03-17	20,238	9	10,078	4			724	0	127	0			2,063	1	33,230	14	1,632	34,862	51,565	67.61%	UPFA
170	Kelaniya	DC	GAM	WE	2011-03-17	27,428	15	14,072	6			1,648	1	597	0			19	0	43,764	22	1,451	45,215	68,163	66.33%	UPFA
171	Kinniya	DC	TRI	EA	2011-03-17	6,471	5	3,579	2			88	0	4	0			294	0	10,436	7	364	10,800	16,626	64.96%	UPFA
172	Kirinda Puhulwella	DC	MTR	SO	2011-03-17	8,276	5	1,878	1			319	0					9	0	10,482	6	371	10,853	15,803	68.68%	UPFA
173	Kobaigane	DC	KUR	NW	2011-03-17	10,490	6	6,644	3			209	0	3	0			83	0	17,429	9	635	18,064	26,504	68.16%	UPFA
174	Kolonna	DC	RAT	SA	2011-03-17	10,075	6	10,074	3			903	0	15	0			9	0	21,076	9	1,053	22,129	33,376	66.30%	UPFA
175	Koralaipattu	DC	BAT	EA																						
176	Koralaipattu North	DC	BAT	EA																						
177	Koralaipattu West	DC	BAT	EA	2011-03-17	8,816	7	1,581	1	329	0	26	0	8	0	966	1	491	0	12,217	9	431	12,648	17,885	70.72%	UPFA
178	Kotapola	DC	MTR	SO	2011-03-17	13,246	8	8,649	4			1,061	0	32	0			12	0	23,000	12	1,380	24,380	40,412	60.33%	UPFA
179	Kotikawatte-Mulleriyawa	DC	COL	WE	2011-10-08	37,998	16	12,269	5			1,285	0	21	0			5	0	51,578	21	1,734	53,312	78,144	68.22%	UPFA
180	Kotmale	DC	NUW	CE	2011-03-17	19,929	11	15,348	7			591	0	3,026	1			6,120	3	45,014	22	2,760	47,774	71,585	66.74%	NOC (UPFA)
181	Kuchchaveli	DC	TRI	EA	2011-07-23	8,451	6	1,639	1	2,961	2	8	0	2	0					13,061	9	543	13,604	20,872	65.18%	UPFA
182	Kuliyapitiya	DC	KUR	NW	2011-07-23	34,077	14	18,816	7			1,103	0	1,245	0	1,678	1	16	0	56,935	22	2,195	59,130	92,160	64.16%	UPFA
183	Kundasale	DC	KAN	CE	2011-10-08	34,488	14	16,934	6			1,561	1	2,128	1	1,197	0			56,308	22	2,389	58,697	88,903	66.02%	UPFA
184	Kurunegala	DC	KUR	NW	2011-03-17	32,448	13	22,634	8			2,449	1	61	0	1,260	0			58,852	22	2,676	61,528	101,057	60.88%	UPFA
185	Kuruwita	DC	RAT	SA	2011-03-17	33,305	14	17,365	7			754	0	3,552	1			31	0	55,007	22	2,521	57,528	88,447	65.04%	UPFA
186	Laggala Pallegama	DC	MTL	CE	2011-03-17	4,691	7	1,808	2			144	0							6,643	9	406	7,049	9,388	75.09%	UPFA
187	Lahugala	DC	AMP	EA	2011-03-17	2,304	4	2,433	7			37	0							4,774	11	222	4,996	5,861	85.24%	UNP
188	Lankapura	DC	POL	NC	2011-03-17	12,739	9	4,469	3			291	0	7	0			238	0	17,744	12	617	18,361	24,788	74.07%	UPFA
189	Lunugala	DC	BAD	UV	2011-03-17	7,787	7	4,792	3			156	0					1,766	1	14,501	11	1,153	15,654	24,403	64.15%	UPFA
190	Lunugamvehera	DC	HAM	SO	2011-03-17	8,259	6	5,751	3			901	0	6	0					14,917	9	560	15,477	21,338	72.53%	UPFA
191	Madulla	DC	MON	UV	2011-03-17	8,622	7	3,487	2			610	0	652	1					13,371	10	729	14,100	22,234	63.42%	UPFA
192	Madurawala	DC	KAL	WE	2011-03-17	9,886	6	5,746	2			505	0	16	0			16	0	16,169	8	630	16,799	23,571	71.27%	UPFA
193	Maha Oya	DC	AMP	EA	2011-03-17	5,501	7	2,866	3			246	0	26	0					8,639	10	471	9,110	12,607	72.26%	UPFA
194	Mahara	DC	GAM	WE	2011-03-17	50,996	15	28,713	7			3,563	1	770	0			48	0	84,090	23	3,125	87,215	136,686	63.81%	UPFA
195	Mahawa	DC	KUR	NW	2011-03-17	22,719	12	12,655	5			1,231	1	1,279	0					37,884	18	1,448	39,332	60,990	64.49%	UPFA
196	Mahiyanganaya	DC	BAD	UV	2011-03-17	17,125	8	10,890	4			1,235	0							29,250	12	2,042	31,292	52,035	60.14%	UPFA
197	Malimbada	DC	MTR	SO	2011-03-17	8,436	6	8,135	3			765	0					20	0	17,356	9	560	17,916	26,191	68.41%	UPFA
198	Manmunai Pattu	DC	BAT	EA																						
199	Manmunai South & Eruvilpattu	DC	BAT	EA																						
200	Manmunai South West	DC	BAT	EA																						
201	Manmunai West	DC	BAT	EA																						
202	Mannar	DC	MAN	NO	2011-03-17	4,619	2	62	0	5,061	5			8	0	3,906	2			13,656	9	434	14,090	24,658	57.14%	TNA
203	Manthai East	DC	MUL	NO	2011-03-17	920	3	3	0	1,223	6							56	0	2,202	9	146	2,348	5,578	42.09%	TNA
204	Manthai West	DC	MAN	NO	2011-03-17	3,185	4	17	0	3,898	7			4	0	1,336	1			8,440	12	403	8,843	18,707	47.27%	TNA
205	MaritimePattu	DC	MUL	NO																						
206	Matale	DC	MTL	CE	2011-03-17	9,207	10	7,481	7			327	0	502	1					17,517	18	937	18,454	27,023	68.29%	UPFA
207	Matara	DC	MTR	SO	2011-03-17	10,476	10	8,042	7			1,540	1					16	0	20,074	18	799	20,873	30,135	69.26%	UPFA
208	Mathugama	DC	KAL	WE	2011-03-17	22,827	11	12,291	5			1,820	1	2,247	1			65	0	39,250	18	1,692	40,942	57,439	71.28%	UPFA
209	Mawanella	DC	KEG	SA	2011-03-17	26,508	13	23,669	9			703	0	36	0					50,916	22	2,301	53,217	79,793	66.69%	UPFA
210	Mawathagama	DC	KUR	NW	2011-07-23	19,100	9	9,535	4			488	0	195	0	383	0	84	0	29,785	13	1,552	31,337	47,340	66.20%	UPFA
211	Medadumbara	DC	KAN	CE	2011-03-17	13,698	10	12,112	7			657	0	361	0			808	1	27,636	18	1,725	29,361	45,222	64.93%	UPFA
212	Medagama	DC	MON	UV	2011-03-17	8,380	6	6,326	3			346	0	727	0	165	0			15,944	9	912	16,856	25,608	65.82%	UPFA
213	Medawachchiya	DC	ANU	NC	2011-03-17	14,557	7	5,634	2			678	0							20,869	9	1,080	21,949	30,455	72.07%	UPFA
214	Medirigiriya	DC	POL	NC	2011-03-17	20,924	12	10,558	5			711	0	846	0					33,039	17	1,532	34,571	48,680	71.02%	UPFA
215	Meegahakivula	DC	BAD	UV	2011-03-17	5,633	6	3,558	3			188	0	344	0					9,723	9	585	10,308	14,311	72.03%	UPFA
216	Mihintale	DC	ANU	NC	2011-03-17	8,294	6	3,733	2			613	1	590	0			573	0	13,803	9	573	14,376	20,835	69.00%	UPFA
217	Minipe	DC	KAN	CE	2011-03-17	16,147	9	7,931	3			289	0	8	0			4	0	24,379	12	1,293	25,672	38,043	67.48%	UPFA
218	Minuwangoda	DC	GAM	WE	2011-03-17	42,217	14	25,973	8			2,341	1					1,205	0	71,736	23	3,053	74,789	116,001	64.47%	UPFA
219	Mirigama	DC	GAM	WE	2011-03-17	32,111	12	31,837	9			2,784	1	2,491	1			453	0	69,676	23	2,940	72,616	115,629	62.80%	UPFA
220	Moneragala	DC	MON	UV	2011-07-23	16,932	8	3,115	1			348	0	6	0			523	0	20,924	9	1,399	22,323	33,277	67.08%	UPFA
221	Morawewa	DC	TRI	EA	2011-03-17	2,288	6	1,528	3			133	0							3,949	9	278	4,227	8,659	48.82%	UPFA
222	Mulatiyana	DC	MTR	SO	2011-03-17	15,629	8	6,724	3			1,002	0	2,069	1					25,424	12	1,220	26,644	37,642	70.78%	UPFA
223	Musali	DC	MAN	NO	2011-03-17	5,052	6	23	0	872	1	17	0	1	0	2,202	2			8,167	9	248	8,415	13,151	63.99%	UPFA
224	Muttur	DC	TRI	EA	2011-03-17	12,739	7	2,586	1	6,918	3	184	0	516	0			31	0	22,974	11	904	23,878	37,731	63.28%	UPFA
225	Nagoda	DC	GAL	SO	2011-03-17	18,085	9	9,291	4			973	0	259	0			15	0	28,623	13	1,223	29,846	39,957	74.70%	UPFA
226	Nallur	DC	JAF	NO	2011-07-23	2,238	2	105	0	10,207	10									12,550	12	707	13,257	22,012	60.23%	TNA
227	Namal Oya	DC	AMP	EA	2011-03-17	6,369	6	4,460	3			291	0	476	0					11,596	9	447	12,043	16,715	72.05%	UPFA
228	Nanaddan	DC	MAN	NO	2011-03-17	3,270	3	19	0	5,845	6	12	0							9,146	9	399	9,545	16,421	58.13%	TNA
229	Narammala	DC	KUR	NW	2011-03-17	14,714	7	10,420	3			533	0	1,893	1			262	0	27,822	11	935	28,757	41,935	68.58%	UPFA
230	Nattandiya	DC	PUT	NW	2011-03-17	28,881	14	18,089	8					233	0			698	0	47,901	22	2,008	49,909	84,303	59.20%	UPFA
231	Naula	DC	MTL	CE	2011-03-17	7,412	5	6,604	3			294	0	1,201	1					15,511	9	808	16,319	22,699	71.89%	UPFA
232	Navagattegama	DC	PUT	NW	2011-07-23	6,567	8	1,237	1			122	0	388	0					8,314	9	281	8,595	11,324	75.90%	UPFA
233	Navithanveli	DC	AMP	EA	2011-03-17	1,075	1	327	0	3,186	4					2,037	1	1,769	1	8,394	7	400	8,794	12,799	68.71%	TNA
234	Neluwa	DC	GAL	SO	2011-03-17	9,864	7	3,790	2			587	0	29	0			3	0	14,273	9	688	14,961	19,250	77.72%	UPFA
235	Nikaweratiya	DC	KUR	NW	2011-03-17	20,484	11	14,554	6			1,294	1	2,161	1			28	0	38,521	19	1,738	40,259	62,250	64.67%	UPFA
236	Ninthavur	DC	AMP	EA	2011-03-17	2,468	1	467	0					3	0	10,355	6			13,293	7	309	13,602	19,124	71.13%	SLMC
237	Nivitigala	DC	RAT	SA	2011-03-17	25,550	9	12,018	3			506	0	3,255	1			14	0	41,343	13	2,173	43,516	65,077	66.87%	UPFA
238	Niyagama	DC	GAL	SO	2011-03-17	10,781	6	8,193	3			701	0					12	0	19,687	9	794	20,481	27,340	74.91%	UPFA
239	Nochchiyagama	DC	ANU	NC	2011-03-17	16,177	8	5,756	2			600	0	822	1					23,355	11	1,165	24,520	34,666	70.73%	UPFA
240	Nuwara Eliya	DC	NUW	CE	2011-03-17			18,198	7			716	0	1,418	1			31,940	15	52,272	23	5,758	58,030	108,101	53.68%	NOC (UCPF)
241	Nuwaragam; Palatha Central	DC	ANU	NC	2011-07-23	24,473	12	5,713	2			640	0							30,826	14	1,881	32,707	48,699	67.16%	UPFA
242	Nuwaragam; Palatha East	DC	ANU	NC	2011-03-17	12,654	7	6,459	2			1,593	1	1,328	0					22,034	10	1,047	23,081	36,559	63.13%	UPFA
243	Pachchilaipalli	DC	KIL	NO	2011-07-23	1,184	3	114	0	1,650	6	4	0							2,952	9	339	3,291	7,116	46.25%	TULF (TNA)
244	Padavi Siripura	DC	TRI	EA	2011-03-17	3,682	6	922	1			273	0	1,524	2					6,401	9	241	6,642	8,362	79.43%	UPFA
245	Padaviya	DC	ANU	NC	2011-03-17	9,118	9	1,778	2			296	0							11,192	11	515	11,707	15,431	75.87%	UPFA
246	Padiyatalawa	DC	AMP	EA	2011-03-17	5,003	7	2,748	3			477	1							8,228	11	415	8,643	11,686	73.96%	UPFA
247	Palagala	DC	ANU	NC	2011-03-17	11,458	7	4,996	2			233	0	5	0			709	0	17,401	9	783	18,184	24,991	72.76%	UPFA
248	Palindanuwara	DC	KAL	WE	2011-03-17	14,562	9	10,235	5			453	0					18	0	25,268	14	1,321	26,589	36,134	73.58%	UPFA
249	Pallepola	DC	MTL	CE	2011-03-17			6,180	3			460	0	7,081	6					13,721	9	1,126	14,847	22,647	65.56%	Ind (UPFA)
250	Panadura	DC	KAL	WE	2011-03-17	33,549	13	20,416	7			2,871	1	5,552	2	976	0	343	0	63,707	23	2,328	66,035	97,965	67.41%	UPFA
251	Panduwasnuwara	DC	KUR	NW	2011-03-17	28,257	13	19,524	8			704	0			523	0	19	0	49,027	21	1,564	50,591	70,587	71.67%	UPFA
252	Pannala	DC	KUR	NW	2011-03-17	32,552	13	23,080	8			1,405	1	15	0			23	0	57,075	22	2,232	59,307	89,566	66.22%	UPFA
253	Panwila	DC	KAN	CE	2011-03-17	4,831	5	4,709	3			106	0	301	0	787	1			10,734	9	1,045	11,779	17,809	66.14%	UPFA
254	Pasbaga Korale	DC	KAN	CE	2011-03-17	11,487	7	5,526	3			576	0					1,819	1	19,408	11	1,707	21,115	31,626	66.76%	UPFA
255	Pasgoda	DC	MTR	SO	2011-03-17	16,018	9	8,688	4			769	0	372	0					25,847	13	1,441	27,288	41,922	65.09%	UPFA
256	Passara	DC	BAD	UV	2011-03-17	9,065	4	9,183	6			378	0	2,237	0	10	0	1,938	1	22,811	11	1,543	24,354	36,151	67.37%	UNP
257	Pathadumbara	DC	KAN	CE	2011-03-17	14,761	8	14,122	6			511	0			2,426	1	821	0	32,641	15	1,577	34,218	54,637	62.63%	UPFA
258	Pathahewaheta	DC	KAN	CE	2011-03-17	17,540	8	20,330	12			627	0	1,437	1	1,179	1	164	0	41,277	22	2,068	43,345	65,411	66.27%	UNP
259	Pelmadulla	DC	RAT	SA	2011-03-17	21,236	12	15,958	7			557	0	503	0			491	0	38,745	19	1,821	40,566	59,596	68.07%	UPFA
260	Pitabeddara	DC	MTR	SO	2011-03-17	12,915	7	6,691	3			1,068	0	22	0					20,696	10	1,094	21,790	35,024	62.21%	UPFA
261	Point Pedro	DC	JAF	NO	2011-07-23	3,022	2	133	0	8,938	7			57	0					12,150	9	1,031	13,181	25,375	51.94%	TNA
262	Polgahawela	DC	KUR	NW	2011-07-23	29,238	15	11,165	5			1,797	1	36	0			17	0	42,253	21	2,019	44,272	74,597	59.35%	UPFA
263	Polpithigama	DC	KUR	NW	2011-03-17	21,145	10	12,027	5			1,517	1	1,255	0			10	0	35,954	16	1,654	37,608	57,713	65.16%	UPFA
264	Poonakary	DC	KIL	NO	2011-07-23	3,689	4			3,827	6					154	0			7,670	10	799	8,469	11,301	74.94%	TULF (TNA)
265	Porativupattu	DC	BAT	EA																						
266	Pottuvil	DC	AMP	EA	2011-03-17	3,031	2	656	0	1,162	1	26	0	1,662	0	7,457	6			13,994	9	573	14,567	21,398	68.08%	SLMC
267	Pujapitiya	DC	KAN	CE	2011-03-17	14,466	8	10,518	5			785	0	1,570	1	713	0			28,052	14	1,236	29,288	43,108	67.94%	UPFA
268	Puthukudiyiruppu	DC	MUL	NO																						
269	Puttalam	DC	PUT	NW	2011-03-17	7,534	6	4,887	2			219	0	947	1	449	0	37	0	14,073	9	606	14,679	21,875	67.10%	UPFA
270	Rajanganaya	DC	ANU	NC	2011-07-23	13,947	8	3,344	1			410	0					214	0	17,915	9	784	18,699	25,273	73.99%	UPFA
271	Rajgama	DC	GAL	SO	2011-03-17	24,588	10	9,420	3			1,077	1	626	0			100	0	35,811	14	1,579	37,390	54,167	69.03%	UPFA
272	Rambewa	DC	ANU	NC	2011-03-17	10,345	6	5,640	3			640	0			254	0			16,879	9	661	17,540	23,879	73.45%	UPFA
273	Rambukkana	DC	KEG	SA	2011-03-17	24,437	13	12,878	6			1,007	0					55	0	38,377	19	2,256	40,633	62,800	64.70%	UPFA
274	Ratnapura	DC	RAT	SA	2011-07-23	23,399	16	9,827	6			299	0	12	0			420	0	33,957	22	1,939	35,896	47,529	75.52%	UPFA
275	Rattota	DC	MTL	CE	2011-03-17	11,792	7	9,843	5			349	0							21,984	12	1,822	23,806	37,359	63.72%	UPFA
276	Ridigama	DC	KUR	NW	2011-03-17	19,933	11	16,510	7			1,201	0	24	0			3,824	2	41,492	20	2,043	43,535	66,612	65.36%	UPFA
277	Ridimaliadda	DC	BAD	UV	2011-03-17	9,887	6	9,517	4			1,557	0					155	0	21,116	10	1,398	22,514	34,988	64.35%	UPFA
278	Ruwanwella	DC	KEG	SA	2011-07-23	20,734	11	7,728	4			680	0	17	0					29,159	15	1,602	30,761	47,197	65.18%	UPFA
279	Sammanthurai	DC	AMP	EA	2011-03-17	12,358	5	1,995	1			187	0	579	0	10,078	3			25,197	9	758	25,955	37,469	69.27%	UPFA
280	Seethawakapura	DC	COL	WE	2011-03-17	29,545	13	19,643	7			1,942	0	3,740	2			1,463	0	56,333	22	2,431	58,764	91,012	64.57%	UPFA
281	Seruvila	DC	TRI	EA	2011-07-23	4,471	7	728	1	649	1	120	0	623	0					6,591	9	325	6,916	9,130	75.75%	UPFA
282	Siyambalanduwa	DC	MON	UV	2011-07-23	16,193	9	5,970	2			378	0	19	0					22,560	11	1,445	24,005	36,920	65.02%	UPFA
283	Soranathota	DC	BAD	UV	2011-03-17	6,289	6	3,840	3			264	0					193	0	10,586	9	817	11,403	17,040	66.92%	UPFA
284	Suriyawewa	DC	HAM	SO	2011-10-08	14,279	4	5,388	1			838	0	5	0			2	0	20,512	5	868	21,380	29,894	71.52%	UPFA
285	Talawa	DC	ANU	NC	2011-03-17	25,219	11	13,438	5			1,863	1	2,036	1			726	0	43,282	18	1,907	45,189	65,390	69.11%	UPFA
286	Tamankaduwa	DC	POL	NC	2011-03-17	25,168	10	8,456	3			1,244	1	583	0			334	0	35,785	14	1,464	37,249	55,879	66.66%	UPFA
287	Tanamalwila	DC	MON	UV	2011-03-17	19,725	12	7,656	4			1,285	1	423	0					29,089	17	1,604	30,693	45,940	66.81%	UPFA
288	Tangalle	DC	HAM	SO	2011-03-17	18,034	9	8,827	3			2,561	1	32	0					29,454	13	1,190	30,644	44,505	68.86%	UPFA
289	Tawalama	DC	GAL	SO	2011-03-17	9,161	6	5,535	3			689	0	310	0					15,695	9	782	16,477	22,776	72.34%	UPFA
290	Thamplakamam	DC	TRI	EA	2011-03-17	6,174	6	4,737	3			92	0	147	0					11,150	9	542	11,692	17,125	68.27%	UPFA
291	Thihagoda	DC	MTR	SO	2011-03-17	10,889	7	5,281	2			780	0	34	0			7	0	16,991	9	644	17,635	26,152	67.43%	UPFA
292	Thirukkovil	DC	AMP	EA	2011-07-23	1,249	1	810	1	6,865	7							497	0	9,421	9	355	9,776	18,076	54.08%	TNA
293	Thumpane	DC	KAN	CE	2011-03-17	18,371	10	12,820	5			1,022	0	12	0	1,235	1			33,460	16	1,571	35,031	52,612	66.58%	UPFA
294	Thunukkai	DC	MUL	NO	2011-07-23			21	0	2,198	7							847	2	3,066	9	335	3,401	5,227	65.07%	TNA
295	Tirappane	DC	ANU	NC	2011-03-17	9,731	7	4,246	2			841	0	3	0	243			0	15,064	9	635	15,699	22,027	71.27%	UPFA
296	Tissamaharama	DC	HAM	SO	2011-03-17	14,523	7	8,344	3			7,767	2	11	0			43	0	30,688	12	1,141	31,829	47,454	67.07%	UPFA
297	Trincomalee; Town & Gravets	DC	TRI	EA	2011-07-23	6,353	3	2,869	1	8,986	5	169	0	11	0			347	0	18,735	9	901	19,636	31,791	61.77%	TNA
298	Udadumbara	DC	KAN	CE	2011-03-17	5,770	5	4,897	3			124	0	1,615	1					12,406	9	639	13,045	17,753	73.48%	UPFA
299	Udapalatha	DC	KAN	CE	2011-03-17	23,461	13	16,257	8			498	0	693	0			2,413	1	43,322	22	2,877	46,199	71,761	64.38%	UPFA
300	Udubaddawa	DC	KUR	NW	2011-03-17	13,235	6	10,781	4			515	0	30	0			474	0	25,035	10	745	25,780	37,970	67.90%	UPFA
301	Udunuwara	DC	KAN	CE	2011-03-17	24,422	12	20,415	8			1,134	1	40	0	768	0			46,779	21	2,404	49,183	76,994	63.88%	UPFA
302	Uhana	DC	AMP	EA	2011-03-17	15,823	9	10,007	5			518	0	2,124	1					28,472	15	1,152	29,624	40,694	72.80%	UPFA
303	Ukuwela	DC	MTL	CE	2011-07-23	16,390	9	9,928	4			515	0	2,146	1					28,979	14	1,693	30,672	47,553	64.50%	UPFA
304	Uva- Paranagama	DC	BAD	UV	2011-03-17	17,297	10	14,904	7			1,511	1					1,517	1	35,229	19	2,341	37,570	59,745	62.88%	UPFA
305	Vadamarachchi South West	DC	JAF	NO	2011-07-23	2,522	3	290	0	12,454	15			22	0					15,288	18	1,386	16,674	32,539	51.24%	TNA
306	Valikamam East	DC	JAF	NO	2011-07-23	6,635	5	113	0	16,763	16	27	0							23,538	21	2,302	25,840	46,570	55.49%	TNA
307	Valikamam North	DC	JAF	NO	2011-07-23	4,919	6	78	0	12,065	15									17,062	21	1,643	18,705	63,224	29.59%	TNA
308	Valikamam South	DC	JAF	NO	2011-07-23	4,027	3	435	0	12,895	13									17,357	16	1,674	19,031	32,857	57.92%	TNA
309	Valikamam South West	DC	JAF	NO	2011-07-23	4,428	4	216	0	11,954	12									16,598	16	1,771	18,369	31,022	59.21%	TNA
310	Valikamam West	DC	JAF	NO	2011-07-23	3,041	3	420	0	12,117	11									15,578	14	2,058	17,636	30,214	58.37%	TNA
311	Vanathawillu	DC	PUT	NW	2011-03-17	5,686	8	1,384	1			15	0	713	1					7,798	10	286	8,084	10,625	76.08%	UPFA
312	Vavuniya North	DC	VAV	NO	2011-03-17	1,463	4	608	1	2,253	8	36	0							4,360	13	429	4,789	10,955	43.72%	TNA
313	Vavuniya South Sinhala	DC	VAV	NO	2011-03-17	4,382	7	985	1			165	0	694	1					6,226	9	356	6,582	9,633	68.33%	UPFA
314	Vavuniya South Tamil	DC	VAV	NO	2011-03-17	5,488	2	1,420	1	11,878	7	50	0	640	0	355	0			19,831	10	1,597	21,428	48,477	44.20%	TNA
315	Velanai	DC	JAF	NO	2011-07-23	3,973	8	39	0	2,221	3									6,233	11	714	6,947	12,028	57.76%	UPFA
316	Venkalacheddikulam	DC	VAV	NO	2011-03-17	2,295	2	118	0	3,587	5	64	0	5	0	1,587	2			7,656	9	412	8,068	18,925	42.63%	TNA
317	Vergul	DC	TRI	EA	2011-03-17	984	1	8	0	2,197	5	2	0	387	0			527	1	4,105	7	317	4,422	5,894	75.03%	TNA
318	Walallawita	DC	KAL	WE	2011-03-17	17,074	9	8,529	4			846	0					131	0	26,580	13	1,233	27,813	39,978	69.57%	UPFA
319	Walapane	DC	NUW	CE	2011-03-17	24,354	13	13,291	6			431	0	1,279	1			4,764	2	44,119	22	3,234	47,353	75,339	62.85%	UPFA
320	Warakapola	DC	KEG	SA	2011-07-23	38,302	16	13,182	5			1,393	1	925	0					53,802	22	2,859	56,661	85,333	66.40%	UPFA
321	Wariyapola	DC	KUR	NW	2011-03-17	31,004	15	14,292	6			1,286	0							46,582	21	2,663	49,245	72,405	68.01%	UPFA
322	Wattala	DC	GAM	WE	2011-03-17	30,195	11	24,344	7			1,512	1	17	0			412	0	56,480	19	1,922	58,402	88,346	66.11%	UPFA
323	Weeraketiya	DC	HAM	SO	2011-03-17	21,628	11	13,302	6			3,593	2	298	0			14	0	38,835	19	1,736	40,571	61,900	65.54%	UPFA
324	Weligama	DC	MTR	SO	2011-03-17	27,217	14	13,829	6			2,005	1	1,224	1			18	0	44,293	22	1,962	46,255	72,278	64.00%	UPFA
325	Weligepola	DC	RAT	SA	2011-07-23	20,593	8					690	0	2,082	1					23,365	9	2,198	25,563	42,961	59.50%	UPFA
326	Welikanda	DC	POL	NC	2011-07-23	12,961	8					375	0			1,356	1			14,692	9	1,339	16,031	22,529	71.16%	UPFA
327	Welimada	DC	BAD	UV	2011-03-17	20,801	11	17,007	7			1,355	1	1,114	1	2,837	1	911	0	44,025	21	2,311	46,336	70,022	66.17%	UPFA
328	Welivitiya-Divitura	DC	GAL	SO	2011-03-17	7,338	5	6,166	3			367	0	1,056	0			10	0	14,937	8	657	15,594	21,772	71.62%	UPFA
329	Wellawaya	DC	MON	UV	2011-03-17	15,073	7	10,060	3			542	0					91	0	25,766	10	1,389	27,155	40,564	66.94%	UPFA
330	Wennappuwa	DC	PUT	NW	2011-07-23	35,083	16	15,936	6			700	0	46	0					51,765	22	2,305	54,070	101,683	53.18%	UPFA
331	Wilgamuwa	DC	MTL	CE	2011-07-23	5,792	5	3,741	2					4,616	2					14,149	9	832	14,981	21,511	69.64%	UPFA
332	Yakkalamulla	DC	GAL	SO	2011-03-17	14,410	7	7,403	3			1,133	0	115	0			14	0	23,075	10	1,002	24,077	32,741	73.54%	UPFA
333	Yatawatta	DC	MTL	CE	2011-03-17	7,928	6	5,667	3			316	0	42	0					13,953	9	939	14,892	22,944	64.91%	UPFA
334	Yatinuwara	DC	KAN	CE	2011-07-23	27,921	15	12,347	6			747	0	30	0	1,310	1			42,355	22	2,158	44,513	68,855	64.65%	UPFA
335	Yatiyantota	DC	KEG	SA	2011-03-17	17,372	10	9,905	5			340	0	555	0			2	0	28,174	15	1,580	29,754	43,876	67.81%	UPFA
	Total					4,821,203	2,611	2,710,222	1,157	255,078	275	242,502	74	219,998	77	140,727	72	151,362	61	8,541,092	4,327	405,279	8,946,371	13,653,524	65.52%	
