= Chavakachcheri Divisional Council =

Local authority in Sri Lanka

Chavakachcheri Divisional Council சாவகச்சேரி பிரதேச சபை

Type
- Type: Local authority

Leadership
- Chairman: Sittampalam Thurairajah, TNA since July 2011
- Deputy Chairman: Kanapathipillai Yogarasa, TNA since July 2011
- Seats: 15

Elections
- Last election: 2011 Sri Lankan local government elections

Chavakachcheri Divisional Council (Tamil: சாவகச்சேரி பிரதேச சபை Cāvakaccēri Piratēca Capai; CDC) is the local authority for Thenmarachchi DS Division in northern Sri Lanka, except for the town of Chavakachcheri which has its own local authority. CDC is responsible for providing a variety of local public services including roads, sanitation, drains, housing, libraries, public parks and recreational facilities. It has 15 members elected using the open list proportional representation system. CDC is sometimes called Thenmarachchi Divisional Council.

== History ==
In 1987 there was a major re-organisation of local government in Sri Lanka. District Development Councils were abolished and replaced by Divisional Councils (Pradeshiya Sabha or Pradesha Sabhai). The Pradeshiya Sabha Act No. 15 of 1987 was passed by Parliament on 15 April 1987 and on 1 January 1988 257 Divisional Councils started functioning. The Divisional Councils were generally commensurate with their namesake Divisional Secretary's Divisions. Chavakachcheri Divisional Council was established as the local authority for the Thenmarachchi DS Division, except for the town of Chavakachcheri which had its own local authority. However, according to the pro-LTTE TamilNet, the Sri Lankan government had suspended all local government in the north and east of the country in 1983 using emergency regulations. The civil war prevented elections from being held for CDC until 1998 as the LTTE did not hold elections when it controlled the area.

In March 1994 elections were held in the east and in Vavuniya in the north. However, elections weren't held in other areas of the north, including the Jaffna Peninsula, because most of these areas were at that time controlled by the rebel Tamil Tigers. In August 1995 the Sri Lankan military launched an offensive to recapture the Jaffna Peninsula. By December 1995 the military had captured most of the Valikamam region of the peninsula, including the city of Jaffna. By 16 May 1996 the military had recaptured the entire peninsula. In late 1996 the government announced elections would be held for 23 local authorities in Jaffna District, Kilinochchi District, Mannar District and Vavuniya District but following opposition from Tamil political parties postponed them. On 3 December 1997 the government announced that elections would be held for the 17 local authorities on the Jaffna Peninsula. The Tamil political parties were still opposed to holding elections as "normalcy" hadn't returned to the peninsula. The peninsula was under the firm grip of the Sri Lankan military and civil government had little, if any, role in the administration of the peninsula. The Tamil Tigers were also firmly against the elections being held. Despite these objections the elections were held on 29 January 1998.

== Election results ==
=== 1998 local government election ===
Results of the local government election held on 29 January 1998:

Alliances and parties	Votes	%	Seats
Democratic People's Liberation Front (PLOTE)	3,460	36.82%	7
Eelam People's Democratic Party	3,103	33.02%	4
Eelam People's Revolutionary Liberation Front	2,091	22.25%	3
Tamil Eelam Liberation Organization	742	7.90%	1
Valid Votes	9,396	100.00%	15
Rejected Votes	2,504		
Total Polled	11,900		
Registered Electors	39,871		
Turnout	29.85%		

On 1 January 2002 local authority elections were called for the entire country. It was later announced that elections would be held on 25 March 2002 in the north and east, and on 20 March 2002 in the rest of the country. The normal life term of Sri Lankan local government bodies is four years. The life term of CDC expired in February 2002 but the central government extended this by another year, as the law allows. On 21 March 2002 the Election Commissioner announced that the elections in the north and east, except for eight local authorities in Ampara District, had been postponed until 25 September 2002. On 17 September 2002 elections in the north and east were postponed, for a second time, until 25 June 2003. Elections should have been held when the extension expired in February 2003 but in January 2003, following a request from the Tamil National Alliance, the central government instead dissolved CDC using emergency powers and instead put in place special commissioners to administer the local area. In June 2003 elections in the north and east were postponed, for a third time, until 24 January 2004. In January 2004 elections in the north and east, except for local authorities in Ampara District, were postponed, for a fourth time, until 23 October 2004.

On 27 January 2006 local authority elections were called for the entire country. It was later announced that elections would be held on 30 March 2006 across the entire country. The Election Commissioner subsequently postponed the elections in the north and Batticaloa District until 30 September 2006. On 23 September 2006 elections in the north and Batticaloa District were postponed until 30 June 2007.

CDC continued to be administered by special commissioners until the 2011 elections.

=== 2011 local government election ===
Results of the local government election held on 23 July 2011:

Alliances and parties	Votes	%	Seats
Tamil National Alliance (EPRLF (S), ITAK, PLOTE, TELO, TULF)	12,565	75.07%	12
United People's Freedom Alliance (EPDP, SLFP et al.)	3,161	18.89%	2
United National Party	667	3.98%	1
Independent 1	246	1.47%	0
Independent 2	97	0.58%	0
Janatha Vimukthi Peramuna	2	0.01%	0
Valid Votes	16,738	100.00%	15
Rejected Votes	1,494		
Total Polled	18,232		
Registered Electors	37,015		
Turnout	49.26%		

The following candidates were elected: Sittampalam Thurairajah (TNA), 6,520 preference votes (pv); Kanapathipillai Yogarasa (TNA), 2,019 pv; Jekarathnam Sitsabanathan (TNA), 1,682 pv; Sinnapodian Ratnasingam (TNA), 1,671 pv; Kanthasamy Piratheepan (TNA), 1,613 pv; Velan Kanthaiah (TNA), 1,611 pv; Rasaiah Theiventhirampillai (TNA), 1,521 pv; Kanthaiah Asokalingam (TNA), 1,349 pv; Sankaran Thankarasa (TNA), 1,327 pv; Rajenthiram Yanaki (TNA), 1,212 pv; Vijayaratnam Edwin Danial (TNA), 1,131 pv; Rasaiah Matheeswaran (TNA), 1,090 pv; Kumaru Sarvananthan (UNP), 941 pv; Alagaiya Dias Emmanuel (UPFA), 712 pv; and Sathasivam Gnanalingam (UPFA), 682 pv.

Sittampalam Thurairajah (TNA) and Kanapathipillai Yogarasa (TNA) were appointed chairman and deputy chairman respectively.

== Controversy ==
In October 2013, the Chavakachcheri Pradeshiya Sabha passed a resolution calling for the reconstruction of LTTE cemeteries in the area, coming under the purview of the newly elected Northern Provincial Council. The Illankai Tamil Arasu Kadchi (ITAK) run PS also decided to commemorate those who died fighting for the LTTE.
