= 1998 Sri Lankan local elections =

- 29 January 1998

233 seats across 17 local authorities
- Turnout: 18.63%
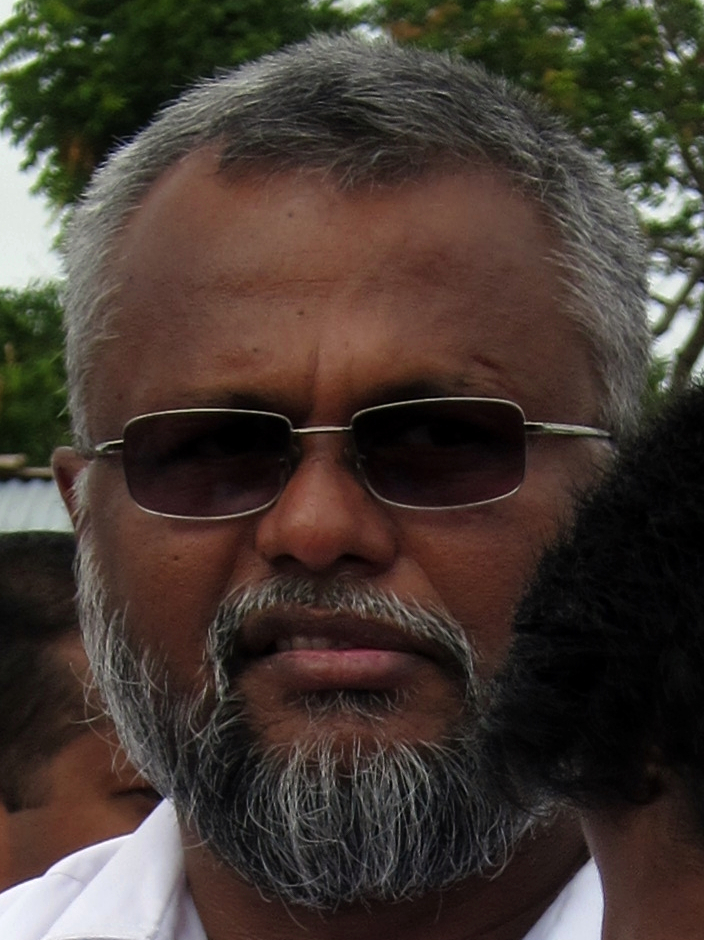

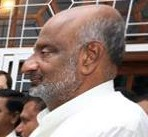

	First party	Second party	Third party
			EPRLF
Leader	Douglas Devananda	Dharmalingam Siddarthan	Varatharajah Perumal
Party	EPDP	DPLF	EPRLF
Popular vote	38,726	25,576	13,140
Percentage	42.28%	27.92%	14.35%
Councillors	105	62	25
Local Authorities	9	3	0
	Fourth party	Fifth party
	TULF
Leader	M. Sivasithamparam	Selvam Adaikalanathan
Party	TULF	TELO
Popular vote	6,361	6,874
Percentage	6.94%	7.50%
Councillors	20	18
Local Authorities	1	1

Local government elections were held in Sri Lanka on 29 January 1998 for 17 local authorities on the Jaffna Peninsula, in the north of the country. They were the first local elections held in the peninsula since 1983. Turnout was low due to the threats issued by the rebel Tamil Tigers. The Eelam People's Democratic Party gained control of nine local authorities, Democratic People's Liberation Front (PLOTE) three, Tamil United Liberation Front one and Tamil Eelam Liberation Organization one. There was no overall control in the three remaining local authorities.

== Background ==
The Sri Lankan government suspended local government in the north and east of the country in 1983 using Emergency Regulations. In March 1994, elections were held in the east and in Vavuniya in the north. However, elections weren't held in other areas of the north, including the Jaffna peninsula, because most of these areas were at that time controlled by the rebel Tamil Tigers.

In August 1995 the Sri Lankan Military launched an offensive to recapture the Jaffna Peninsula. By December 1995 the military had captured most of the Valikamam region of the peninsula, including the city of Jaffna. By 16 May 1996 the military had recaptured the entire peninsula. In late 1996 the government announced elections would be held for 23 local authorities in Jaffna District, Kilinochchi District, Mannar District and Vavuniya District but following opposition from Tamil political parties postponed them. On 3 December 1997 the government announced that elections would be held for the 17 local authorities on the Jaffna Peninsula. The Tamil political parties were still opposed to holding elections as "normalcy" hadn't returned to the peninsula. The peninsula was under the firm grip of the Sri Lankan military and civil government had little, if any, role in the administration of the peninsula. The Tamil Tigers were also firmly against the elections being held. Despite these objections the elections were held on 29 January 1998.

== Details ==
The Tamil Tigers ordered the electors not to participate in the elections and issued threats against election officials and potential candidates. As a result, most moderate political parties did not participate in the elections. The two main national parties, People's Alliance and United National Party, didn't contest in any of the local authorities. The Tamil United Liberation Front, the largest moderate Tamil party, only contested in two of the 17 local authorities. This allowed the elections to be dominated by government backed paramilitary groups and rebel militant groups. The Democratic People's Liberation Front (PLOTE), Eelam People's Democratic Party, Eelam People's Revolutionary Liberation Front and Tamil Eelam Liberation Organization contested in all 17 local authorities. A breakaway faction of the EPDP contested in two local authorities as an independent group.

Five of the nominations of the EPRLF and both nominations of the TULF were initially rejected due to technical errors but legal challenges overturned the rejections.

== Results ==
Turnout was low (19%) due to the threats issued by the Tamil Tigers. 14% of the votes cast were also spoilt. The EPDP gained control of nine local authorities, DPLF (PLOTE) three, TULF one and TELO one. There was no overall control in the three remaining local authorities, including Jaffna Municipal Council.

=== Overall ===
Party	Votes	%	Seats	LA's
Eelam People's Democratic Party	38,726	42.28%	105	9
Democratic People's Liberation Front (PLOTE)	25,576	27.92%	62	3
Eelam People's Revolutionary Liberation Front	13,140	14.35%	25	0
Tamil United Liberation Front	6,361	6.94%	20	1
Tamil Eelam Liberation Organization	6,874	7.50%	18	1
Independent (EPDP)	919	1.00%	3	0
No overall control				3
Valid Votes	91,596	100.00%	233	17
Rejected Votes	14,868			
Total Polled	106,464			
Registered Electors	571,486			
Turnout	18.63%			

=== By local authority ===
Local Authority	Type^{1}	Admin District	EPDP Votes	EPDP Seats	DPLF (PLOTE) Votes	DPLF (PLOTE) Seats	EPRLF Votes	EPRLF Seats	TELO Votes	TELO Seats	TULF Votes	TULF Seats	Ind (EPDP) Votes	Ind (EPDP) Seats	Total Votes	Total Seats	Reje- cted Votes	Total Polled	Regis- tered Electors	Turnout %
Chavakachcheri	DC	JAF	3,103	4	3,460	7	2,091	3	742	1					9,396	15	2,504	11,900	39,871	29.85%
Chavakachcheri	UC	JAF	680	2	1,146	6	835	3	99	0					2,760	11	527	3,287	14,802	22.21%
Delft	DC	JAF	1,484	8	293	1	13	0	10	0					1,800	9	125	1,925	4,209	45.74%
Jaffna	MC	JAF	2,963	6	3,182	6	943	2			3,540	9			10,628	23	907	11,535	82,667	13.95%
Kayts	DC	JAF	2,771	9	536	1	51	0	57	0			411	1	3,826	11	269	4,095	30,340	13.50%
Nallur	DC	JAF	2,064	7	921	2	847	2	417	1					4,249	12	554	4,803	32,814	14.64%
Pachchilaippallai	DC	KIL	377	2	731	5	362	2	114	0					1,584	9	385	1,969	7,463	26.38%
Point Pedro	DC	JAF	2,208	5	859	1	1,459	2	549	1					5,075	9	1,177	6,252	29,929	20.89%
Point Pedro	UC	JAF	656	2	1,301	6	122	0	157	1					2,236	9	374	2,610	12,721	20.52%
Vadamarachchi South West	DC	JAF	3,888	9	2,940	6	554	0	1,236	2					8,618	17	1,868	10,486	45,214	23.19%
Valikamam East	DC	JAF	3,978	9	2,975	5	2,909	5	752	2					10,614	21	1,711	12,325	54,386	22.66%
Valikamam North	DC	JAF	1,799	6	528	2	816	2	144	0	2,821	11			6,108	21	469	6,577	53,697	12.25%
Valikamam South	DC	JAF	3,542	8	2,659	5	1,121	2	496	1					7,818	16	939	8,757	41,444	21.13%
Valikamam South West	DC	JAF	4,069	10	1,281	3	578	1	815	2					6,743	16	1,213	7,956	41,856	19.01%
Valikamam West	DC	JAF	3,146	8	2,358	4	327	1	494	1					6,325	14	1,307	7,632	37,746	20.22%
Valvettithurai	UC	JAF	283	2	151	1	54	0	736	6					1,224	9	255	1,479	11,128	13.29%
Velanai	DC	JAF	1,715	8	255	1	58	0	56	0			508	2	2,592	11	284	2,876	31,199	9.22%
Total			38,726	105	25,576	62	13,140	25	6,874	18	6,361	20	919	3	91,596	233	14,868	106,464	571,486	18.63%

1. DC = Rural Council (Pradeshiya Sabha or Pradesha Sabhai), MC = Municipal Council, UC = Urban Council

== Aftermath ==
The normal life term of Sri Lankan local government bodies is four years. The life term of the above 17 local authorities expired in February 2002 but the central government extended this by another year, as the law allows. Elections should have been held when the extension expired in February 2003 but in January 2003, following a request from the Tamil National Alliance, the central government instead dissolved the local authorities and instead put in place special commissions to administer the local areas.

The Jaffna peninsula continued to be administered by these special commissions until elections were held on 8 August 2009 for Jaffna Municipal Council. Elections for the rest of the peninsula are due to take place on 17 March 2011.
