= Nallur Divisional Council =

Local authority for Nallur DS Division, Sri Lanka

Nallur Divisional Council நல்லூர் பிரதேச சபை

Type
- Type: Local authority

Leadership
- Chairman: Paramalingam Vasanthakumar, TNA since July 2011
- Deputy Chairman: Komathi Ravithas, TNA since July 2011
- Seats: 12

Elections
- Last election: 2011 Sri Lankan local government elections

Website
- nallur.ps.gov.lk

Nallur Divisional Council (Tamil: நல்லூர் பிரதேச சபை Nallūr Piratēca Capai; NDC) is the local authority for Nallur DS Division in northern Sri Lanka, except for 19 GN Divisions which are part of Jaffna Municipal Council. NDC is responsible for providing a variety of local public services including roads, sanitation, drains, housing, libraries, public parks and recreational facilities. It has 12 members elected using the open list proportional representation system.

== History ==
In 1987 there was a major re-organisation of local government in Sri Lanka. District Development Councils were abolished and replaced by Divisional Councils (Pradeshiya Sabha or Pradesha Sabhai). The Pradeshiya Sabha Act No. 15 of 1987 was passed by Parliament on 15 April 1987 and on 1 January 1988 257 Divisional Councils started functioning. The Divisional Councils were generally commensurate with their namesake Divisional Secretary's Divisions. Nallur Divisional Council was established as the local authority for the Nallur DS Division, except for 19 GN Divisions which were part of Jaffna Municipal Council. However, according to the pro-LTTE TamilNet, the Sri Lankan government had suspended all local government in the north and east of the country in 1983 using emergency regulations. The civil war prevented elections from being held for NDC until 1998 as the LTTE did not hold when it controlled the area.

In March 1994 elections were held in the east and in Vavuniya in the north. However, elections weren't held in other areas of the north, including the Jaffna Peninsula, because most of these areas were at that time controlled by the rebel Tamil Tigers. In August 1995 the Sri Lankan military launched an offensive to recapture the Jaffna Peninsula. By December 1995 the military had captured most of the Valikamam region of the peninsula, including the city of Jaffna. By 16 May 1996 the military had recaptured the entire peninsula. In late 1996 the government announced elections would be held for 23 local authorities in Jaffna District, Kilinochchi District, Mannar District and Vavuniya District but following opposition from Tamil political parties postponed them. On 3 December 1997 the government announced that elections would be held for the 17 local authorities on the Jaffna Peninsula. The Tamil political parties were still opposed to holding elections as "normalcy" hadn't returned to the peninsula. The peninsula was under the firm grip of the Sri Lankan military and civil government had little, if any, role in the administration of the peninsula. The Tamil Tigers were also firmly against the elections being held. Despite these objections the elections were held on 29 January 1998.

== Election results ==
=== 1998 local government election ===
Results of the local government election held on 29 January 1998:

Alliances and parties	Votes	%	Seats
Eelam People's Democratic Party	2,064	48.58%	7
Democratic People's Liberation Front (PLOTE)	921	21.68%	2
Eelam People's Revolutionary Liberation Front	847	19.93%	2
Tamil Eelam Liberation Organization	417	9.81%	1
Valid Votes	4,249	100.00%	12
Rejected Votes	554		
Total Polled	4,803		
Registered Electors	32,814		
Turnout	14.64%		

On 1 January 2002 local authority elections were called for the entire country. It was later announced that elections would be held on 25 March 2002 in the north and east, and on 20 March 2002 in the rest of the country. The normal life term of Sri Lankan local government bodies is four years. The life term of NDC expired in February 2002 but the central government extended this by another year, as the law allows. On 21 March 2002 the Election Commissioner announced that the elections in the north and east, except for eight local authorities in Ampara District, had been postponed until 25 September 2002. On 17 September 2002 elections in the north and east were postponed, for a second time, until 25 June 2003. Elections should have been held when the extension expired in February 2003 but in January 2003, following a request from the Tamil National Alliance, the central government instead dissolved NDC using emergency powers and instead put in place special commissioners to administer the local area. In June 2003 elections in the north and east were postponed, for a third time, until 24 January 2004. In January 2004 elections in the north and east, except for local authorities in Ampara District, were postponed, for a fourth time, until 23 October 2004.

On 27 January 2006 local authority elections were called for the entire country. It was later announced that elections would be held on 30 March 2006 across the entire country. The Election Commissioner subsequently postponed the elections in the north and Batticaloa District until 30 September 2006. On 23 September 2006 elections in the north and Batticaloa District were postponed until 30 June 2007.

NDC continued to be administered by special commissioners until the 2011 elections.

=== 2011 local government election ===
Results of the local government election held on 23 July 2011:

Alliances and parties	Votes	%	Seats
Tamil National Alliance (EPRLF (S), ITAK, PLOTE, TELO, TULF)	10,207	81.33%	10
United People's Freedom Alliance (EPDP, SLFP et al.)	2,238	17.83%	2
United National Party	105	0.84%	0
Valid Votes	12,550	100.00%	12
Rejected Votes	707		
Total Polled	13,257		
Registered Electors	22,012		
Turnout	60.23%		

The following candidates were elected: Paramalingam Vasanthakumar (TNA), 3,483 preference votes (pv); Komathi Ravithas (TNA), 2,910 pv; Periyathampy Kanagasabapathipillai (TNA), 2,759 pv; Rasaiya Rasalingam (TNA), 2,689 pv; Kidnar Tharmaratnam (TNA), 2,241 pv; Thamotharampillai Thiyagamoorthi (TNA), 2,016 pv; Nagan Sivaloganathan (TNA), 1,792 pv; Thambimuthu Thuraimani (TNA), 1,322 pv; Sivarasa Kajenthiran (TNA), 1,124 pv; Sanmugalingam Sureskumar (TNA), 1,052 pv; Ambalam Raveenthirathasan (UPFA), 950 pv; and Vallipuram Sriganesha (UPFA), 575 pv.

Paramalingam Vasanthakumar (TNA) and Komathi Ravithas (TNA) were appointed chairman and deputy chairman respectively.
