= Point Pedro Urban Council =

Local authority in Sri Lanka

Point Pedro Urban Council பருத்தித்துறை நகர சபை

Type
- Type: Local authority

Leadership
- Chairman: Sabanayagam Raveenthiran, TNA since July 2011
- Deputy Chairman: Sithamparappillai Pathmanathan, TNA since July 2011
- Seats: 9

Elections
- Last election: 2011 Sri Lankan local government elections

Point Pedro Urban Council (Tamil: பருத்தித்துறை நகர சபை Paruttittuṟai Nakara Capai; PPUC) is the local authority for the town of Point Pedro in northern Sri Lanka. PPUC is responsible for providing a variety of local public services including roads, sanitation, drains, housing, libraries, public parks and recreational facilities. It has 9 members elected using the open list proportional representation system.

== Election results ==
=== 1983 local government election ===
Results of the local government election held on 18 May 1983:

Alliances and parties	Votes	%	Seats
Tamil United Liberation Front	82	71.30%	7
United National Party	27	23.48%	2
Independent	5	4.35%	0
Nava Sama Samaja Party	1	0.87%	0
Valid Votes	115	100.00%	9
Rejected Votes	0		
Total Polled	115		
Registered Electors	10,928		
Turnout	1.05%		

According to the pro-LTTE TamilNet, the Sri Lankan government had suspended all local government in the north and east of the country in 1983 using emergency regulations. The civil war prevented elections from being held for PPUC until 1998 as the LTTE did not hold when it controlled the area.

In March 1994 elections were held in the east and in Vavuniya in the north. However, elections weren't held in other areas of the north, including the Jaffna Peninsula, because most of these areas were at that time controlled by the rebel Tamil Tigers. In August 1995 the Sri Lankan military launched an offensive to recapture the Jaffna Peninsula. By December 1995 the military had captured most of the Valikamam region of the peninsula, including the city of Jaffna. By 16 May 1996 the military had recaptured the entire peninsula. In late 1996 the government announced elections would be held for 23 local authorities in Jaffna District, Kilinochchi District, Mannar District and Vavuniya District but following opposition from Tamil political parties postponed them. On 3 December 1997 the government announced that elections would be held for the 17 local authorities on the Jaffna Peninsula. The Tamil political parties were still opposed to holding elections as "normalcy" hadn't returned to the peninsula. The peninsula was under the firm grip of the Sri Lankan military and civil government had little, if any, role in the administration of the peninsula. The Tamil Tigers were also firmly against the elections being held. Despite these objections the elections were held on 29 January 1998.

=== 1998 local government election ===
Results of the local government election held on 29 January 1998:

Alliances and parties	Votes	%	Seats
Democratic People's Liberation Front (PLOTE)	1,301	58.18%	6
Eelam People's Democratic Party	656	29.34%	2
Tamil Eelam Liberation Organization	157	7.02%	1
Eelam People's Revolutionary Liberation Front	122	5.46%	0
Valid Votes	2,236	100.00%	9
Rejected Votes	374		
Total Polled	2,610		
Registered Electors	12,721		
Turnout	20.52%		

On 1 January 2002 local authority elections were called for the entire country. It was later announced that elections would be held on 25 March 2002 in the north and east, and on 20 March 2002 in the rest of the country. The normal life term of Sri Lankan local government bodies is four years. The life term of PPUC expired in February 2002 but the central government extended this by another year, as the law allows. On 21 March 2002 the Election Commissioner announced that the elections in the north and east, except for eight local authorities in Ampara District, had been postponed until 25 September 2002. On 17 September 2002 elections in the north and east were postponed, for a second time, until 25 June 2003. Elections should have been held when the extension expired in February 2003 but in January 2003, following a request from the Tamil National Alliance, the central government instead dissolved PPUC using emergency powers and instead put in place special commissioners to administer the local area. In June 2003 elections in the north and east were postponed, for a third time, until 24 January 2004. In January 2004 elections in the north and east, except for local authorities in Ampara District, were postponed, for a fourth time, until 23 October 2004.

On 27 January 2006 local authority elections were called for the entire country. It was later announced that elections would be held on 30 March 2006 across the entire country. The Election Commissioner subsequently postponed the elections in the north and Batticaloa District until 30 September 2006. On 23 September 2006 elections in the north and Batticaloa District were postponed until 30 June 2007.

PPUC continued to be administered by special commissioners until the 2011 elections.

=== 2011 local government election ===
Results of the local government election held on 23 July 2011:

Alliances and parties	Votes	%	Seats
Tamil National Alliance (ITAK, EPRLF (S), TELO, PLOTE, TULF)	3,263	72.62%	7
United People's Freedom Alliance (EPDP, SLFP et al.)	1,107	24.64%	2
United National Party	115	2.56%	0
Independent	7	0.16%	0
Janatha Vimukthi Peramuna	1	0.02%	0
Valid Votes	4,493	100.00%	9
Rejected Votes	270		
Total Polled	4,763		
Registered Electors	7,376		
Turnout	64.57%		

The following candidates were elected: Sabanayagam Raveenthiran (TNA), 1,976 preference votes (pv); Sithamparappillai Pathmanathan (TNA), 1,477 pv; Nadarasa Niranjan (TNA), 1,390; Sivakumar Theepaananth (TNA), 798 pv; Mathani Nelson (TNA), 654 pv; Sivayoganathan Mugunthan (UPFA), 562 pv; Sivakolunthu Mahenthiran (UPFA), 511 pv; Arulampalam Arulmaathavan (TNA), 385 pv; and Ramasami Kulasegaram (TNA), 342 pv.

Sabanayagam Raveenthiran of TNA and Sithamparappillai Pathmanathan of TNA were appointed Chairman and Deputy Chairman respectively.
