= Chavakachcheri Urban Council =

Local authority in Sri Lanka

Chavakachcheri Urban Council சாவகச்சேரி நகர சபை

Type
- Type: Local authority

Leadership
- Chairman: Rapiyel Thevasagayampillai, TNA since July 2011
- Deputy Chairman: Kumarasamy Sathasivamoorthy, TNA since July 2011
- Seats: 11

Elections
- Last election: 2011 Sri Lankan local government elections

Chavakachcheri Urban Council (Tamil: சாவகச்சேரி நகர சபை Cāvakaccēri Nakara Capai; CUC) is the local authority for the town of Chavakachcheri in northern Sri Lanka. CUC is responsible for providing a variety of local public services including roads, sanitation, drains, housing, libraries, public parks and recreational facilities. It has 11 members elected using the open list proportional representation system.

== Election results ==
=== 1983 local government election ===
Results of the local government election held on 18 May 1983:

Alliances and parties	Votes	%	Seats
Tamil United Liberation Front	1,718	92.12%	11
All Ceylon Tamil Congress	109	5.84%	0
United National Party	38	2.04%	0
Valid Votes	1,865	100.00%	11
Rejected Votes	20		
Total Polled	1,885		
Registered Electors	12,050		
Turnout	15.64%		

According to the pro-LTTE TamilNet, the Sri Lankan government had suspended all local government in the north and east of the country in 1983 using emergency regulations. The civil war prevented elections from being held for CUC until 1998 as the LTTE did not hold elections when it controlled the area.

In March 1994 elections were held in the east and in Vavuniya in the north. However, elections weren't held in other areas of the north, including the Jaffna Peninsula, because most of these areas were at that time controlled by the rebel Tamil Tigers. In August 1995 the Sri Lankan military launched an offensive to recapture the Jaffna Peninsula. By December 1995 the military had captured most of the Valikamam region of the peninsula, including the city of Jaffna. By 16 May 1996 the military had recaptured the entire peninsula. In late 1996 the government announced elections would be held for 23 local authorities in Jaffna District, Kilinochchi District, Mannar District and Vavuniya District but following opposition from Tamil political parties postponed them. On 3 December 1997 the government announced that elections would be held for the 17 local authorities on the Jaffna Peninsula. The Tamil political parties were still opposed to holding elections as "normalcy" hadn't returned to the peninsula. The peninsula was under the firm grip of the Sri Lankan military and civil government had little, if any, role in the administration of the peninsula. The Tamil Tigers were also firmly against the elections being held. Despite these objections the elections were held on 29 January 1998.

=== 1998 local government election ===
Results of the local government election held on 29 January 1998:

Alliances and parties	Votes	%	Seats
Democratic People's Liberation Front (PLOTE)	1,146	41.52%	6
Eelam People's Revolutionary Liberation Front	835	30.25%	3
Eelam People's Democratic Party	680	24.64%	2
Tamil Eelam Liberation Organization	99	3.59%	0
Valid Votes	2,760	100.00%	11
Rejected Votes	527		
Total Polled	3,287		
Registered Electors	14,802		
Turnout	22.21%		

On 1 January 2002 local authority elections were called for the entire country. It was later announced that elections would be held on 25 March 2002 in the north and east, and on 20 March 2002 in the rest of the country. The normal life term of Sri Lankan local government bodies is four years. The life term of CUC expired in February 2002 but the central government extended this by another year, as the law allows. On 21 March 2002 the Election Commissioner announced that the elections in the north and east, except for eight local authorities in Ampara District, had been postponed until 25 September 2002. On 17 September 2002 elections in the north and east were postponed, for a second time, until 25 June 2003. Elections should have been held when the extension expired in February 2003 but in January 2003, following a request from the Tamil National Alliance, the central government instead dissolved CUC using emergency powers and instead put in place special commissioners to administer the local area. In June 2003 elections in the north and east were postponed, for a third time, until 24 January 2004. In January 2004 elections in the north and east, except for local authorities in Ampara District, were postponed, for a fourth time, until 23 October 2004.

On 27 January 2006 local authority elections were called for the entire country. It was later announced that elections would be held on 30 March 2006 across the entire country. The Election Commissioner subsequently postponed the elections in the north and Batticaloa District until 30 September 2006. On 23 September 2006 elections in the north and Batticaloa District were postponed until 30 June 2007.

CUC continued to be administered by special commissioners until the 2011 elections.

=== 2011 local government election ===
Results of the local government election held on 23 July 2011:

Alliances and parties	Votes	%	Seats
Tamil National Alliance (ITAK, EPRLF (S), TELO, PLOTE, TULF)	4,307	76.84%	9
United People's Freedom Alliance (EPDP, SLFP et al.)	1,232	21.98%	2
United Socialist Party	38	0.68%	0
United National Party	28	0.50%	0
Valid Votes	5,605	100.00%	11
Rejected Votes	347		
Total Polled	5,952		
Registered Electors	10,987		
Turnout	54.17%		

The following candidates were elected: Rapiyel Thevasagayampillai (TNA), 1,807 preference votes (pv); Kumarasamy Sathasivamoorthy (TNA), 1,311 pv; Kandiah Mylvaganam (TNA), 1,104 pv; Arunachalam Balamayuran (TNA), 1,103 pv; Kasilingam Satkunadevan (TNA), 964 pv; Ponnuthurai Selvaratnam (TNA), 763 pv; Gnanapirakasam Kishor (TNA), 749 pv; Paramasami Sritharan (TNA), 690 pv; Soosaimuthu Alexander (UPFA), 540 pv; Thanapalasingam Sutharshan (TNA), 454 pv; and Nadarasa Thirukumaran (UPFA), 425 pv.

Rapiyel Thevasagayampillai (TNA) and Kumarasamy Sathasivamoorthy (TNA) were appointed chairman and deputy chairman respectively.
