= Chavakachcheri =

Chavakachcheri சாவகச்சேரி චාවකච්චේරි
- Town
- Location within Northern Province
- Coordinates: 9°39′0″N 80°09′0″E
- Country: Sri Lanka
- Province: Northern
- District: Jaffna
- Divisional Secretariat: Thenmaradchi

Government
  - Type: Chavakachcheri Urban Council

Area
  - Total: 19.4 km^{2} (7.5 sq mi)

Population (2012)
  - Total: 16,129
- Time zone: UTC+5:30 (Sri Lanka Standard Time Zone)

Chavakachcheri (Note: Tamil: சாவகச்சேரி, romanized: Cāvakaccēri; Sinhala: ජාවකච්චේරි, romanized: Jāvakachchēri) is a town in Jaffna District, Northern Province, Sri Lanka. It is the administrative centre of the Thenmaradchi Divisional Secretariat Division. The town is administered by the Chavakachcheri Urban Council. As of 2011, the town had a population of 16,129 inhabitants.

== History ==
Archeological evidence obtained in 2012 from the Varivaneswarar temple, a koil dedicated to Shiva, has been dated to the Chola dynasty between the 12th and 13th century. Javanese forces under the command of Chandrabhanu invaded northern Sri Lanka in the 13th century during the reign of King Vijayabahu IV. The name "Chavakachcheri" is associated with the expression "Cāvakar cēri" which referred to the settlement of Javanese people. "Cēri" is a Tamil word which refers to a town or settlement and "Cāvakar" is used to refer to the people from Java, which is referred to as "Cāvakam" in Tamil literature.

The Chavakachcheri Hindu College was established in 1907. The region faced severe destruction and exodus of the population during the Srilankan Civil War in the late 20th century.

== Geography and administration ==
Chavakachcheri is situated in the Thenmaradchi Divisional Secretariat Division, located in the southern part of the Jaffna Peninsula in Jaffna District, Northern Province, Sri Lanka. It is the administrative centre of the Thenmaradchi Divisional Secretariat Division. The town covers an urban area of 19.4 km^{2} (7.5 sq mi). The town is administered by the Chavakachcheri Urban Council, which is one of the two local bodies in division. The town is divided into 11 wards each of which elects a single member to the council.

== Demographics ==
As per the 2012 census, the division had a population of 64,704 inhabitants comprising 30,483 males and 34,221 females. The Chavakachcheri urban area had a population of 16,129.

== Transport ==
Chavakachcheri is part of the A9 road connecting Kandy and Jaffna. It is also connected by road to Poonakary and Point Pedro. The town is served by the Chavakachcheri railway station on the Northern railway line.
