= People's Liberation Organisation of Tamil Eelam =

People's Liberation Organisation of Tamil Eelam தமிழீழ மக்கள் விடுதலைக் கழகம்
- Leader: D. Siddarthan
- Founder: Uma Maheswaran
- Founded: 1980; 46 years ago
- Split from: Liberation Tigers of Tamil Eelam
- Headquarters: 16 Haig Road, Bambalapiya, Colombo 4
- Electoral wing: Democratic People's Liberation Front
- Ideology: Tamil nationalism
- National affiliation: Democratic Tamil National Alliance
- Parliament: 0 / 225

Election symbol
- Anchor

Party flag

Website
- plote.org

The People's Liberation Organisation of Tamil Eelam (PLOTE) is a former Tamil militant group that had become a pro-government paramilitary group and political party. PLOTE's political wing is known as the Democratic People's Liberation Front.

== Origins ==
PLOTE was founded in 1980 by an ex-surveyor Uma Maheswaran alias Mukundan, who became its general secretary. He was the chairman of the Liberation Tigers of Tamil Eelam (Tamil Tigers or LTTE) from 1977 to 1980. He was trained in Lebanon and later in Syria under the Palestinian nationalist organization Popular Front for the Liberation of Palestine. After a bitter rivalry with Velupillai Prabhakaran, Uma Maheswaran left the LTTE in 1980 and formed PLOTE.

== Coup in Maldives ==
In late 1988, an attempted coup to overthrow the Maumoon Abdul Gayoom's government in Maldives with the help of mercenaries from PLOTE was foiled with assistance from the Indian Army and Navy.

There have been suggestions that the PLOTE may have been promised one of the small Maldivian islands as a base, possibly for arms shipments. In a 2018 interview, Vetrichelvan PLOTE's former representative in New Delhi claims it was Athulathmudali, then Sri Lankan Prime Minister, who instigated PLOTE into such a venture on a promise of some islands.

== Conflict with LTTE ==
On May 19, 1982, a shootout occurred at about 9:45 p.m. at Pondy Bazaar, Mambalam, Madras between LTTE and PLOTE members. V. Prabhakaran and Raghavan (alias Sivakumar) of the LTTE, armed with revolvers, opened fire on Jotheeswaran and Mukundan (alias Uma Maheswaran) of the PLOTE. In the mid-1970s, both Prabhakaran and Uma Maheswaran were members of the LTTE. During the gunfire, Jotheeswaran sustained bullet injuries both in his right and left thighs. Mukundan was also shot at but escaped unhurt. The accused V. Prabhakaran and Sivakumar were arrested and remanded. Both of them were proclaimed offenders of the Sri Lankan government with a reward on their head of Rs. 5 lakhs each.

On May 25, 1982, Uma Maheswaran was arrested near Gummidipoondi railway station. At the time of arrest, he opened fire with his revolver and another case was registered against him under the Indian Arms Act.

In the meantime, on May 23, 1982 Sivaneswaran (alias Niranjan), an accomplice of Mukundan, was also arrested at Saidapet, Madras and an unlicensed revolver seized from him. All these accused remained in custody until August 5, 1982 when they were released by the orders of the court on conditional bail. The LTTE cadres including their leader V.Pirabhakaran had taken up residence at Mylapore Madras, while the leaders and members of the PLOTE had been staying at Saidapet, Madras.

== Demise of the organisation ==
PLOTE lost its strength and momentum gradually due to continual conflicts with the LTTE. On July 16, 1989, Uma Maheswaran was assassinated in Colombo. A PLOTE splinter group claimed responsibility, though many still suspect Indian intelligence agency (RAW) involvement.

== Current status ==
Currently it is functioning under the leadership of D. Siddarthan and is a pro-government minor political party that is alleged to cooperate with the Sri Lankan military against LTTE sympathizers. The group reportedly has around 1,500 permanent cadres in the north and east. In 2015 it was incorporated into the TNA.

=== Paramilitary activities ===
Some former members of the group also function along with the Sri Lankan Army as a para-military group in military activities against the LTTE. A prominent former PLOTE and later paramilitary leader Manika Dasan was killed by the LTTE in a claymore bomb attack in the town of Vavuniya.

Another paramilitary leader from the Batticlao region, Plote Mohan, was killed by LTTE assassins in Colombo in 2004.

Involvement in torture documented by Human Rights Watch in a number its reports including in 2008, 2009 2010

A letter to the Pope urged him to take up with the Sri Lankan government, the government's support of paramilitaries such as PLOTE.
