= Pradeshiya Sabha =

Administrative division in Sri Lanka

There are 276 Pradeshiya Sabhas in Sri Lanka, which are the legislative bodies that preside over the third tier municipalities in the country. Introduced in 1987 through the 13th Amendment to the Constitution of Sri Lanka, Pradeshiya Sabhas became a devolved subject under the Provincial Councils in the local government system of Sri Lanka. The Pradeshiya Sabhas collectively govern approximately 16,726,000 people. There are 3,624 councillors in total, ranging from 5 to 23 per council.

== Pradeshiya Sabhas ==
=== Western Province ===
Province	District		Pradeshiya Sabha		No. of Councillors	No. of Women Councillors	Area (km^{2}) (Note: 2012)	Population (2012)	Website
Western	1	Colombo	1	Homagama	23				https://www.homagama.ps.gov.lk/
Western	1	Colombo	2	Kotikawatta Mulleriyawa	21				
Western	1	Colombo	3	Seethawaka	22				http://seethawaka.ps.gov.lk/
Western	2	Gampaha	4	Attanagalla	23				http://attanagalla.ps.gov.lk/
Western	2	Gampaha	5	Biyagama	23				
Western	2	Gampaha	6	Divulapitiya	22				
Western	2	Gampaha	7	Dompe	22				http://dompe.ps.gov.lk/
Western	2	Gampaha	8	Gampaha	19				
Western	2	Gampaha	9	Ja-ela	22				
Western	2	Gampaha	10	Katana	22				http://katana.ps.gov.lk/
Western	2	Gampaha	11	Kelaniya	22				
Western	2	Gampaha	12	Mahara	23				
Western	2	Gampaha	13	Meerigama	23				
Western	2	Gampaha	14	Minuwangoda	23				
Western	2	Gampaha	15	Wattala	19				
Western	3	Kalutara	16	Agalawatta	11				
Western	3	Kalutara	17	Bandaragama	18				http://bandaragama.ps.gov.lk/
Western	3	Kalutara	18	Beruwela	22				
Western	3	Kalutara	19	Bulathsinhala	12				http://bulathsinghala.ps.gov.lk/
Western	3	Kalutara	20	Dodangoda	13				
Western	3	Kalutara	21	Horana	23				
Western	3	Kalutara	22	Kalutara	22				
Western	3	Kalutara	23	Madurawela	8				
Western	3	Kalutara	24	Matugama	18				
Western	3	Kalutara	25	Palindanuwara	14				
Western	3	Kalutara	26	Panadura	23				
Western	3	Kalutara	27	Walallawita	13				

=== North Western Province ===
Province	District		Pradeshiya Sabha		Municipality	Established/ Elevated	No. of Councillors	Chairman	Population (2024)	Website
North Western	4	Kurunegala	28	Alawwa	Alawwa		26		54,994	
North Western	4	Kurunegala	29	Bingiriya	Bingiriya		22		53,823	
North Western	4	Kurunegala	30	Galgamuwa	Galgamuwa		34		73,387	
North Western	4	Kurunegala	31	Giribawa	Giribawa		17		112,075	
North Western	4	Kurunegala	32	Ibbagamuwa	Ibbagamuwa		42		28,508	
North Western	4	Kurunegala	33	Kobeiagane	Kobeigane		17		31,696	
North Western	4	Kurunegala	34	Kuliyapitiya	Kuliyapitiya		46		108,829	
North Western	4	Kurunegala	35	Kurunegala						
North Western	4	Kurunegala	36	Mahawa						
North Western	4	Kurunegala	37	Mawathagama	Mawathagama		26		57,786	
North Western	4	Kurunegala	38	Narammala						
North Western	4	Kurunegala	39	Nikaweratiya						
North Western	4	Kurunegala	40	Panduwasnuwara						
North Western	4	Kurunegala	41	Pannala						
North Western	4	Kurunegala	42	Polgahawela	Polgahawela		41		86,727	
North Western	4	Kurunegala	43	Polpithigama	Polpithigama		30		69,278	
North Western	4	Kurunegala	44	Ridigama	Ridigama		39		79,035	
North Western	4	Kurunegala	45	Udubaddawa	Udubaddawa		19		45,579	
North Western	4	Kurunegala	46	Wariyapola	Wariyapola		39		86,516	
North Western	5	Puttalam	47	Anamaduwa						
North Western	5	Puttalam	48	Arachchikattuwa						
North Western	5	Puttalam	49	Chilaw						
North Western	5	Puttalam	50	Kalpitiya						
North Western	5	Puttalam	51	Karuwalagaswewa						
North Western	5	Puttalam	52	Nattandiya						
North Western	5	Puttalam	53	Nawagattegama						
North Western	5	Puttalam	54	Puttalam						
North Western	5	Puttalam	55	Wanathawilluwa						
North Western	5	Puttalam	56	Wennappuwa						

=== Central Province ===
Province	District		Pradeshiya Sabha		No. of Councillors	Area (km^{2}) (Note: 2012)	Population (2012)	Website
Central	6	Kandy	57	Akurana				
Central	6	Kandy	58	Ganga Ihala				
Central	6	Kandy	59	Harispattuwa				
Central	6	Kandy	60	Kandy Gravets & Gangawata Korale				
Central	6	Kandy	61	Kundasale				
Central	6	Kandy	62	Meda Dumbara				
Central	6	Kandy	63	Minipe		242	59628	https://www.minipe.ps.gov.lk/
Central	6	Kandy	64	Panwila				
Central	6	Kandy	65	Pasbage Korale				
Central	6	Kandy	66	Patadumbara				
Central	6	Kandy	67	Patahewaheta				
Central	6	Kandy	68	Pujapitiya				
Central	6	Kandy	69	Thumpane				
Central	6	Kandy	70	Uda Palatha				
Central	6	Kandy	71	Ududumbara				
Central	6	Kandy	72	Udunuwara				
Central	6	Kandy	73	Yatinuwara				
Central	6	Kandy	74	Delthota				
Central	6	Kandy	75	Doluwa				
Central	6	Kandy	76	Hatharaliyadda				
Central	7	Matale	77	Ambanganga Korale				
Central	7	Matale	78	Dambulla				
Central	7	Matale	79	Galewala				
Central	7	Matale	80	Laggala-Pallegama				
Central	7	Matale	81	Matale				
Central	7	Matale	82	Naula				
Central	7	Matale	83	Pallepola				
Central	7	Matale	84	Rattota				
Central	7	Matale	85	Ukuwela				
Central	7	Matale	86	Wilgamuwa				
Central	7	Matale	87	Yatawatta				
Central	8	Nuwara Eliya	88	Ambagamuwa				
Central	8	Nuwara Eliya	89	Hanguranketha				
Central	8	Nuwara Eliya	90	Kothmale				
Central	8	Nuwara Eliya	91	Nuwara Eliya				
Central	8	Nuwara Eliya	92	Walapane				

=== Uva ===
Province	District		Pradeshiya Sabha		No. of Councillors	Area (km^{2}) (Note: 2012)	Population (2012)	Website
Uva	9	Badulla	93	Badulla				
Uva	9	Badulla	94	Bandarawela				
Uva	9	Badulla	95	Ella				
Uva	9	Badulla	96	Haldummulla				
Uva	9	Badulla	97	Hali-Ela				
Uva	9	Badulla	98	Haputale				
Uva	9	Badulla	99	Kandeketiya				
Uva	9	Badulla	100	Lunugala				
Uva	9	Badulla	101	Mahiyanganaya				
Uva	9	Badulla	102	Meegahakiula				
Uva	9	Badulla	103	Passara				
Uva	9	Badulla	104	Rideemaliyadda				
Uva	9	Badulla	105	Soranatota				
Uva	9	Badulla	106	Uva Paranagama				
Uva	9	Badulla	107	Welimada				
Uva	10	Monaragala	108	Badalkumbara				
Uva	10	Monaragala	109	Bibila				
Uva	10	Monaragala	110	Buttala				
Uva	10	Monaragala	111	Kataragama				
Uva	10	Monaragala	112	Madulla				
Uva	10	Monaragala	113	Medagama				
Uva	10	Monaragala	114	Moneragala				
Uva	10	Monaragala	115	Siyambalanduwa				
Uva	10	Monaragala	116	Thanamalwila				
Uva	10	Monaragala	117	Wellawaya				

=== Southern Province ===
Province	District		Pradeshiya Sabha		No. of Councillors	Area (km^{2}) (Note: 2012)	Population (2012)	Website
Southern	11	Galle	118	Akmeemana				http://akmeemanaps.lk/
Southern	11	Galle	119	Ambalangoda				
Southern	11	Galle	120	Baddegama				
Southern	11	Galle	121	Balapitiya				
Southern	11	Galle	122	Bentota				
Southern	11	Galle	123	Bope-Poddala				
Southern	11	Galle	124	Elpitiya				
Southern	11	Galle	125	Habaraduwa				
Southern	11	Galle	126	Imaduwa				
Southern	11	Galle	127	Karandeniya				
Southern	11	Galle	128	Nagoda				
Southern	11	Galle	129	Neluwa				
Southern	11	Galle	130	Niyagama				
Southern	11	Galle	131	Raggama				
Southern	11	Galle	132	Thawalama				
Southern	11	Galle	133	Welivitiya-Divithura				
Southern	11	Galle	134	Yakkalamulla				
Southern	12	Matara	135	Akuressa				
Southern	12	Matara	136	Athuraliya				
Southern	12	Matara	137	Devinuwara				
Southern	12	Matara	138	Dickwella				
Southern	12	Matara	139	Hakmana				
Southern	12	Matara	140	Kamburupitiya				
Southern	12	Matara	141	Kirinda-Puhulwella				
Southern	12	Matara	142	Kotapola				
Southern	12	Matara	143	Malimbada				
Southern	12	Matara	144	Matara				
Southern	12	Matara	145	Mulatiyana				
Southern	12	Matara	146	Pasgoda				
Southern	12	Matara	147	Pitabeddara				
Southern	12	Matara	148	Thihagoda				
Southern	12	Matara	149	Weligama				
Southern	13	Hambantota	150	Ambalantota				
Southern	13	Hambantota	151	Angunakolapelassa				
Southern	13	Hambantota	152	Beliatta				
Southern	13	Hambantota	153	Hambantota				
Southern	13	Hambantota	154	Katuwana				
Southern	13	Hambantota	155	Lunugamvehera				
Southern	13	Hambantota	156	Sooriyawewa				
Southern	13	Hambantota	157	Tangalle				
Southern	13	Hambantota	158	Tissamaharama				
Southern	13	Hambantota	159	Weeraketiya				

=== Sabaragamuwa ===
Province	District		Pradeshiya Sabha		No. of Councillors	Area (km^{2}) (Note: 2012)	Population (2012)	Website
Sabaragamuwa	14	Ratnapura	160	Ayagama				
Sabaragamuwa	14	Ratnapura	161	Balangoda				
Sabaragamuwa	14	Ratnapura	162	Ehaliyagoda				
Sabaragamuwa	14	Ratnapura	163	Embilipitiya				
Sabaragamuwa	14	Ratnapura	164	Godakawela				
Sabaragamuwa	14	Ratnapura	165	Imbulpe				
Sabaragamuwa	14	Ratnapura	166	Kahawatta				
Sabaragamuwa	14	Ratnapura	167	Kalawana				
Sabaragamuwa	14	Ratnapura	168	Kolonna				
Sabaragamuwa	14	Ratnapura	169	Kuruwita				
Sabaragamuwa	14	Ratnapura	170	Nivithigala				
Sabaragamuwa	14	Ratnapura	171	Pelmadulla				
Sabaragamuwa	14	Ratnapura	172	Rathnapura				
Sabaragamuwa	14	Ratnapura	173	Weligepola				
Sabaragamuwa	15	Kegalle	174	Aranayake				
Sabaragamuwa	15	Kegalle	175	Bulathkohupitiya				
Sabaragamuwa	15	Kegalle	176	Dehiowita				
Sabaragamuwa	15	Kegalle	177	Deraniyagala				
Sabaragamuwa	15	Kegalle	178	Galigamuwa				
Sabaragamuwa	15	Kegalle	179	Kegalle				
Sabaragamuwa	15	Kegalle	180	Mawanella				
Sabaragamuwa	15	Kegalle	181	Rambukkana				
Sabaragamuwa	15	Kegalle	182	Ruwanwella				
Sabaragamuwa	15	Kegalle	183	Warakapola				
Sabaragamuwa	15	Kegalle	184	Yatiyantota				

=== North Central Province ===
Province	District		Pradeshiya Sabha		No. of Councillors	Area (km^{2}) (Note: 2012)	Population (2012)	Website
North Central	16	Anuradhapura	185	Galenbindunuwewa				
North Central	16	Anuradhapura	186	Galnewa				
North Central	16	Anuradhapura	187	Horowpathana				
North Central	16	Anuradhapura	188	Ipalogama				
North Central	16	Anuradhapura	189	Kahatagasdigiliya				
North Central	16	Anuradhapura	190	Kebathigollawa				
North Central	16	Anuradhapura	191	Kekirawa				
North Central	16	Anuradhapura	192	Medawachchiya				
North Central	16	Anuradhapura	193	Mihintale				
North Central	16	Anuradhapura	194	Nochchiyagama				
North Central	16	Anuradhapura	195	Nuwaragam Palatha (East)				
North Central	16	Anuradhapura	196	Nuwaragam Palatha (Central)				
North Central	16	Anuradhapura	197	Padaviya				
North Central	16	Anuradhapura	198	Palagala				
North Central	16	Anuradhapura	199	Rajanganaya				
North Central	16	Anuradhapura	200	Rambewa				
North Central	16	Anuradhapura	201	Thalawa				
North Central	16	Anuradhapura	202	Thirappane				
North Central	17	Polonnaruwa	203	Dimbulagala				
North Central	17	Polonnaruwa	204	Elahera				
North Central	17	Polonnaruwa	205	Hingurakgoda				
North Central	17	Polonnaruwa	206	Lankapura				
North Central	17	Polonnaruwa	207	Medirigiriya				
North Central	17	Polonnaruwa	208	Polonnaruwa				
North Central	17	Polonnaruwa	209	Welikanda				

=== Northern Province ===
Province	District		Pradeshiya Sabha		No. of Councillors	No. of women Councillors	Area (km^{2}) (Note: 2012)	Population (2012)	Website
Northern	18	Jaffna	210	Chavakachcheri					
Northern	18	Jaffna	211	Delft					
Northern	18	Jaffna	212	Karainagar					
Northern	18	Jaffna	213	Kayts					
Northern	18	Jaffna	214	Nallur					
Northern	18	Jaffna	215	Point Pedro					
Northern	18	Jaffna	216	Vadamarachchi South West					
Northern	18	Jaffna	217	Valikamam East					
Northern	18	Jaffna	218	Valikamam North					
Northern	18	Jaffna	219	Valikamam West					
Northern	18	Jaffna	220	Valikamam South					
Northern	18	Jaffna	221	Valikamam South West					
Northern	18	Jaffna	222	Velanai					
Northern	19	Kilinochchi	223	Karachchi					
Northern	19	Kilinochchi	224	Pachchilaipalli					
Northern	19	Kilinochchi	225	Poonakary					
Northern	20	Mannar	226	Mannar					
Northern	20	Mannar	227	Manthai West					
Northern	20	Mannar	228	Musali					
Northern	20	Mannar	229	Nanaddan					
Northern	21	Vavuniya	230	Vavuniya North					
Northern	21	Vavuniya	231	Vavuniya South Sinhala					
Northern	21	Vavuniya	232	Vavuniya South Tamil					
Northern	21	Vavuniya	232	Vengalacheddikulam					
Northern	22	Mullaitivu	234	Manthai East					
Northern	22	Mullaitivu	235	Maritimepattu					
Northern	22	Mullaitivu	236	Puthukudiyiruppu					
Northern	22	Mullaitivu	237	Thunukkai					

=== Eastern Province ===
Province	District		Pradeshiya Sabha		No. of Councillors	No. of Women councilors	Area (km^{2}) (Note: 2012)	Population (2012)	Website
Eastern	23	Batticaloa	238	Eravurpattu					
Eastern	23	Batticaloa	239	Koralaipattu					
Eastern	23	Batticaloa	240	Koralaipattu West					
Eastern	23	Batticaloa	241	Koralaipattu North					
Eastern	23	Batticaloa	242	Manmunai South Eruvilpattu					
Eastern	23	Batticaloa	243	Manmunai					
Eastern	23	Batticaloa	244	Manmunai West					
Eastern	23	Batticaloa	245	Manmunai South West					https://manmunaisouthwestps.com/
Eastern	23	Batticaloa	246	Porativupattu					
Eastern	24	Ampara	247	Dehiyattakandiya					
Eastern	24	Ampara	248	Damana					
Eastern	24	Ampara	249	Uhana					
Eastern	24	Ampara	250	Mahaoya					
Eastern	24	Ampara	251	Namaloya					
Eastern	24	Ampara	252	Padiyatalawa					
Eastern	24	Ampara	253	Sammanthurai					
Eastern	24	Ampara	254	Akkaraipattu					
Eastern	24	Ampara	255	Potuvil					
Eastern	24	Ampara	256	Addalachchnai					
Eastern	24	Ampara	257	Alayadivembu					
Eastern	24	Ampara	258	Lahugala					
Eastern	24	Ampara	259	Nindavur					
Eastern	24	Ampara	260	Thirukkovil					
Eastern	24	Ampara	261	Karaithivu					
Eastern	24	Ampara	262	Navithanveli					
Eastern	24	Ampara	263	Irrakkaram					
Eastern	25	Trincomalee	264	Seruvila					
Eastern	25	Trincomalee	265	Kantalai					
Eastern	25	Trincomalee	266	Morawewa					
Eastern	25	Trincomalee	267	Gomarankadawala					
Eastern	25	Trincomalee	268	Padavisripura					
Eastern	25	Trincomalee	269	Trincomalee Town & Gravets					
Eastern	25	Trincomalee	270	Kuchchaveli					
Eastern	25	Trincomalee	271	Thampalakamam					
Eastern	25	Trincomalee	272	Muttur					
Eastern	25	Trincomalee	273	Kinniya					
Eastern	25	Trincomalee	274	Verugal					

=== Former ===
Renamed in 2017

- Thamankaduwa Pradeshiya Sabha was renamed as Polonnaruwa Pradeshiya Sabha.

== See also ==
- Provincial government in Sri Lanka
- Local government in Sri Lanka
  - Municipal councils of Sri Lanka
  - Urban councils of Sri Lanka
