= 2018 Sri Lankan local elections =

- 10 February 2018

8,327 (Note: Excludes overhang seats.) seats across 340 local authorities
- Turnout: 79.94%
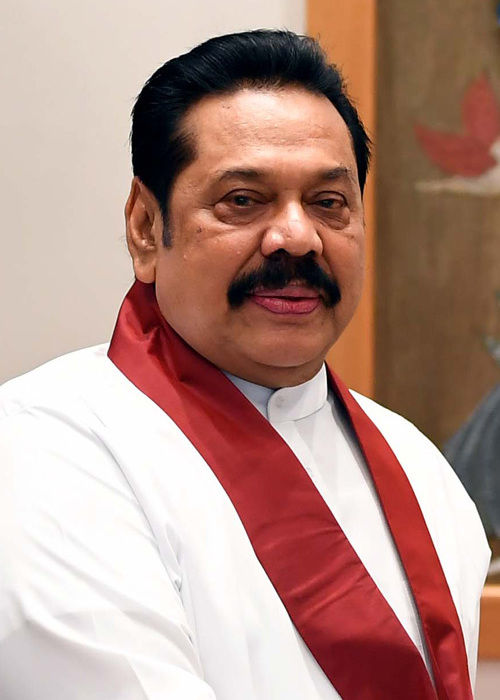

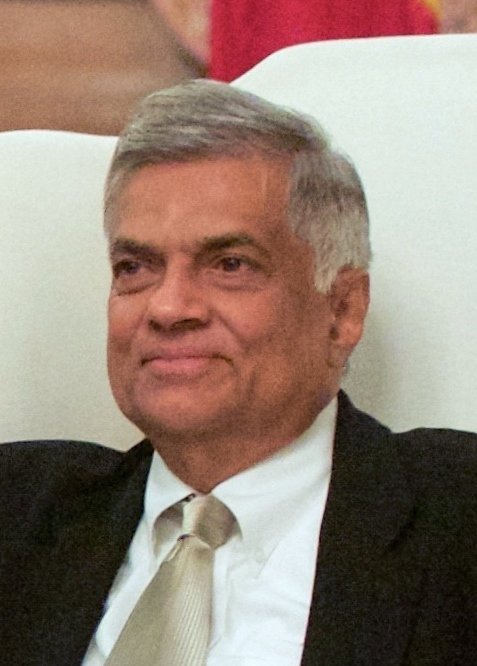

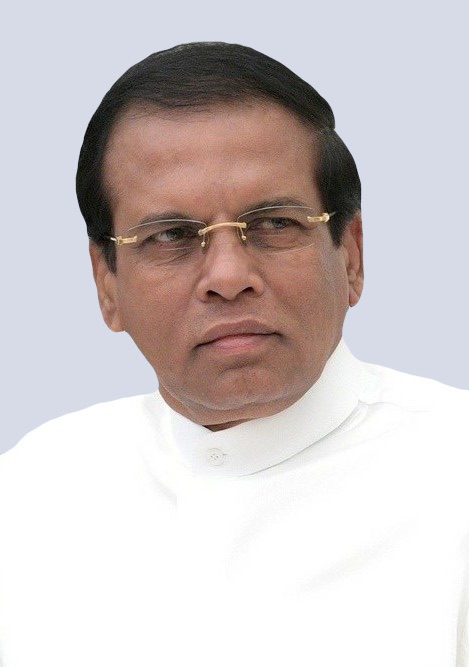

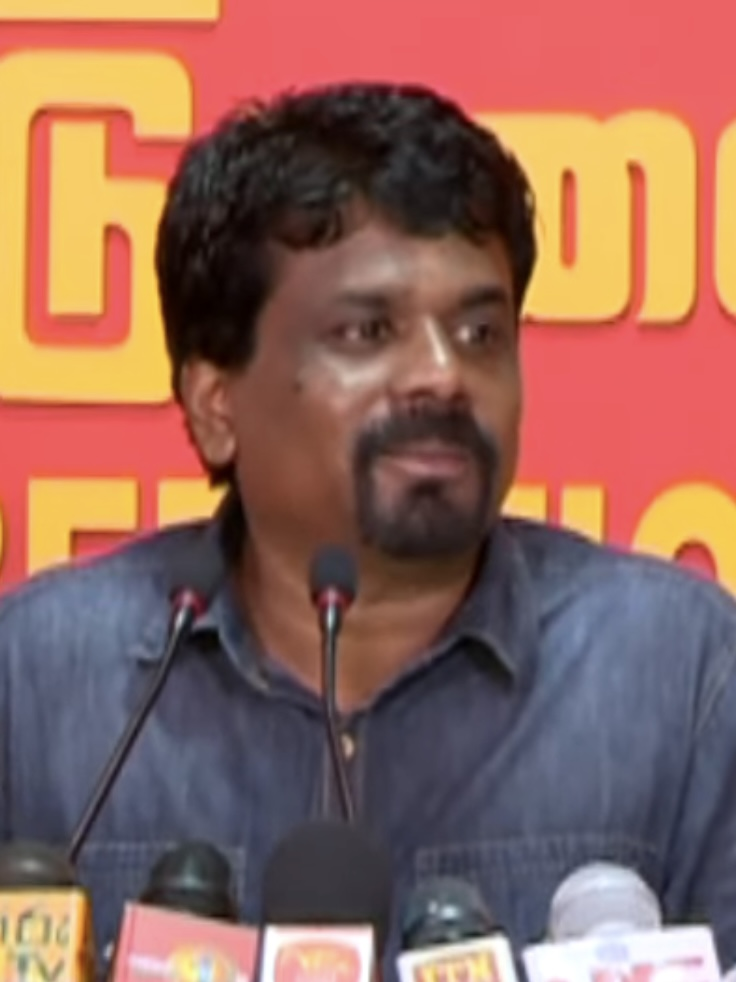

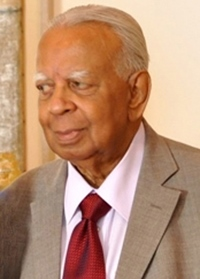
	First party	Second party	Third party
Leader	Mahinda Rajapaksa (Note: Rajapaksa is considered to be the real leader of the Sri Lanka Podujana Peramuna, whilst its official leader, G. L. Peiris is considered to be a proxy.)	Ranil Wickremesinghe	Maithripala Sirisena
Party	SLPP	UNF	UPFA
Seats before	New	1,157 (Note: Represents seats won at the 2008, 2009 and 2011 elections.)	2,639
Popular vote	5,006,837	3,640,620	1,497,234
Percentage	40.47%	29.42%	12.10%
Councillors	3,436	2,433	1,048
Local Authorities	231	34	9
	Fourth party	Fifth party
Leader	Anura Kumara Dissanayake	R. Sampanthan
Party	JVP	TNA
Seats before	74	282
Popular vote	710,932	337,877
Percentage	5.75%	2.73%
Councillors	434	417
Local Authorities	0	41

Local elections were held in Sri Lanka on 10 February 2018. 15.7 million Sri Lankans were eligible to elect 8,327 members to 340 local authorities (24 municipal councils, 41 urban councils and 275 divisional councils). It was the largest election in Sri Lankan history. This was also the first election under the mixed electoral system where 60% of members were elected using first-past-the-post voting and the remaining 40% through closed list proportional representation.

In a surprise result, the newly formed Sri Lanka Podujana Peramuna, led by former president Mahinda Rajapaksa, came first, winning 40% of the votes and securing the most number of seats and local authorities. The United National Front led by Prime Minister of Sri Lanka Ranil Wickremesinghe came second with 29% of the votes whilst the United People's Freedom Alliance led by President Maithripala Sirisena came third with 12% of the votes. However, most local authorities were hung with no overall control.

== Background ==
The last major round of local government elections was held in 2011 when elections were held in 322 of the then 335 local authorities. Elections to two other local authorities in Mullaitivu District were due but were repeatedly postponed due to alleged delays in resettling internally displaced persons following the end of the civil war in 2009. Elections to the remaining 11 local authorities were not due as they had their last election in 2008 or 2009. Since 2011 six new local authorities have been created (1 MC, 5 DC) taking the total number of local authorities to 341 (24 MC, 41 UC, 276 DC).

The normal term of a local authority is four years but the law allows the central government to extend this by a further year. The term of the 234 local authorities (3 MC, 30 UC, 201 DC) that had their election on 17 March 2011 was due to expire on 31 March 2015 but on 27 March 2015 their term was extended to 15 May 2015. These 234 local authorities were then dissolved and their administration placed under special commissioners appointed by the government. The term of the 65 local authorities (1 MC, 9 UC, 55 DC) that had their election on 23 July 2011 expired on 31 July 2015 after which their administration was placed under special commissioners. The term of the 23 local authorities (16 MC, 1 UC, 6 DC) that had their election on 8 October 2011 was due to expire on 15/31 October 2015 but in October 2015 their term was extended to 31 December 2015. This was subsequently extended to 30 June 2016. These 23 local authorities were then dissolved and their administration placed under special commissioners.

On 10 October 2012 Parliament passed the Local Authorities (Special Provisions) Act, No. 21 of 2012 and Local Authorities Elections (Amendment) Act, No. 22 of 2012, changing the electoral system for electing local authority members from open list proportional representation (PR) to a mixed electoral system whereby 70% of members would be elected using first-past-the-post voting (FPTP) and the remaining 30% through closed list PR. The number of local authority members was increased significantly from around 4,500 to 8,000.

A five member National Delimitation Committee headed by Jayalath Dissanayake was appointed by Minister of Local Government and Provincial Councils A. L. M. Athaullah on 12 December 2012 to demarcate the new local authority wards. After much delay the committee's final report was handed over to Minister of Provincial Councils and Local Government Faiszer Musthapha on 19 June 2015. The committee recommended that the number of members elected using FPTP be increased by 595 to 5,081. On 21 August 2015 a gazette was published detailing the wards. The new wards received more than 1,000 complaints and as a result the government appointed the Delimitation Appeals Investigation Committee headed by Ashoka Peiris to review the complaints. The appeals committee's report was handed over to Musthapha on 17 January 2017. The revised ward details were gazetted on 17 February 2017.

In February 2016 Parliament passed Local Authorities Elections (Amendment) Act, No. 1 of 2016 requiring 25% of candidates at local elections to be female. Small parties and those representing ethnic minorities complained that the new mixed electoral system put them at a disadvantage and as a result the government agreed to change the ratio between FPTP and PR. On 25 August 2017 Parliament passed Local Authorities Elections (Amendment) Act, No. 16 of 2017 which, amongst things, changed the ratio between FPTP and PR from 70:30 to 60:40.

On 15 November 2017 six voters filed a petition with the Court of Appeal challenging the legality of the gazette on demarcation of wards issued in February 2017, affecting 208 local authorities. On 22 November 2017 the Court of Appeal suspended the implementation of the gazette until 4 December 2017, preventing elections from being called to the 208 local authorities. Nominations to 93 local authorities not affected by the petition were called by the Election Commission on 27 November 2017. Nominations to 40 other local authorities not affected by the petition could not be called due to errors in the gazette.

The legal petition was withdrawn on 30 November 2017 following which the Court of Appeal rescinded the suspension of the gazette. The gazette correcting the errors in respect of 40 local authorities was published on 2 December 2017. Nominations to the remaining 248 local authorities were called by the Election Commission on 4 December 2017.

== Prior to the election ==
Opinion poll conducted by the Centre for Policy Alternatives revealed Fifty-six percent of respondents said the coalition government should not continue. Specially 63 percent of majority Sinhalese respondents.

Sri Lankan recent election results
Dates of elections	United People's Freedom Alliance		United National Party		Tamil National Alliance		Janatha Vimukthi Peramuna		Sri Lanka Muslim Congress		Independents	
Dates of elections	Votes	%	Votes	%	Votes	%	Votes	%	Votes	%	Votes	%
Local election 2011	4,821,203	56.45%	2,710,222	31.73%	255,078	2.99%	242,502	2.84%	140,727	1.65%	219,998	2.58%
Presidential election, 2015	5,768,090	47.58%	6,217,162	51.28% (Note: New Democratic Front candidate led by the United National Party)	－	－	－	－	－	－	－	－
Parliamentary election, 2015	4,732,664	42.38%	5,098,916	45.66% (Note: United National Front for Good Governance figures)	515,963	4.62%	543,944	4.87%	44,193	0.40%	42,828	0.38%

Sri Lankan political map prior to this election
Presidential election, 2015	Parliamentary election, 2015
Elected members of each electoral district or municipalities, gaining the highest number of votes: United People's Freedom Alliance United National Party/United National Front for Good Governance/New Democratic Front Tamil National Alliance

== Details ==
=== Nominations ===
Nominations to 93 local authorities (7 MC, 18 UC, 68 DC) without any legal issues took place between 11 and 14 December 2017. 523 nominations (466 form registered political parties, 57 from independent groups) were received of which 500 were accepted (447 form registered political parties, 53 from independent groups) and 23 rejected (19 form registered political parties, 4 from independent groups).

Nominations to the remaining 248 local authorities (17 MC, 23 UC, 208 DC) took place between 18 and 21 December 2017. 1,582 nominations (1,399 form registered political parties, 183 from independent groups) were received of which 1,553 were accepted (1,379 form registered political parties, 174 from independent groups) and 29 rejected (20 form registered political parties, 9 from independent groups).

On 18 December 2017 the Election Commission announced that elections to all 341 local authorities would be held on 10 February 2018. Around 13,000 polling stations were used. The election is expected to cost around Rs. 4 billion and required 300,000 staff, including public sector employees. Postal voting has taken place on 25 and 26 January 2018.

On 30 January 2018 the Supreme Court issued an injunction preventing election in Elpitiya DC following a petition by the Democratic United National Front against the rejection of their nomination list.

=== Calculation of seats ===
60 percent of the seats in each local government authority were elected under the first-past-the-post (FPTP) system. The candidate who receives the most votes were declared the elected representative. The other 40 percent of seats were elected based on the proportion of votes received by each contesting political party or independent group. To complete the seat calculation, the district returning officers first counts the total number of valid votes cast and divides that number by the total number of seats up for election in a given local authority. This number represents the average number of votes cast per seat (X). To identify the number of seats a political party or independent group gained (Y), the district returning officer then takes the total number of valid votes a party or group received in the local authority and divides that by the average number of votes per seat (X). Finally, to account for seats already won through the FPTP system, the district returning officer takes the total number of seats a political party or independent group gained (Y) and subtracts the total number won through FPTP. The result is the number of seats a political party or group is entitled to under the proportional representation system.

== Parties ==
=== United People's Freedom Alliance ===
The main constituent party of the United People's Freedom Alliance, the Sri Lanka Freedom Party, underwent a split not long before the election, as SLFP MPs loyal to former president Mahinda Rajapaksa broke away from the SLFP to create a political front of their own.

The UPFA subsequently contested for some seats as an alliance while the Sri Lanka Freedom Party contested alone in others, with both being led by incumbent president Maithripala Sirisena. This marks the first time since 1991 that the SLFP contested under their own election symbol.

=== United National Front ===
The ruling United National Front, led by the United National Party's Ranil Wickramasinghe contested under the elephant election symbol, bringing together constituent parties including the Jathika Hela Urumaya led by Champika Ranawaka, the Sri Lanka Muslim Congress led by Rauff Hakeem, and the Tamil Progressive Alliance led by Palani Digambaran.

=== Sri Lanka Podujana Peramuna ===
The Sri Lanka Podujana Peramuna (SLPP) led by former president Mahinda Rajapaksa contested with the flower bud as their election symbol, winning the majority of the seats up for election and control over most of the island's local authorities.

=== Janatha Vimukthi Peramuna ===
The Janatha Vimukthi Peramuna contested in this election as well.

== Results ==
The elections resulted in parties winning an absolute majority of seats in only 141 of the 340 local authorities - Sri Lanka Podujana Peramuna (SLPP) in 126 LA's, United National Front (UNF) in five, independents in two, National Congress in two, Tamil National Alliance (TNA) in two, United People's Freedom Alliance (UPFA) in two, Ceylon Workers' Congress (CWC) in one and Eelam People's Democratic Party (EPDP) in one.

The remaining 199 LA's were hung with no overall control. Of these, the SLPP was the largest party in 95 LA's, TNA in 36, UNF in 29, Sri Lanka Muslim Congress in four, UPFA in four, Independents in three, CWC in two, Tamil National People's Front in two, EPDP in one, United Lanka Great Council in one, Muslim National Alliance in one, Tamil Makkal Viduthalai Pulikal in one and Tamil United Liberation Front in one. The remaining 19 LA's were tied (SLPP/UNF in nine LA's, ACMC/UNF in two, TNA/TMVP in two, CWC/UNF in one, SLFP/SLPP in one, SLMC/SLPP/UPFA in one, SLMC/UNF in one, TNA/UNF in one and UNF/UPFA in one).

=== National ===
Summary of the 2018 Sri Lankan local elections
Alliances and parties	Votes	%	Seats			LA's
Alliances and parties	Votes	%	Ward	PR	Total	LA's
Sri Lanka Podujana Peramuna: Democratic Left Front (Note: The DLF contested separately in one LA and with the SLPP in other LA's.); Lanka Sama Samaja Party (Note: The LSSP contested separately in 12 LA's and with the SLPP in other LA's.); Mahajana Eksath Peramuna; National Freedom Front; Pivithuru Hela Urumaya; Sri Lanka Freedom Party (Rajapaksa wing); Tamil Makkal Viduthalai Pulikal (Note: The TMVP contested separately in eight LA's and with the SLPP in other LA's.)	5,006,837	40.47%	3,255	181	3,436	126
United National Front (Note: The UNFGG contested under the name and symbol of UNP.): All Ceylon Makkal Congress (Note: The ACMC contested separately in 37 LA's and with the UNF in other LA's.); Jathika Hela Urumaya; Sri Lanka Muslim Congress (Note: The SLMC contested separately in 46 LA's and with the UNF in other LA's.); Tamil Progressive Alliance (Note: The TPA contested separately in 14 LA's and with the UNF in other LA's.); National Union of Workers; United Progressive Alliance; Democratic People's Front; Up-Country People's Front; United National Party	3,640,620	29.42%	872	1,561	2,433	5
United People's Freedom Alliance (Note: The UPFA contested under the UPFA name in 208 LA's and SLFP name in 120 LA's.): Ceylon Workers' Congress (Note: The CWC contested separately in 12 LA's and with the UPFA in other LA's.); National Congress (Note: The NC contested separately in 10 LA's and with the UPFA in other LA's.); Sri Lanka Freedom Party (Sirisena wing)	1,497,234	12.10%	204	844	1,048	2
Janatha Vimukthi Peramuna	710,932	5.75%	1	433	434	0
Tamil National Alliance (Note: The TNA contested under the name and symbol of ITAK.): Illankai Tamil Arasu Kachchi; People's Liberation Organisation of Tamil Eelam; Tamil Eelam Liberation Organization	337,877	2.73%	389	28	417	2
Independents	374,132	3.02%	93	181	274	2
Tamil National People's Front (Note: The TNPF contested under the name and symbol of ACTC.): All Ceylon Tamil Congress	85,198	0.69%	45	57	102	0
Eelam People's Democratic Party	74,128	0.60%	41	57	98	1
Tamil United Liberation Front: Eelam People's Revolutionary Liberation Front; Tamil United Liberation Front	72,493	0.59%	22	56	78	0
Sri Lanka Muslim Congress	92,897	0.75%	44	29	73	0
All Ceylon Makkal Congress: All Ceylon Makkal Congress; United Peace Alliance	85,437	0.69%	21	44	65	0
Ceylon Workers' Congress	100,641	0.81%	38	21	59	1
Tamil Makkal Viduthalai Pulikal	44,062	0.36%	14	23	37	0
Tamil Progressive Alliance (Note: The TPA contested under the name and symbol of UPA.): National Union of Workers; United Progressive Alliance; Democratic People's Front; Up-Country People's Front	50,974	0.41%	2	24	26	0

Others	199,354	1.61%	33	95	128	2
National Congress	26,465	0.21%	18	8	26	2
United National Freedom Front	38,682	0.31%	1	20	21	0
National Front for Good Governance	24,275	0.20%	0	18	18	0
National People's Party	17,128	0.14%	0	10	10	0
Muslim National Alliance	9,704	0.08%	3	6	9	0
United Lanka Great Council	7,011	0.06%	6	0	6	0
Democratic United National Front	11,187	0.09%	0	5	5	0
United Peace Alliance	10,861	0.09%	1	4	5	0
United People's Party	9,035	0.07%	0	5	5	0
Democratic Unity Alliance	4,990	0.04%	0	5	5	0
Social Democratic Party of Tamils	4,890	0.04%	1	4	5	0
People's Welfare Front	6,782	0.05%	1	2	3	0
Democratic National Movement	6,140	0.05%	1	1	2	0
Sri Lanka National Force	4,592	0.04%	0	2	2	0
Communist Party of Sri Lanka	3,049	0.02%	0	1	1	0
Sri Lanka People's Party	2,747	0.02%	0	1	1	0
Lanka Sama Samaja Party	2,684	0.02%	0	1	1	0
Liberal Party of Sri Lanka	2,034	0.02%	0	1	1	0
Socialist Party of Sri Lanka	1,522	0.01%	0	1	1	0
United Left Front	1,474	0.01%	1	0	1	0
United Socialist Party	1,162	0.01%	0	0	0	0
All Are Citizens All Are Kings Organization	931	0.01%	0	0	0	0
Nava Sama Samaja Party	730	0.01%	0	0	0	0
Motherland People's Party	521	0.00%	0	0	0	0
New Sinhala Heritage	282	0.00%	0	0	0	0
Socialist Equality Party	145	0.00%	0	0	0	0
Democratic Left Front	134	0.00%	0	0	0	0
All Lanka Tamil Great Council	117	0.00%	0	0	0	0
Democratic National Alliance	45	0.00%	0	0	0	0
Our National Front	35	0.00%	0	0	0	0

No overall control	199

Valid Votes	12,372,816	100.00%	5,074	3,634	8,708	340
Rejected Votes	210,970	1.68%				
Total Polled	12,583,786	79.94%				
Registered Electors	15,742,371					

Footnotes:

=== District ===
Districts won by SLPP
Districts won by TNA
Districts won by UNF

District results for the 2018 Sri Lankan locan elections
Dis	Pro	Sri Lanka Podujana Peramuna					United National Front					United People's Freedom Alliance					Janatha Vimukthi Peramuna					Tamil National Alliance					Turnout
Dis	Pro	Votes	%	Seats			Votes	%	Seats			Votes	%	Seats			Votes	%	Seats			Votes	%	Seats			Turnout
Dis	Pro	Votes	%	W	PR	T	Votes	%	W	PR	T	Votes	%	W	PR	T	Votes	%	W	PR	T	Votes	%	W	PR	T	Turnout
AMP	EA	88,098	22.15%	96	4	100	114,356	28.76%	40	65	105	41,102	10.34%	19	25	44	9,690	2.44%	0	11	11	24,468	6.15%	27	0	27	80.24%
ANU	NC	245,545	43.93%	193	0	193	155,041	27.74%	20	87	107	88,646	15.86%	7	51	58	38,182	6.83%	0	25	25	-	-	-	-	-	82.04%
BAD	UV	162,577	31.41%	109	19	128	169,132	32.68%	77	53	130	104,406	20.17%	32	54	86	34,132	6.59%	0	26	26	-	-	-	-	-	81.98%
BAT	EA	408	0.14%	0	0	0	44,619	15.26%	13	24	37	45,031	15.40%	24	14	38	1,003	0.34%	0	0	0	80,622	27.58%	69	6	75	76.20%
COL	WE	476,873	38.38%	185	34	219	410,522	33.04%	115	82	197	134,147	10.80%	3	57	60	104,707	8.43%	0	46	46	-	-	-	-	-	76.79%
GAL	SO	321,102	50.46%	238	3	241	169,234	26.59%	15	97	112	75,827	11.91%	2	49	51	40,634	6.38%	0	28	28	-	-	-	-	-	81.19%
GAM	WE	655,554	49.19%	341	19	360	395,360	29.66%	68	143	211	136,298	10.23%	6	63	69	102,177	7.67%	0	54	54	-	-	-	-	-	78.64%
HAM	SO	199,018	49.94%	138	6	144	101,702	25.52%	21	50	71	41,059	10.30%	1	28	29	51,029	12.81%	0	32	32	-	-	-	-	-	83.08%
JAF	NO	3,287	1.08%	0	3	3	19,105	6.30%	5	20	25	24,461	8.07%	6	26	32	553	0.18%	0	0	0	105,947	34.94%	141	12	153	65.81%
KAL	WE	350,382	46.55%	212	3	215	235,118	31.24%	56	94	150	79,000	10.50%	2	48	50	47,754	6.34%	1	30	31	-	-	-	-	-	81.75%
KAN	CE	360,732	41.41%	255	17	272	303,053	34.79%	109	111	220	109,749	12.60%	7	72	79	37,184	4.27%	0	24	24	-	-	-	-	-	81.15%
KEG	SA	249,431	46.05%	171	7	178	180,579	33.34%	42	78	120	72,209	13.33%	3	44	47	21,807	4.03%	0	12	12	-	-	-	-	-	82.20%
KIL	NO	474	0.75%	0	0	0	3,009	4.73%	0	3	3	3,174	4.99%	0	5	5	488	0.77%	0	0	0	30,205	47.48%	33	1	34	74.82%
KUR	NW	505,749	47.68%	325	8	333	341,983	32.24%	50	153	203	120,163	11.33%	2	67	69	58,776	5.54%	0	35	35	-	-	-	-	-	81.62%
MAN	NO	2,536	3.67%	0	3	3	23,587	34.14%	26	8	34	5,993	8.67%	0	8	8	91	0.13%	0	0	0	19,487	28.21%	25	3	28	80.36%
MTL	CE	151,130	47.19%	138	3	141	107,117	33.44%	26	65	91	36,287	11.33%	4	30	34	15,413	4.81%	0	12	12	-	-	-	-	-	80.74%
MTR	SO	275,767	53.48%	207	1	208	135,672	26.31%	17	84	101	50,803	9.85%	0	37	37	47,922	9.29%	0	33	33	-	-	-	-	-	81.48%
MON	UV	164,295	53.88%	113	1	114	85,296	27.97%	8	48	56	30,580	10.03%	0	21	21	20,184	6.62%	0	14	14	-	-	-	-	-	85.83%
MUL	NO	2,291	4.11%	1	1	2	8,279	14.85%	5	7	12	4,580	8.22%	0	7	7	394	0.71%	0	0	0	22,682	40.69%	30	2	32	77.76%
NUW	CE	107,015	24.04%	64	20	84	165,597	37.20%	69	47	116	44,793	10.06%	13	23	36	11,365	2.55%	0	8	8	-	-	-	-	-	81.04%
POL	NC	94,136	35.09%	51	11	62	69,474	25.90%	10	33	43	89,005	33.18%	41	17	58	12,866	4.80%	0	8	8	-	-	-	-	-	84.27%
PUT	NW	182,637	42.94%	124	9	133	134,007	31.50%	38	59	97	53,699	12.62%	12	29	41	15,392	3.62%	0	10	10	-	-	-	-	-	73.30%
RAT	SA	362,296	52.28%	230	2	232	218,987	31.60%	27	109	136	62,865	9.07%	1	39	40	33,152	4.78%	0	21	21	-	-	-	-	-	82.53%
TRI	EA	37,638	16.99%	50	4	54	35,736	16.14%	10	28	38	28,969	13.08%	12	21	33	4,395	1.98%	0	2	2	32,446	14.65%	33	3	36	82.29%
VAV	NO	7,866	9.33%	14	3	17	14,055	16.68%	5	13	18	14,388	17.07%	7	9	16	1,642	1.95%	0	2	2	22,020	26.13%	31	1	32	75.03%
Total		5,006,837	40.47%	3,255	181	3,436	3,640,620	29.42%	872	1,561	2,433	1,497,234	12.10%	204	844	1,048	710,932	5.75%	1	433	434	337,877	2.73%	389	28	417	79.94%

== Aftermath ==
With so many local authorities hung with no overall control the path was open for back-room deals between parties to take control of local authorities. As result the leadership of several local authorities was captured by a party other than that which won the most number of seats.

Central Province

- In Hatton–Dickoya UC, where the UNF was the largest single party, CWC candidate Sadayan Balachandran was elected chairman.
- In Maskeliya DC, where the CWC and UNF were tied, CWC candidate Shenbagavalli was elected chairman.
- In Nuwara Eliya DC, where the UNF was the largest single party, CWC candidate V. Yogaraja was elected chairman.

Eastern Province

- In Nintavur DC, where the ACMC and UNF were tied, ACMC candidate M. A. M. Thahir was elected chairman.
- In Sammanthurai DC, where the ACMC and UNF were tied, ACMC candidate A. M. M. Nawsad was elected chairman.

Northern Province

- In Chavakachcheri UC, where the TNPF was the largest single party, TNA candidate Sivamangai Ramanathan was elected chairman.
- In Delft DC, where the EPDP was the largest single party, TNA candidate Philip Patrick Roshan was elected chairman.
- In Manthai East DC, where the TNA was the largest single party, UNF candidate Mahalingam Dayananthan was elected chairman.
- In Point Pedro UC, where the TNPF was the largest single party, TNA candidate Joseph Iruthayaraja was elected chairman.
- In Vavuniya UC, where the TNA was the largest single party, EPRLF candidate R. Gowthaman was elected chairman.
- In Velanai DC, where the TNA was the largest single party, EPDP candidate Namasivayama Karunamoorthy was elected chairman.

North Western Province

- In Kurunegala MC, where the SLPP and UNF were tied, SLPP candidate Thushara Sanjeewa Witharana was elected mayor.
- In Puttalam UC, where the SLMC and UNF were tied, SLMC candidate K. A. Bais was elected chairman.

Sabaragamuwa Province

- In Aranayake DC, where the SLPP was the largest single party, UNF candidate SNihal Seneviratne was elected chairman.

Southern Province

- In Galle MC, where the UNF was the largest single party, SLPP candidate Priyantha Sahabandu Godage was elected mayor.
- In Hambantota MC, where the UNF was the largest single party, UPFA candidate Eraj Ravindra Fernando was elected mayor.
- In Tangalle UC, where the SLPP and UNF were tied, UNF candidate Ravindu Wedaaracahhi was elected chairman.

Uva Province

- In Badulla MC, where the UNF was the largest single party, SLPP candidate Thushara Sanjeewa Witharana was elected mayor.

Western Province

- In Dehiwala-Mount Lavinia MC, where the SLPP and UNF were tied, SLPP candidate Nawalage Stanley Dias was elected mayor.
- In Katunayake-Seeduwa UC, where the SLPP was the largest single party, UNF candidate Sarath Peiris was elected chairman.
- In Negombo MC, where the UNF was the largest single party, SLPP candidate Warnakulasuriya Moses Dayan Lanza was elected mayor.
- In Seethawakapura UC, where the UNF was the largest single party, SLPP candidate K. A. Ranaweera was elected chairman.
