= Vadamarachchi =

Vadamarachchi வடமராட்சி වඩමාරච්චි
- Region
- Location within Sri Lanka
- Coordinates: 09°42′N 80°19′E
- Country: Sri Lanka
- Province: Northern
- District: Jaffna
- Largest town: Point Pedro
- Divisional Secretariats: List: Vadamarachchi East; Vadamarachchi North; Vadamarachchi SW

Area
  - Total: 238.6 km^{2} (92.1 sq mi)

Population (2007)
  - Total: 106,179
  - Density: 445.0/km^{2} (1,153/sq mi)
- Time zone: UTC+05:30 (Sri Lanka)

Vadamarachchi (Tamil: வடமராட்சி Vaṭamarāṭci, Sinhala: වඩමාරච්චි) is one of the three historic regions of the Jaffna Peninsula in northern Sri Lanka. The other two regions are Thenmarachchi and Valikamam. Alternative spellings include Vadamarachi, Vadamaraachi or Vadamaraadchi.

== Etymology ==
Vadamarachchi translates to "possession of northerners" or "rule of the northerners" in English. It is derived from the Tamil words vadamar/ vada+maravar (northerners) and achchi (possession or rule).

== See also ==
- Thenmarachchi
- Valikamam
