= List of Archaeological Protected Monuments in Kilinochchi District =

This is a list of Archaeological Protected Monuments in Kilinochchi District, Sri Lanka.

Monument	Image	Location	Grama Niladhari Division	Divisional Secretary's Division	Registered	Description	Refs
Akkarayan ruins		Akkarayan	No. 5, Akkarayan	Karachchi	25 March 2016	Hillocks of ruins	
Arisapuram Allirani Kotuwa		Arisapuram	No. 65, Pallikuda	Pooneryn	25 March 2016	Hillocks of ruins	
Gautharmunei Shiva kovil ruins			Gautharmunei	Pooneryn	12 June 2015		
Kalmunei Old survey post		Kalmunei	No. KN 68, Gavutharmunei	Pooneryn	25 March 2016		
Maninthale Shiva kovil ruins		Maninthale	No. KN 68, Gautharmunei	Pooneryn	12 June 2015		
Pooneryn fort		'Pooneryn city' village	No. 35, Mattuwilnadu South	Pooneryn	25 March 2016	Punarin Dutch fortress	
Shivanagar Kovil ruins		Shivanagar	No. 35, Shivanagar	Karachchi	25 March 2016	Hillock of Buddhist Stupa and ruined buildings at the premises	
Uttupulam ruins		Uttupulami	Uttupulam	Karachchi	25 March 2016	Ruins with hillock of ruined Stupa, ruins of buildings and old well	
