= Rathnapuram =

- Village
- Location in Sri Lanka
- Coordinates: 9.353°N 80.436°E
- Country: Sri Lanka
- Province: Northern
- District: Kilinochchi
- Divisional Secretariate: Karachchi
- Time zone: UTC+5:30 (SLST)

Rathnapuram is a village situated in northern part of Sri Lanka. The administrative district is Kilinochchi and the local government unit is Karachchi. This village was controlled by the Liberation Tigers of Tamil Eelam (LTTE, also known as the Tamil Tigers). The site was believed by Sri Lanka Armed Forces to be the main female Black Tiger training and coordinating facility and was targeted by their fighter jets in 2008. After the defeating of LTTE in 2009, it become under the Sri Lankan government. Its economy is based on agriculture, especially paddy fields.
