= Vadamarachchi South West Divisional Council =

Local authority of Vadamarachchi South West DS Division, Sri Lanka

Vadamarachchi South West Divisional Council வடமராட்சி தென் மேற்கு பிரதேச சபை

Type
- Type: Local authority

Leadership
- Chairman: Thangavelayutham Ainkaran, TNA since April 03
- Deputy Chairman: Kanthar Ponnaijah, TNA since April 03
- Seats: 38

Elections
- Last election: 2011 Sri Lankan local government elections

Vadamarachchi South West Divisional Council (Tamil: வடமராட்சி தென் மேற்கு பிரதேச சபை Vaṭamarāṭci Teṉ Mēṟku Piratēca Capai; VSWDC) is the local authority for Vadamarachchi South West DS Division in northern Sri Lanka. VSWDC is responsible for providing a variety of local public services including roads, sanitation, drains, housing, libraries, public parks and recreational facilities. It has 18 members elected using the open list proportional representation system.

== History ==
In 1987 there was a major re-organisation of local government in Sri Lanka. District Development Councils were abolished and replaced by Divisional Councils (Pradeshiya Sabha or Pradesha Sabhai). The Pradeshiya Sabha Act No. 15 of 1987 was passed by Parliament on 15 April 1987 and on 1 January 1988 257 Divisional Councils started functioning. The Divisional Councils were generally commensurate with their namesake Divisional Secretary's Divisions. Vadamarachchi South West Divisional Council was established as the local authority for the Vadamarachchi South West DS Division. However, according to the pro-LTTE TamilNet, the Sri Lankan government had suspended all local government in the north and east of the country in 1983 using emergency regulations. The civil war prevented elections from being held for SWDC until 1998 as the LTTE did not hold elections when it controlled the area.

In March 1994 elections were held in the east and in Vavuniya in the north. However, elections weren't held in other areas of the north, including the Jaffna Peninsula, because most of these areas were at that time controlled by the rebel Tamil Tigers. In August 1995 the Sri Lankan military launched an offensive to recapture the Jaffna Peninsula. By December 1995 the military had captured most of the Valikamam region of the peninsula, including the city of Jaffna. By 16 May 1996 the military had recaptured the entire peninsula. In late 1996 the government announced elections would be held for 23 local authorities in Jaffna District, Kilinochchi District, Mannar District and Vavuniya District but following opposition from Tamil political parties postponed them. On 3 December 1997 the government announced that elections would be held for the 17 local authorities on the Jaffna Peninsula. The Tamil political parties were still opposed to holding elections as "normalcy" hadn't returned to the peninsula. The peninsula was under the firm grip of the Sri Lankan military and civil government had little, if any, role in the administration of the peninsula. The Tamil Tigers were also firmly against the elections being held. Despite these objections the elections were held on 29 January 1998.

== Election results ==
=== 1998 local government election ===
Results of the local government election held on 29 January 1998:

Alliances and parties	Votes	%	Seats
Eelam People's Democratic Party	3,888	45.11%	9
Democratic People's Liberation Front (PLOTE)	2,940	34.11%	6
Tamil Eelam Liberation Organization	1,236	14.34%	2
Eelam People's Revolutionary Liberation Front	554	6.43%	0
Valid Votes	8,618	100.00%	17
Rejected Votes	1,868		
Total Polled	10,486		
Registered Electors	45,214		
Turnout	23.19%		

On 1 January 2002 local authority elections were called for the entire country. It was later announced that elections would be held on 25 March 2002 in the north and east, and on 20 March 2002 in the rest of the country. The normal life term of Sri Lankan local government bodies is four years. The life term of VSWDC expired in February 2002 but the central government extended this by another year, as the law allows. On 21 March 2002 the Election Commissioner announced that the elections in the north and east, except for eight local authorities in Ampara District, had been postponed until 25 September 2002. On 17 September 2002 elections in the north and east were postponed, for a second time, until 25 June 2003. Elections should have been held when the extension expired in February 2003 but in January 2003, following a request from the Tamil National Alliance, the central government instead dissolved VSWDC using emergency powers and instead put in place special commissioners to administer the local area. In June 2003 elections in the north and east were postponed, for a third time, until 24 January 2004. In January 2004 elections in the north and east, except for local authorities in Ampara District, were postponed, for a fourth time, until 23 October 2004.

On 27 January 2006 local authority elections were called for the entire country. It was later announced that elections would be held on 30 March 2006 across the entire country. The Election Commissioner subsequently postponed the elections in the north and Batticaloa District until 30 September 2006. On 23 September 2006 elections in the north and Batticaloa District were postponed until 30 June 2007.

VSWDC continued to be administered by special commissioners until the 2011 elections.

=== 2011 local government election ===
Results of the local government election held on 23 July 2011:

Alliances and parties	Votes	%	Seats
Tamil National Alliance (EPRLF (S), ITAK, PLOTE, TELO, TULF)	12,454	81.46%	15
United People's Freedom Alliance (EPDP, SLFP et al.)	2,522	16.50%	3
United National Party	290	1.90%	0
Independent	22	0.14%	0
Valid Votes	15,288	100.00%	18
Rejected Votes	1,386		
Total Polled	16,674		
Registered Electors	32,539		
Turnout	51.24%		

The following candidates were elected: Ponnaijah Vijakesu (TNA), 3,962 preference votes (pv); Ilayathampi Santhasoruban (TNA), 3,026 pv; Ponnampalam Kugathaas (TNA), 3,021 pv; Kanthan Rathnam (TNA), 2,537 pv; Kanthan Paranchothi (TNA), 1,923 pv; Ponnaijah Ganesh (TNA), 1,791 pv; Ponnan Thampimuthu (TNA), 1,709 pv; Aalvaapillai Mathijarasan (TNA), 1,694 pv; Arunachalam Santhirasegaram (UPFA), 1,569 pv; Majilu Saththijanathan (TNA), 1,460 pv; Nadarasa Kanthasami (TNA), 1,245 pv; Seevarathnam Rathneswaran (TNA), 1,220 pv; Earampu Rasaijah (TNA), 1,061 pv; Muthaijah Jeganathan (TNA), 1,012 pv; Kanakaratnam Balasubramanijam (TNA), 776 pv; Inthirarasa Thuseekaran (UPFA), 630 pv; Sethulingam Paliraj (TNA), 623 pv; and Sinnathamby Kanapathippillai (UPFA), 621 pv.

Ponnaijah Vijakesu (TNA) and Ilayathampi Santhasoruban (TNA) were appointed chairman and deputy chairman respectively.

== Local Authority Final Result-2018 ==
Results of the local government election 2018

Parties	Votes	%	Seats
Ilankai Tamil Arasu Kadchi	6,206	28.16%	9
Ahila Ilankai Thamil Congress	5,232	23.74%	7
Sri Lanka Freedom Party	5,129	23.27%	7
Tamil United Liberation Front	2,264	10.27%	7
Eelam People s Democratic Party	1,975	8.96%	3
United National Party	1,109	5.03%	2
Sri Lanka Podujana Peramuna	125	0.57%	0
Valid Votes	22,040	100.00%	38
Rejected Votes	341		
Total Polled	22,381		
Registered Electors	35,041		

The Tamil National Alliance (TNA) took over the Karaveddy Pradeshiya Sabha. Thangavelayutham Ainkaran (chairman), Kanthar Ponnaijah was elected as deputy chairman.

The first session of the Karaveddy Pradeshiya Sabha was headed by Local Commissioner, Pattic Niranjan on 2018.04.03. The Tamil National Alliance (TNA) Sri Lanka Independence Party proposed Sadanivam Ramanathan.

When asked to hold a secret ballot or a referendum, 11 ballot papers and 10 members of the secret ballot demanded a referendum.

Following a public referendum, nine members of the Tamil National Alliance and 2 United National Party members voted for Aungan Thangavelaiyat. Three members of the Eelam People's Democratic Party and seven members of the Sri Lanka Freedom Party voted Sadasivam Ramanathan.

Seven members of the Tamil National People's Front and three members of the Tamil United Liberation Front were neutral. Subsequently, the TNA chairperson Kanthar Ponniyai spoke to the Tamil National Alliance. No one else was selected as an advocate without competition.
