= Karainagar Divisional Council =

Karainagar Divisional Council காரைநகர் பிரதேச சபை

Type
- Type: Local authority

Leadership
- Chairman: Velautham Anaimugan, TNA since July 2011
- Deputy Chairman: Chandrasegaram Thurkeswaran, TNA since July 2011
- Seats: 5

Elections
- Last election: 2011 Sri Lankan local government elections

Karainagar Divisional Council (Tamil: காரைநகர் பிரதேச சபை Kārainakar Piratēca Capai; KDC) is the local authority for Karainagar DS Division in northern Sri Lanka. KDC is responsible for providing a variety of local public services including roads, sanitation, drains, housing, libraries, public parks and recreational facilities. It has 5 members elected using the open list proportional representation system. KDC is sometimes called Karativu Divisional Council.

== History ==
Karainagar Divisional Council was created with effect from 15 April 2006 from parts of Kayts Divisional Council. However, according to the pro-LTTE TamilNet, the Sri Lankan government had suspended all local government in the north and east of the country in 1983 using emergency regulations. The civil war prevented elections from being held for KDC until 2011.

On 27 January 2006 local authority elections were called for the entire country. It was later announced that elections would be held on 30 March 2006 across the entire country. The Election Commissioner subsequently postponed the elections in the north and Batticaloa District until 30 September 2006. On 23 September 2006 elections in the north and Batticaloa District were postponed until 30 June 2007.

KDC continued to be administered by special commissioners until the 2011 elections.

== Election results ==
=== 2011 local government election ===
Results of the local government election held on 23 July 2011:

Alliances and parties	Votes	%	Seats
Tamil National Alliance (EPRLF (S), ITAK, PLOTE, TELO, TULF)	1,781	40.74%	3
United People's Freedom Alliance (EPDP, SLFP et al.)	1,667	38.13%	1
United National Party	921	21.07%	1
Janatha Vimukthi Peramuna	3	0.07%	0
Valid Votes	4,372	100.00%	5
Rejected Votes	333		
Total Polled	4,705		
Registered Electors	8,140		
Turnout	57.80%		

The following candidates were elected: Velautham Anaimugan (TNA), 1,540 preference votes (pv); Veeramuthu Kannnan (UPFA), 1,393 pv; Balachanthiran Ganeshapillai (UNP), 1,240 pv; Chandrasegaram Thurkeswaran (TNA), 709 pv; and Subramaniam Yogeswaran (TNA), 376 pv.

Velautham Anaimugan (TNA) and Chandrasegaram Thurkeswaran (TNA) were appointed Chairman and Deputy Chairman respectively.
