= Raithalawela =

Raithalawela රයිතලාවෙල
- Village
- Location within Sri Lanka
- Coordinates: 7°24′12.8″N 80°39′14.2″E
- Country: Sri Lanka
- Province: Central Province
- District: Matale District
- Pradeshiya Sabha: Ukuwela Pradeshiya Sabha
- Time zone: UTC+5:30 (Sri Lanka Standard Time)

Raithalawela ( Sinhala: රයිතලාවෙල ) is a village in Sri Lanka. It is located within Central Province.

- Province - Central Province
- District - Matale
- Pradeshiya Sabha (local government) - Ukuwela

== See also ==
- List of towns in Central Province, Sri Lanka
