= P. Ariyaratnam =

Sri Lankan politician

Honourable P. Ariyaratnam MPC

Member of the Northern Provincial Council for Kilinochchi District
- Incumbent
- Assumed office 11 October 2013

Personal details
- Party: Illankai Tamil Arasu Kachchi
- Other political affiliations: Tamil National Alliance
- Profession: Civil servant
- Ethnicity: Sri Lankan Tamil

Pasupathy Ariyaratnam is a Sri Lankan Tamil civil servant, politician and provincial councillor.

Ariyaratnam was director of education for the Kilinochchi Education Zone and Mullaitivu Education Zone and Additional Provincial Director of Education for the Vanni region.

Ariyaratnam contested the 2013 provincial council election as one of the Tamil National Alliance's candidates in Kilinochchi District and was elected to the Northern Provincial Council. After the election he was appointed to assist the Chief Minister on local government. He took his oath as provincial councillor in front of Chief Minister C. V. Vigneswaran at Veerasingam Hall on 11 October 2013.
