= Pachchilaipalli Divisional Secretariat =

- Divisional Secretariat
- Interactive map of Pachchilaipalli Divisional Secretariat
- Country: Sri Lanka
- Province: Northern Province
- District: Kilinochchi
- Time zone: UTC+5:30 (Sri Lanka Standard Time)

Pachchilaipalli Divisional Secretariat is a Divisional Secretariat of Kilinochchi District, of Northern Province, Sri Lanka.

== Demography-Religion ==
Religion in Pachchilaipalli DS Division (2012)
1. Buddhist (2.80%)
2. Hindu (84.1%)
3. Muslim (0.20%)
4. Roman Catholic (11.0%)
5. Other Christian (1.90%)
6. Other (0.00%)
