= Kayts Divisional Council =

Local authority in Sri Lanka

Kayts Divisional Council ஊர்காவற்துறை பிரதேச சபை

Type
- Type: Local authority

Leadership
- Chairman: Maruthaiyinar Jeyakanthan, UPFA since July 2011
- Deputy Chairman: Paramalingam Arulkaran, UPFA since July 2011
- Seats: 5

Elections
- Last election: 2011 Sri Lankan local government elections

Kayts Divisional Council (Tamil: ஊர்காவற்துறை பிரதேச சபை Ūrkāvaṟtuṟai Piratēca Capai; KDC) is the local authority for Island North DS Division in northern Sri Lanka. KDC is responsible for providing a variety of local public services including roads, sanitation, drains, housing, libraries, public parks and recreational facilities. It has 5 members elected using the open list proportional representation system. KDC is sometimes called Island North Divisional Council.

== History ==
In 1987 there was a major re-organisation of local government in Sri Lanka. District Development Councils were abolished and replaced by Divisional Councils (Pradeshiya Sabha or Pradesha Sabhai). The Pradeshiya Sabha Act No. 15 of 1987 was passed by Parliament on 15 April 1987 and on 1 January 1988 257 Divisional Councils started functioning. The Divisional Councils were generally commensurate with their namesake Divisional Secretary's Divisions. Kays Divisional Council was established as the local authority for the Island North DS Division. However, according to the pro-LTTE TamilNet, the Sri Lankan government had suspended all local government in the north and east of the country in 1983 using emergency regulations. The civil war prevented elections from being held for KDC until 2011 as the LTTE did not hold elections when it controlled the area.

In March 1994 elections were held in the east and in Vavuniya in the north. However, elections weren't held in other areas of the north, including the Jaffna Peninsula, because most of these areas were at that time controlled by the rebel Tamil Tigers. In August 1995 the Sri Lankan military launched an offensive to recapture the Jaffna Peninsula. By December 1995 the military had captured most of the Valikamam region of the peninsula, including the city of Jaffna. By 16 May 1996 the military had recaptured the entire peninsula. In late 1996 the government announced elections would be held for 23 local authorities in Jaffna District, Kilinochchi District, Mannar District and Vavuniya District but following opposition from Tamil political parties postponed them. On 3 December 1997 the government announced that elections would be held for the 17 local authorities on the Jaffna Peninsula. The Tamil political parties were still opposed to holding elections as "normalcy" hadn't returned to the peninsula. The peninsula was under the firm grip of the Sri Lankan military and civil government had little, if any, role in the administration of the peninsula. The Tamil Tigers were also firmly against the elections being held. Despite these objections the elections were held on 29 January 1998.

== Election results ==
=== 1998 local government election ===
Results of the local government election held on 29 January 1998:

Alliances and parties	Votes	%	Seats
Eelam People's Democratic Party	2,771	72.43%	9
Democratic People's Liberation Front (PLOTE)	536	14.01%	1
Independent (EPDP)	411	10.74%	1
Tamil Eelam Liberation Organization	57	1.49%	0
Eelam People's Revolutionary Liberation Front	51	1.33%	0
Valid Votes	3,826	100.00%	11
Rejected Votes	269		
Total Polled	4,095		
Registered Electors	30,340		
Turnout	13.50%		

On 1 January 2002 local authority elections were called for the entire country. It was later announced that elections would be held on 25 March 2002 in the north and east, and on 20 March 2002 in the rest of the country. The normal life term of Sri Lankan local government bodies is four years. The life term of KDC expired in February 2002 but the central government extended this by another year, as the law allows. On 21 March 2002 the Election Commissioner announced that the elections in the north and east, except for eight local authorities in Ampara District, had been postponed until 25 September 2002. On 17 September 2002 elections in the north and east were postponed, for a second time, until 25 June 2003. Elections should have been held when the extension expired in February 2003 but in January 2003, following a request from the Tamil National Alliance, the central government instead dissolved KDC using emergency powers and instead put in place special commissioners to administer the local area. In June 2003 elections in the north and east were postponed, for a third time, until 24 January 2004. In January 2004 elections in the north and east, except for local authorities in Ampara District, were postponed, for a fourth time, until 23 October 2004.

On 27 January 2006 local authority elections were called for the entire country. It was later announced that elections would be held on 30 March 2006 across the entire country. The Election Commissioner subsequently postponed the elections in the north and Batticaloa District until 30 September 2006. On 23 September 2006 elections in the north and Batticaloa District were postponed until 30 June 2007.

KDC continued to be administered by special commissioners until the 2011 elections.

=== 2011 local government election ===
Results of the local government election held on 23 July 2011:

Alliances and parties	Votes	%	Seats
United People's Freedom Alliance (EPDP, SLFP et al.)	2,833	77.45%	4
Tamil National Alliance (EPRLF (S), ITAK, PLOTE, TELO, TULF)	805	22.01%	1
United National Party	20	0.55%	0
Valid Votes	3,658	100.00%	9
Rejected Votes	340		
Total Polled	3,998		
Registered Electors	6,349		
Turnout	62.97%		

The following candidates were elected: Maruthaiyinar Jeyakanthan (UPFA), 2,663 preference votes (pv); Paramalingam Arulkaran (UPFA), 1,067 pv; Kanthagnani Katheessan (UPFA), 984 pv; Manuel Fernando Felix Alberd (UPFA), 949 pv; and Ramalingam Puvaneswaran (TNA), 375 pv.

Maruthaiyinar Jeyakanthan (UPFA) and Paramalingam Arulkaran (UPFA) were appointed Chairman and Deputy Chairman respectively.
