= Delft Divisional Council =

Local authority in Sri Lanka

Delft Divisional Council நெடுந்தீவு பிரதேச சபை

Type
- Type: Local authority

Leadership
- Chairman: Daniel Rechchiyan, UPFA since July 2011
- Deputy Chairman: Subramaniam Kobalasingam, UPFA since July 2011
- Seats: 9

Elections
- Last election: 2011 Sri Lankan local government elections

Delft Divisional Council (Tamil: நெடுந்தீவு பிரதேச சபை Neṭuntīvu Piratēca Capai; DDC) is the local authority for Delft DS Division in northern Sri Lanka. DDC is responsible for providing a variety of local public services including roads, sanitation, drains, housing, libraries, public parks and recreational facilities. It has 9 members elected using the open list proportional representation system. DDC is sometimes called Neduntivu Divisional Council.

== History ==
In 1987 there was a major re-organisation of local government in Sri Lanka. District Development Councils were abolished and replaced by Divisional Councils (Pradeshiya Sabha or Pradesha Sabhai). The Pradeshiya Sabha Act No. 15 of 1987 was passed by Parliament on 15 April 1987 and on 1 January 1988 257 Divisional Councils started functioning. The Divisional Councils were generally commensurate with their namesake Divisional Secretary's Divisions. Delft Divisional Council was established as the local authority for the Delft DS Division. However, according to the pro-LTTE TamilNet, the Sri Lankan government had suspended all local government in the north and east of the country in 1983 using emergency regulations. The civil war prevented elections from being held for DDC until 1998 as the LTTE did not hold elections when it controlled the area.

In March 1994 elections were held in the east and in Vavuniya in the north. However, elections weren't held in other areas of the north, including the Jaffna Peninsula, because most of these areas were at that time controlled by the rebel Tamil Tigers. In August 1995 the Sri Lankan military launched an offensive to recapture the Jaffna Peninsula. By December 1995 the military had captured most of the Valikamam region of the peninsula, including the city of Jaffna. By 16 May 1996 the military had recaptured the entire peninsula. In late 1996 the government announced elections would be held for 23 local authorities in Jaffna District, Kilinochchi District, Mannar District and Vavuniya District but following opposition from Tamil political parties postponed them. On 3 December 1997 the government announced that elections would be held for the 17 local authorities on the Jaffna Peninsula. The Tamil political parties were still opposed to holding elections as "normalcy" hadn't returned to the peninsula. The peninsula was under the firm grip of the Sri Lankan military and civil government had little, if any, role in the administration of the peninsula. The Tamil Tigers were also firmly against the elections being held. Despite these objections the elections were held on 29 January 1998.

== Election results ==
=== 1998 local government election ===
Results of the local government election held on 29 January 1998:

Alliances and parties	Votes	%	Seats
Eelam People's Democratic Party	1,484	82.44%	8
Democratic People's Liberation Front (PLOTE)	293	16.28%	1
Eelam People's Revolutionary Liberation Front	13	0.72%	0
Tamil Eelam Liberation Organization	10	0.56%	0
Valid Votes	1,800	100.00%	9
Rejected Votes	125		
Total Polled	1,925		
Registered Electors	4,209		
Turnout	45.74%		

On 1 January 2002 local authority elections were called for the entire country. It was later announced that elections would be held on 25 March 2002 in the north and east, and on 20 March 2002 in the rest of the country. The normal life term of Sri Lankan local government bodies is four years. The life term of DDC expired in February 2002 but the central government extended this by another year, as the law allows. On 21 March 2002 the Election Commissioner announced that the elections in the north and east, except for eight local authorities in Ampara District, had been postponed until 25 September 2002. On 17 September 2002 elections in the north and east were postponed, for a second time, until 25 June 2003. Elections should have been held when the extension expired in February 2003 but in January 2003, following a request from the Tamil National Alliance, the central government instead dissolved DDC using emergency powers and instead put in place special commissioners to administer the local area. In June 2003 elections in the north and east were postponed, for a third time, until 24 January 2004. In January 2004 elections in the north and east, except for local authorities in Ampara District, were postponed, for a fourth time, until 23 October 2004.

On 27 January 2006 local authority elections were called for the entire country. It was later announced that elections would be held on 30 March 2006 across the entire country. The Election Commissioner subsequently postponed the elections in the north and Batticaloa District until 30 September 2006. On 23 September 2006 elections in the north and Batticaloa District were postponed until 30 June 2007.

DDC continued to be administered by special commissioners until the 2011 elections.

=== 2011 local government election ===
Results of the local government election held on 23 July 2011:

Alliances and parties	Votes	%	Seats
United People's Freedom Alliance (EPDP, SLFP et al.)	1,609	84.33%	8
Tamil National Alliance (EPRLF (S), ITAK, PLOTE, TELO, TULF)	216	11.32%	1
United National Party	83	4.35%	0
Valid Votes	1,908	100.00%	9
Rejected Votes	102		
Total Polled	2,010		
Registered Electors	3,085		
Turnout	65.15%		

The following candidates were elected: Daniel Rechchiyan (UPFA), 999 preference votes (pv); Subramaniam Kobalasingam (UPFA), 631 pv; Sebasthi Pethuru Arulappu (UPFA), 627 pv; Mariyasebastiyampillai Amaladorin (UPFA), 376 pv; Sinnappu Edwardrasa (UPFA), 355 pv; Kumarasamy Sivananthan (UPFA), 346 pv; Jayakkuddy Mayilvaganam (UPFA), 261 pv; Laithas Yogarasa Lorance (UPFA), 210 pv; and Appukkuddy Anthonipillai (TNA), 88 pv.

Daniel Rechchiyan (UPFA) and Subramaniam Kobalasingam (UPFA) were appointed chairman and deputy chairman respectively.
