= Kandavalai Divisional Secretariat =

Kandavalai Divisional Secretariat Kandawalai Kandawalai AGA office
- Divisional Secretariat
- Nickname: velikkandal junction
- Country: Sri Lanka
- Province: Northern Province
- District: Kilinochchi District
- Time zone: UTC+5:30 (Sri Lanka Standard Time)

Kandavalai Divisional Secretariat is a Divisional Secretariat of Kilinochchi District, of Northern Province, Sri Lanka.

== Demography-Religion ==
Religion in Kandavalai DS Division (2012)
1. Buddhist (0.50%)
2. Hindu (88.4%)
3. Muslim (0.10%)
4. Roman Catholic (6.40%)
5. Other Christian (4.60%)
6. Other (0.00%)
