= Vadamaradchi East Divisional Secretariat =

- Divisional Secretariat
- Interactive map of Vadamaradchi East Divisional Secretariat
- Country: Sri Lanka
- Province: Northern Province
- District: Jaffna District
- Time zone: UTC+5:30 (Sri Lanka Standard Time)

Vadamaradchi East Divisional Secretariat is a Divisional Secretariat of Jaffna District, of Northern Province, Sri Lanka.

== Demography-Religion ==
Religion in Vadamaradchi East DS Division (2012)
1. Buddhist (0.10%)
2. Hindu (68.5%)
3. Muslim (0.10%)
4. Roman Catholic (29.4%)
5. Other Christian (1.90%)
6. Other (0.00%)
