= Poonakary Divisional Secretariat =

- Divisional Secretariat
- Interactive map of Poonakary Divisional Secretariat
- Country: Sri Lanka
- Province: Northern Province
- District: Kilinochchi District
- Time zone: UTC+5:30 (Sri Lanka Standard Time)

Poonakary Divisional Secretariat is a Divisional Secretariat of Kilinochchi District, of Northern Province, Sri Lanka.

== Demography-Religion ==
Religion in Poonakary DS Division (2012)
1. Buddhist (0.90%)
2. Hindu (70.0%)
3. Muslim (2.30%)
4. Roman Catholic (22.8%)
5. Other Christian (3.90%)
6. Other (0.10%)
