= Vadamaradchi North Divisional Secretariat =

- Divisional Secretariat
- Country: Sri Lanka
- Province: Northern Province
- District: Jaffna District
- Time zone: UTC+5:30 (Sri Lanka Standard Time)

Vadamaradchi North Divisional Secretariat is a Divisional Secretariat of Jaffna District, of Northern Province, Sri Lanka.

== Demography-Religion ==
Religion in Vadamaradchi North DS Division (2012)
1. Buddhist (0.50%)
2. Hindu (83.9%)
3. Muslim (0.10%)
4. Roman Catholic (13.4%)
5. Other Christian (2.10%)
6. Other (0.00%)
