= Vadamaradchi South-West Divisional Secretariat =

- Divisional Secretariat
- Country: Sri Lanka
- Province: Northern Province
- District: Jaffna District
- Time zone: UTC+5:30 (Sri Lanka Standard Time)
- Website: www.vadamaradchisw.ds.gov.lk

Vadamaradchi South-West Divisional Secretariat is a Divisional Secretariat of Jaffna District, of Northern Province, Sri Lanka.

== Demography-Religion ==
Religion in Vadamaradchi South-West DS Division (2012)
1. Buddhist (0.20%)
2. Hindu (95.9%)
3. Muslim (0.00%)
4. Roman Catholic (2.50%)
5. Other Christian (1.30%)
6. Other (0.00%)
