= Karachchi Divisional Secretariat =

- Divisional Secretariat
- Interactive map of Karachchi Divisional Secretariat
- Country: Sri Lanka
- Province: Northern Province
- District: Kilinochchi
- Time zone: UTC+5:30 (Sri Lanka Standard Time)

Karachchi Divisional Secretariat is a Divisional Secretariat of Kilinochchi District, of Northern Province, Sri Lanka. It has a population of 61,484 (2012).

== Demography-Religion ==
Religion in Karachchi DS Division (2012)
1. Buddhist (1.20%)
2. Hindu (83.1%)
3. Muslim (0.30%)
4. Roman Catholic (8.20%)
5. Other Christian (7.20%)
6. Other (0.00%)
