= Kilinochchi District =

Kilinochchi District கிளிநொச்சி மாவட்டம் කිලිනොච්චි දිස්ත්‍රික්කය
- Administrative District
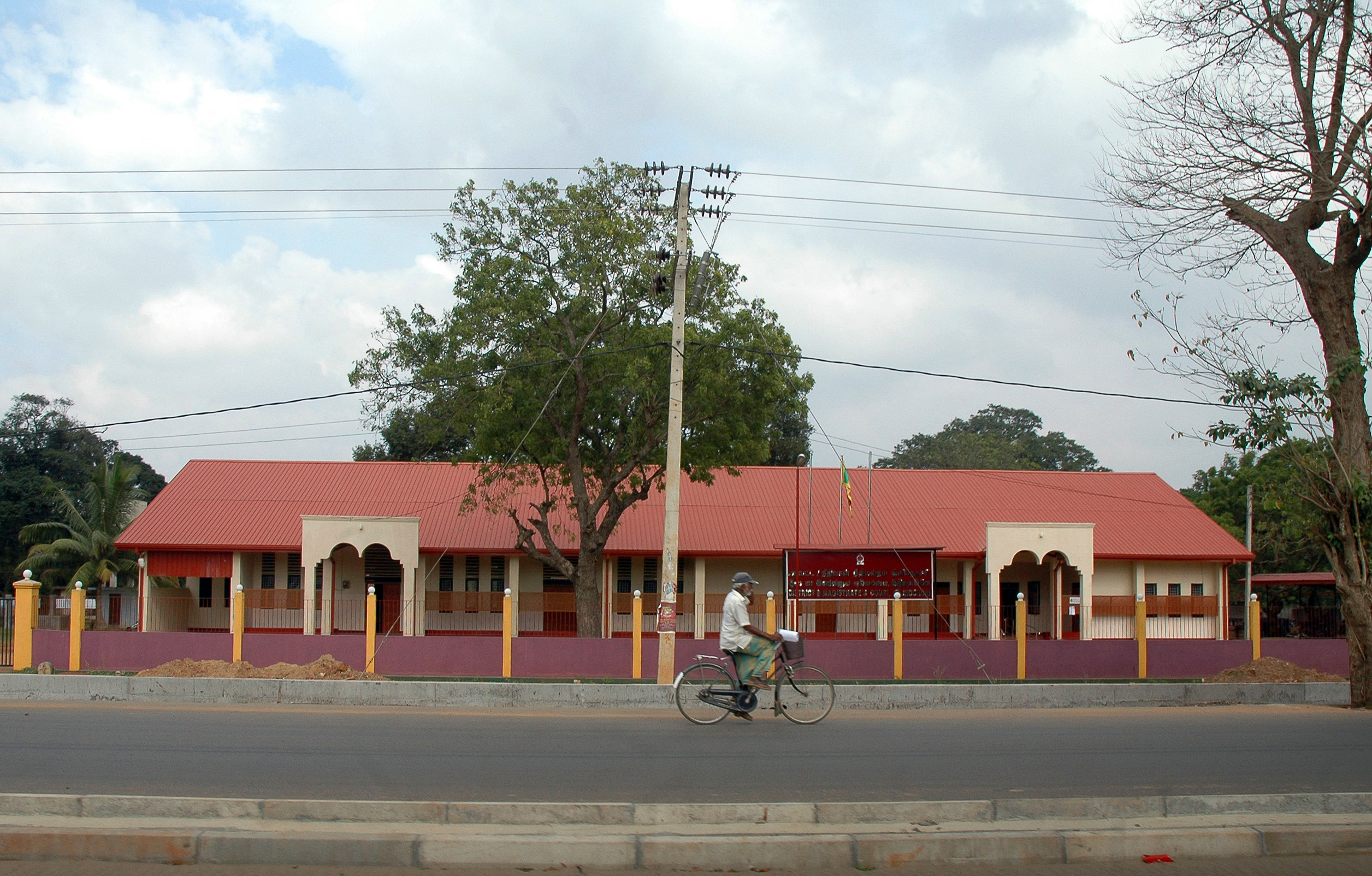
- Kilinochchi District & Magistrate’s Court

- Location within Sri Lanka
- Coordinates: 09°25′N 80°25′E
- Country: Sri Lanka
- Province: Northern
- Created: February 1984
- Capital: Kilinochchi
- DS Division: List: Kandavalai; Karachchi; Pachchilaipalli; Poonakary

Government
  - District Secretary: R. Ketheeswaran
  - MPs: List: Silvestri Alantine; Murugesu Chandrakumar; Douglas Devananda; Vijayakala Maheswaran; Suresh Premachandran; E. Saravanapavan; Mavai Senathirajah; S. Sritharan; A. Vinayagamoorthy
  - MPCs: List: P. Ariyaratnam; T. Kurukularajah; S. Pasupathipillai; V. Thavanathan

Area
  - Total: 1,279 km^{2} (494 sq mi)
  - Land: 1,205 km^{2} (465 sq mi)
  - Water: 74 km^{2} (29 sq mi) 5.79%
  - Rank: 23rd (1.95% of total area)

Population (2012 census)
  - Total: 112,875
  - Rank: 23rd (0.56% of total pop.)
  - Density: 93.67/km^{2} (242.6/sq mi)

Ethnicity (2012 census)
  - Sri Lankan Tamil: 109,528 (97.03%)
  - Indian Tamil: 1,682 (1.49%)
  - Sinhalese: 962 (0.85%)
  - Sri Lankan Moors: 678 (0.60%)
  - Other: 25 (0.02%)

Religion (2012 census)
  - Hindu: 93,084 (82.47%)
  - Christian: 18,118 (16.05%)
  - Buddhist: 945 (0.84%)
  - Muslim: 678 (0.60%)
  - Other: 50 (0.04%)
- Time zone: UTC+05:30 (Sri Lanka)
- ISO 3166 code: LK-42
- Vehicle registration: NP
- Official Languages: Tamil, Sinhala
- Website: Kilinochchi District Secretariat

Kilinochchi District (Tamil: கிளிநொச்சி மாவட்டம் Kiḷinocci Māvaṭṭam; Sinhala: කිලිනොච්චි දිස්ත්‍රික්කය) is one of the 25 districts of Sri Lanka, the second level administrative division of the country. The district is administered by a District Secretariat headed by a District Secretary (previously known as a Government Agent) appointed by the central government of Sri Lanka. The capital of the district is the town of Kilinochchi.

== History ==
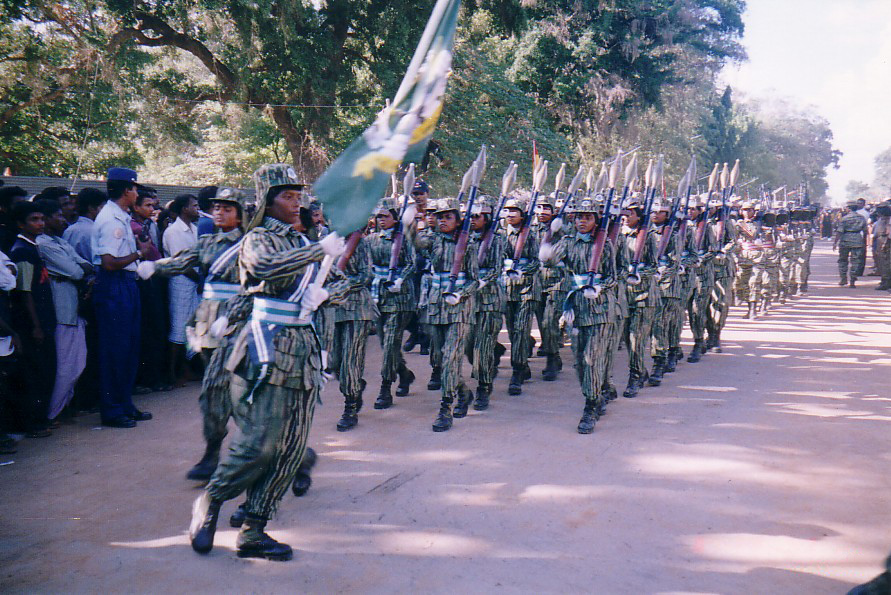
A LTTE parade in Killinochchi, 2002

Between 5th century BC and 13th century AD present day Kilinochchi District was part of Rajarata. Much of Kilinochchi District was thereafter part of the pre-colonial Jaffna kingdom. The district then came under Portuguese, Dutch and British control. In 1815 the British gained control of the entire island of Ceylon. They divided the island into three ethnic based administrative structures: Low Country Sinhalese, Kandyan Sinhalese and Tamil. The district, which was then part of Jaffna District, was part of the Tamil administration. In 1833, in accordance with the recommendations of the Colebrooke-Cameron Commission, the ethnic based administrative structures were unified into a single administration divided into five geographic provinces. Jaffna District, together with Mannar District and Vanni District, formed the new Northern Province.

The district was colonised in 1936 by residents from Jaffna Peninsula as part of a scheme that sought to ease overpopulation and unemployment. At the time that Ceylon gained independence, Jaffna was one of the three districts located in the Northern Province. Parts of Jaffna District were transferred to newly created Mullaitivu District in September 1978. Kilinochchi District was carved out of the southern part of Jaffna District in February 1984.

Kilinochchi District was under the control of rebel Liberation Tigers of Tamil Eelam for many years during the civil war. The district was recaptured by the Sri Lankan military in late 2008/early 2009.

== Geography ==
Kilinochchi District is located in the north of Sri Lanka in the Northern Province. It has an area of 1,279 square kilometres (494 sq mi).

== Administrative units ==
Kilinochchi District is divided into 4 Divisional Secretary's Division (DS Divisions), each headed by a Divisional Secretary (previously known as an Assistant Government Agent). The DS Divisions are further sub-divided into 95 Grama Niladhari Divisions (GN Divisions).

DS Division	Main Town	Divisional Secretary	GN Divisions	Area (km^{2})	Population (2012 Census)						Population Density (/km^{2})
DS Division	Main Town	Divisional Secretary	GN Divisions	Area (km^{2})	Sri Lankan Tamil	Indian Tamil	Sinhalese	Sri Lankan Moors	Other	Total	Population Density (/km^{2})
Kandavalai	Kandavalai	T. Mugunthan	16	318	22,920	7	58	17	1	23,003	72
Karachchi	Kilinochchi	G. Nageswaran	42	358	58,901	1,501	533	178	24	61,137	171
Pachchilaipalli	Pallai	Sivapathasundram Sathiyaseelan	18	164	8,274	6	222	8	0	8,510	52
Poonakary	Poonakary	K. S. Vasanthakumar	19	439	19,433	168	149	475	0	20,225	46
Total			95	1,279	109,528	1,682	962	678	25	112,875	88

== Demographics ==
=== Population ===
Kilinochchi District's population was 112,875 in 2011. The population of the district is almost exclusively Sri Lankan Tamil.

The population of the district, like the rest of the north and east of Sri Lanka, has been heavily affected by the civil war. The war killed an estimated 100,000 people. Several hundred thousand Sri Lankan Tamils, possibly as much as one million, emigrated to the West during the war. Many Sri Lankan Tamils also moved to the relative safety of the capital Colombo. Most of the Sri Lankan Moors and Sinhalese who lived in the district fled to other parts of Sri Lanka or were forcibly expelled by the rebel Liberation Tigers of Tamil Eelam.

=== Ethnicity ===
Population of Kilinochchi District by ethnic group 1981 to 2012
Year	Tamil (Note: Sri Lankan Tamil and Indian Tamil.)		Sinhalese		Muslim (Note: Sri Lankan Moors and Indian Moors.)		Other		Total No.
Year	No.	%	No.	%	No.	%	No.	%	Total No.
1981 Census	89,197	97.33%	741	0.81%	1,567	1.71%	136	0.15%	91,641
1999 Estimate	n/a	n/a	n/a	n/a	n/a	n/a	n/a	n/a	156,428
2000 Estimate (Note: 2001 Census was not carried out in Kilinochchi District.)	n/a	n/a	n/a	n/a	n/a	n/a	n/a	n/a	154,015
2001 Estimate	n/a	n/a	n/a	n/a	n/a	n/a	n/a	n/a	148,052
2002 Estimate	n/a	n/a	n/a	n/a	n/a	n/a	n/a	n/a	153,721
2003 Estimate	n/a	n/a	n/a	n/a	n/a	n/a	n/a	n/a	140,145
2004 Estimate	n/a	n/a	n/a	n/a	n/a	n/a	n/a	n/a	140,920
2005 Estimate	165,781	99.77%	2	0.00%	383	0.23%	0	0.00%	166,166
2006 Estimate	196,611	99.78%	2	0.00%	424	0.22%	0	0.00%	197,037
2007 Estimate	195,386	99.78%	2	0.00%	424	0.22%	0	0.00%	195,812
2008 Estimate	190,599	99.78%	2	0.00%	424	0.22%	0	0.00%	191,025
2009 Estimate	22,099	93.54%	1	0.00%	1,525	6.46%	0	0.00%	23,625
2011 Enumeration	102,779	99.10%	138	0.13%	774	0.75%	26	0.03%	103,717
2012 Census	111,210	98.52%	962	0.85%	678	0.60%	25	0.02%	112,875

=== Religion ===
There are 92,986 Hindus in Kilinochchi District.Also 18,499 Christians, 1275 Buddhists, 700 Muslims and 50 Other Religious people in Kilinochchi District

=== Poverty ===
In 2016 the district was the poorest in Sri Lanka and had the highest incidence of extreme poverty according to the World Bank.

Religion in Kilinochchi District (2011)
1. Hinduism (82.5%)
2. Christianity (16.1%)
3. Buddhism (0.80%)
4. Islam (0.60%)

== Politics and government ==
=== Local government ===
Kilinochchi District has three local authorities all of which are Divisional Councils (Pradesha Sabhai or Pradeshiya Sabha).

Local Authority	Area (km^{2})	Population (2011)	Registered Electors (2011)	Elected Members (2011)		
Local Authority	Area (km^{2})	Population (2011)	Registered Electors (2011)	TNA (Note: Includes TULF.)	UPFA	Total
Karachchi Divisional Council	620.66	76,770	42,800	15	4	19
Pachchilaipalli Divisional Council	167.70	7,641	7,116	6	3	9
Poonakary Divisional Council	478.73	19,306	11,301	6	4	10
Total	1,267.09	103,717	61,217	27	11	38
