= List of settlements in Eastern Province (Sri Lanka) =

Eastern Province is a province of Sri Lanka, containing the Ampara District, Batticaloa District, and Trincomalee District. The following is a list of settlements in the province.

== A ==
- Addalaichenai
- Akkaraipattu
- Ampara
- Ampilanthurai
- Arayampathy

== B ==
- Batticaloa

== C ==
- Central camp
- chenkalady

== D ==
- Divulapothana

== E ==
- Eruvil
- Eravur

== K ==
- Kalmunai
- Karaitivu
- Kanchikudicharu
- Kokkaddicholai
- Kaluwanchikudy
- Kathiraveli
- Kattankudy
- Kantale

== L ==
- Lahugala

== M ==
- Mandur
- Maruthamunai

== N ==
- Navithanveli
- Nintavur

== O ==
- Oluvil
- Oddamavadi

== P ==
- Pottuvil
- Pandiruppu
- Paddipalai
- Pasikudah

== R ==
- Ranamadu

== S ==
- Sammanthurai
- Sainthamaruthu
- Santhiveli
- Sangaman Kanda
- Saththurukondan

== T ==
- Taigahahinna
- Thalankudah
- Thalavai
- Thamaraikerni
- Thamaravillu
- Thambiluvil
- Thamaraikulam
- Thampaddai
- Tampalakamam
- Thampalawattai
- Thandiyadi
- Thannamunai
- Tannipalai
- Tembichchiya
- Thennamaravadi
- Tettativu
- Thalayadimadu
- Thaddumunai
- Thiaveddavan
- Thikkodai
- Thikkoddaimunmari
- Thimilatheevu
- Thiraymadu
- Thirukkovil
- Thirukkaikuda
- Thuraineelavanai
- Thukkuvittan
- Thumpalancholai
- Trincomalee

== U ==
- Uhana
- Udumpankulam
- Unnichchai
- Uppodai
- Uppukkachchimadu
- Uppuveli
- Urani(Batticaloa)
- Urachery
- Uriyankaddu
- Urukamam
- Uthuchchenai

== V ==
- Vaddavan
- Vettilaipoddamadu
- Vaddipoddamadu
- Vaikaladichchenai
- Vakaneri
- Vakantonai
- Vakarai
- Valaichchenai
- Valaiyiravu
- Valaitoddam
- Vammivattavan
- Vammiyadiyuttu
- Vantharumoolai
- Vannameddutidal
- Vannatital
- Vathakkalmadu
- Vattalaikodichchenai
- Vavunatheevu
- Vayiriuttu
- Vedakudiyiruppu
- Vedativu
- Veddukkadduveli
- Veechukalmunai
- Veeradiya
- Veeramunai
- Vellaimanal
- Vellaiyadimadu
- Vellamachchenai
- Vellaveli
- Veppadithurai
- Veppankuda
- Veranativu
- Verukal
- Vettimakkalkudiyiruppu
- Vinayagapuram, Sri Lanka
- Vilavedduvan
- Viliraiyadippuval
- Verugal Malai

== See also ==
- List of cities in Sri Lanka
- List of towns in Sri Lanka
