= Jihad (militant group) =

Islamist-Jihadist Sri Lankan militant organisation

- Other name: Osama Front
- Leader: Abdul Hakeem †
- Dates active: 12 April 1985 – 21 February 2008
- Active regions: Mutur, Kinniya, Thoppur, Oddamavadi, Eravur, Kattankudy, and Akkaraipattu
- Ideology: Jihadism
- Status: Disbanded

The Jihad militant organization was an armed Muslim organization active in parts of eastern and northern Sri Lanka during the Sri Lankan civil war. Reports published between 1985 and 2006 described Jihad as a government-backed organization, and a militant group opposed to the Liberation Tigers of Tamil Eelam (LTTE). The organization was accused by Tamil media of involvement in attacks, abductions, killings, property destruction, and intimidation directed primarily at Tamil civilians.

The name "Jihad" is an Arabic term, that the Sri Lankan magazine Al-Islam interpreted as meaning "Holy War". The magazine used the term in connection with a proposal to launch "Holy War" against the LTTE. Uthayan reported the claims made by Al-Islam magazine concerning a proposal by Muslim Congress leader M. H. M. Ashraff to establish Jihad as a "Holy War" against the LTTE. The article stated that the magazine claimed majority support amongst Muslims for Ashraff’s proposal.

Jihad operated through a decentralised structure in which each district was controlled by a separate head. These local leaders worked independently and were expected not to interfere in one another’s areas, while maintaining links with military intelligence. The group was supplied with training and weapons by military intelligence, with the weapons transported from Colombo in vehicles belonging to cabinet ministers. Jihad’s former leader, Abdul Hakeem, was shot dead in September 2005 and his killing was publicly linked to business rivalry and internal disputes within the Muslim community.

== History ==
The attack on Tamil civilians in Karativu on the Tamil New Year of 1985 was carried out jointly by the Jihad group members and the Special Task Force. Tamil residents travelling through Maalikaikadhu from Karativu to Kalmunai on the morning of 12th April, 1985 were beaten by Jihad and STF members, while a later attack on April 14 1985 was marked by grenade blasts and the absence of police.

According to the report on 13 April 1985, as people were preparing to leave the schools, gunfire broke out. This suggested that members of the Jihad group had returned and were causing destruction in the other parts of Karativu that they had been unable to attack on the previous evening. One group entered from the north along the Kalmunai-Pottuvil trunk road, while another group approached from the northeast near Sithanai Kutty Swami Temple. Initially, the Jihad group appeared hesitant to launch an attack and moved cautiously. Once they confirmed that no Tamil militants were present, they attacked temples, homes, and shops, looting and setting property on fire.

Upon reaching, Mylvaganam Lane, the third group detonated a grenade before looting the houses and shops. Since residents had left the previous day, the group was able to loot the buildings without being challenged. After ransacking the properties, the attackers set fire to the buildings. The flames destroyed valuables that had been passed down through generations. The attackers also set fire to 450,000 bushels of paddy from the Maha harvest, rather than leave it behind, as they could not transport the 150,000 bags. Four residents who remained in their homes: N. Arulanandam, T. Perinpa-moorthy, V. Thangavadivel, and K. Kasidurai were killed as a result of the violence.

According to a report published on 22 January 1987, the Jihad group operated with government support and was active among Muslim communities in Mannar, Ampara and Batticaloa. The group was supplied with weapons and training by the Sri Lankan government and instructed to capture Tamil militants. The Jihad group contributed to unrest in several areas of the Eastern Province. Following requests from local Muslims, Jihad was temporarily dissolved in Batticaloa and Akkaraipattu and then later banned in Erukkalampiddy, Mannar District by EROS.

According to the testimony of the former member arrested by EROS, the group initially sought to combat crime and activities it considered violations of Islamic law, including robbery, gambling, alcohol consumption, and public disorder. He also stated the Sri Lankan government utilized the group to encourage ethnic divisions between Hindu and Muslim communities. He blamed the Jihad group for major ethnic violence in Batticaloa but claimed that the Mannar branch did not act against Tamil militants despite government orders.

Uthayan reported on 21 January 1994 that police had seized a large quantity of weapons and related items from the home of a Muslim man in Valaichchenai who was suspected of being a member of the Jihad group. The seized items included ammunition, explosives, walkie-talkies, grenades, and police insignia, some of which had been buried around the house.

In 2006, the Sri Lankan government planned to establish a dedicated Muslim unit within the Sri Lanka Army, which the LTTE described as an official version of the "Jihad" paramilitary group. The proposed unit lent credence to long-standing allegations made by the LTTE and its chief negotiator Anton Balasingham that a Muslim paramilitary group known as the Jihad group operated in eastern Sri Lanka with support from Pakistani military intelligence. The All Ceylon Muslim Council opposed the creation of a separate Muslim unit within the Sri Lanka Army, calling it unnecessary. Its Secretary, M.F. Mohideen, sent a letter to President Mahinda urging the government to halt the initiative. The council argued that Muslims should live alongside people of all faiths throughout Sri Lanka.

== Involvement in Violence ==
Jihad was frequently mentioned in reports concerning intercommunal violence in eastern Sri Lanka during. The attacks attributed to Jihad included:

- On 24 June 1990, reports attributed the deaths of 75 Tamils in Kalmunai to Jihad members and Sri Lankan Army personnel, stating that the victims had been lined up and shot.
- On 27 June 1990, Jihad members assisted security forces during arrests of 100 Tamils who had taken refuge in Kalmunai and Maruthamunai.
- On 8 July 1990, reports emerged that individuals belonging to the Jihad group attacked Tamil people in Silavathurai area of Mannar District, while blaming the Tamil community for local unrest. There were also reports of the looting of Tamil-owned property.
- On 10 July 1990, the Jihad organization, acting alongside the army looted and burned 25 Tamil homes, 2 shops, and a temple in Senaikudiyiruppu, Ampara.
- It was reported on 10 July 1990, armed groups separate from the regular military were operating in Batticaloa and Ampara, attacking Tamil civilians, burning bodies using tires, and abducting or killing hundreds whose whereabouts were unknown. The report identifies many Muslim youths affiliated with the Jihad organization as members of these groups. It further claims that these groups acted with the backing of government forces, entered areas after military attacks.
- On 15^{th} July 1990, Shanmugam who was a native of Kalmunai, was shot dead by members of the Jihad group.
- On 19 July 1990, Three Tamil civilians were killed near Navithanveli while on their way to their fields by members of the Jihad organization. According to the report, the victims are Karuvalthambi (from Savalakkadai), Ananthan (from Savalakkadai), and Pushparaja (from Navithanveli).
- It was reported on 26 July 1990, members of the Jihad group were murdering Tamil civilians and Muslim elders who had publicly supported the Liberation Tigers of Tamil Eelam (LTTE). A 45-year-old trader, I. Ibrahim, who fled the area surrounding Trincomalee town and travelled through the forests to reach the North, stated on the 7th July 1990, the group surrounded his home because he had recently expressed patriotic views. He witnessed his neighbor being tortured before managing to escape. The Jihad members then set fire to his house and large stock of merchandise. He further stated that individuals operating under the Jihad banner attacked and looted local residents, including his relatives, with the protection of the Sri Lankan Army.
- On 30 July 1990, Fifteen Tamil refugees were hacked to death from a camp in the Pottuvil area by members of the Jihad group.
- It was reported on 23 September 1990, 54 Tamils, including women and children, were killed in two incidents in Batticaloa District on the preceding Thursday and Friday. It reports that the Islamic militant organization killed 19 Tamils, including six women, in Pudukudiyiruppu, Thalanguda, and Kannanguda. However, the Sri Lankan Defence Ministry reported a lower figure of 12 deaths and 10 injuries, describing the incident as a clash between Tamils and Muslims. All Indian radio, citing official sources, reported that 20 extremists entered the villages on Friday night, abducted Tamil residents, and later killed them on the seashore.
- It was reported on 20 April 1994, the Eravur Police arrested 2 individuals suspected of attempting to shoot and kill the Chairman of the Eravur Pradeshiya Sabha. Weapons were recovered during the arrests, and the 2 suspects were said to belong to the Jihad group.
- On 31 October 2004, 500 people organized under the name “Jihad” to set fire to the Meditation Centre in Kattankudy, destroying its library, and damaged Sufi-owned homes and businesses. The financial loss was significant. A Sufi Muslim was shot dead and another was wounded by gunfire. Eight perpetrators were arrested and released on bail with no further consequences.
- Jihad members obstructed a 2008 Supreme Court order allowing 200 members of the Sufi order (All Ceylon Thareekathul Mufliheen) to return to their homes in Kattankudy and practice their beliefs.

== Relationship with Pakistan and LTTE Geneva Report ==
On 12 March 2006, Virakesari reported that the Jihad group was operating as a separate armed unit in parts of Trincomalee District under the direct supervision of intelligence officers from the Sri Lankan armed forces. Citing diplomatic sources, the article stated that the LTTE had presented a dossier during talks held in Geneva concerning five major Sri Lankan paramilitary organizations, including the Jihad group.

The report stated that prominent Jihad members had been taken to Pakistan under the pretext of receiving Islamic religious education and had received weapons training at camps operated by Lashkar-e-Taiba in mountainous areas of Pakistan.

It also claimed that a senior Pakistani intelligence officer, who later served as a diplomat, had organized the training. The report linked the diplomat to the deployment of Pakistani intelligence personnel to the Jaffna Peninsula and to arrangements concerning a planned visit to Pakistan by President Mahinda Rajapaksa. It further stated that the diplomat had previously served in London and had been brought to Sri Lanka during Chandrika Kumaratunga’s administration through Rajapaksa’s influence.

The report identified Noordeen Nizam, Noordeen Sharom, Basheen Sharom, and Gunesh Najeem as leaders of the group operating in Trincomalee. It stated that similar groups had operated in Mutur, Kinniya, Thoppur, Oddamavadi, Eravur, Kattankudy, and Akkaraipattu. These groups were involved in clashes, grenade attacks, shootings, threats, and intimidation.

In an article published in Outlook magazine in 2004, B. Raman, a former Indian intelligence official, stated that there were reports of radicalization occurring among some Tamil-speaking Muslim youth in Sri Lanka’s Eastern Province. He further stated that Lashkar-e-Taiba (LeT) had shown interest in promoting 'Jihad' among the Muslim community in that region. He cited reports regarding the activities of a group known as the "Osama Brigade" during communal clashes in the Eastern Province in 2002, as well as the arrest by the Tamil Nadu Police of members of a local organization called the "Muslim Defence Force," who had reportedly planned to hold meetings with the LeT in eastern Sri Lanka. Additionally, he noted that "Colombo serves as a convenient transit point for Indians collaborating with the ISI to travel secretly to Karachi via Pakistan International Airlines flights, without any travel records appearing in their passports."

On 19 March 2006, Thinakural reported the Jihad group distributed leaflets in Oddamavadi and Eravur demanding the closure of video shops and warning residents against gambling and alcohol consumption. The group opened fire on gamblers in 2005 and threatened businesses in Eravur, Oddamavadi, and Valaichchenai. The article also linked the group to Tamil and Muslim clashes in Akkaraipattu, Ampara District in 1985 and 1990.

== See also ==
- Paramilitary organisations based in Sri Lanka
