= List of settlements in Sri Lanka =

The following is a list of settlements in Sri Lanka.

- List of settlements in Central Province, Sri Lanka
- List of settlements in Eastern Province, Sri Lanka
- List of settlements in North Central Province, Sri Lanka
- List of settlements in Northern Province, Sri Lanka
- List of settlements in North Western Province, Sri Lanka
- List of settlements in Sabaragamuwa
- List of settlements in Southern Province, Sri Lanka
- List of settlements in Uva
- List of settlements in Western Province, Sri Lanka

== See also ==
- List of towns in Sri Lanka, a list of settlements in Sri Lanka with a population between 5,000 and 50,000.
