= Batticaloa Jailbreak =

Batticaloa Jailbreak may refer to:

- 1983 Batticaloa Jailbreak, carried out by Tamil militants in September 1983 in Sri Lanka
- 1984 Batticaloa Jailbreak, carried out by Tamil Tigers in June 1984 in Sri Lanka
