= Kokkadichcholai massacre =

Kokkadichcholai massacre may refer to:

- Prawn farm massacre, a 1987 massacre of Tamil workers in Kokkadichcholai by Sri Lankan police
- 1991 Kokkadichcholai massacre, a massacre of Tamil civilians by Sri Lankan soldiers
