= Seyed Ali Zahir Moulana =

Sri Lankan politician and diplomat (born 1956)

The Honourable Seyed Ali Zahir Moulana MP
- සේයෙඩ් අලි සාහිර් මෞලාන அலி சாஹிர் மௌலானா

State Minister of Social Empowerment
- In office 21 December 2018 – 18 November 2019
- President: Maithripala Sirisena
- Prime Minister: Ranil Wickremesinghe

Deputy Minister of National Integration, Reconciliation & Official Languages
- In office 2 May 2018 – 21 December 2018
- President: Maithripala Sirisena
- Prime Minister: Ranil Wickremesinghe

Member of Parliament of Sri Lanka for Batticaloa District
- Incumbent
- Assumed office 11 October 2023
- Preceded by: Ahamed Nazeer Zainulabdeen
- In office 17 August 2015 – 3 January 2020
- In office 16 August 1994 – 23 July 2004

Member of Eastern Provincial Council
- In office 6 February 2015 – 17 August 2015

Chairman of Eravur Urban Council
- In office 17 March 2011 – 6 February 2015
- In office 12 March 1994 – 16 August 1994

Minister of Economic Affairs, Embassy of Sri Lanka in Washington, D.C.
- In office 6 December 2007 – 15 December 2009

Personal details
- Born: June 25, 1956 (age 70) Eravur, Dominion of Ceylon
- Party: Sri Lanka Freedom Party; United National Party; Sri Lanka Muslim Congress
- Other political affiliations: United People's Freedom Alliance; United National Front for Good Governance
- Education: Aligarh Central College; St. Michael's College
- Occupation: Politician
- Profession: Software Engineer

Seyed Ali Zahir Moulana (born 25 June 1956) is a Sri Lankan politician, former diplomat and local government activist. He is most known for the pivotal and important role he played in bringing about an end to the Sri Lankan Civil War.

He has been politically active since 1988, and is the current Member of Parliament for the Batticaloa District, the only directly elected Sri Lanka Muslim Congress Parliamentarian in the current Parliament of Sri Lanka. He is the State Minister of Social Empowerment, appointed by President Maithripala Sirisena on 21 December 2018.

He was previously elected as a Member of Parliament for the Batticaloa District, under the United National Party from August 16, 1994, until his resignation on June 23, 2004.

Moulana is most noted for his orchestration of the defection of prominent members of the LTTE guerrilla group, including its one-time Military Commander Vinayagamoorthy Muralitharan (Colonel Karuna), from the militant group to the government in 2004. He resigned his seat in Parliament shortly thereafter due to the rising threat on his life from the LTTE. Moulana thereafter was appointed as a high-ranking diplomat at the Embassy of Sri Lanka to the United States., and upon his return to Sri Lanka in 2010, he resumed his political career by being elected as the Mayor of Eravur, and thereafter as a Member of the Eastern Provincial Council and held that position until his re-election to Parliament in August 2015.

He served as Minister of State for Primary Industries and Social Empowerment in the Maithripala Sirisena government from 2015 to 2019.

== Early life ==
Moulana grew up in Eravur, and attended Aligarh Central College in Eravur for his primary education, and thereafter the Jesuit-run St. Michael's College for his secondary education.

For his post-secondary education, he attended Jamal Mohamed College in Trichy, India, obtaining a bachelor's degree in commerce, and immediately thereafter the University of California, Los Angeles, US, obtaining a master's degree in computer science in 1987.

Moulana then returned to Sri Lanka in 1988 and entered active politics.

== Early political career ==
=== Eravur Massacre ===
Two nights prior, they had overrun and demolished the Eravur Police Station leaving the populace virtually helpless. Moulana was the first on the scene, and with the help of the Minister of Defense Ranjan Wijeratne, an army camp was established in Moulana's own home to help prevent further attacks from taking place on the people.

=== Eravur Pradeshiya Sabha ===
In March 1994, Local Government Elections were held in northern and eastern parts of Sri Lanka. Moulana formed an independent party and contested as its chief candidate in the Eravur Pradeshiya Sabha elections. His party was elected with a large majority, and as the highest polled, he was unanimously elected Chairman of the Eravur Pradeshiya Sabha.

=== Member of Parliament (1994-2004) ===
Prior to the Parliamentary elections in August 1994, Moulana and his supporters were invited by then President D.B. Wijetunga to join the United National Party (UNP). Owing to the rise in popularity of the sectarian Sri Lanka Muslim Congress led by its founder leader M. H. M. Ashraff in the region, his dissent towards communal politics and interest towards pursuing a national identity for the Muslim community led Moulana to accept the invitation, and he subsequently contested and won the 1994 General Election with the UNP for the Batticaloa District, and was an opposition Member of Parliament.

He remained a Member of Parliament until his resignation on June 23, 2004.

=== Assassination attempt ===
Around 5:40 pm on December 9, 1995, Moulana and another UNP MP Jayalath Jayawardena were travelling to Batticaloa from Colombo, when their convoy was ambushed along the A15 highway in Kiran by around 40 members of the LTTE. After 11 minutes of intense fighting, the convoy managed to enter the cover of the nearby Sittandy army camp. Moulana and Jayawardena escaped unhurt, although two of Moulana's bodyguards were killed in the attempt, while 5 others sustained injuries.

== UNP Government, Ceasefire, Karuna Controversy and Resignation from Parliament ==
=== Ceasefire & Development ===
In the December 2001 General Elections, the UNP swept to power and formed the government with Ranil Wickremesinghe, the leader of the UNP appointed as the new Prime Minister. Moulana was appointed as Senior Advisor to the Prime Minister. The government then set about on its plan for the cessation of hostilities through a Norwegian government brokered ceasefire with the LTTE. During this time, peace talks commenced between the government and LTTE on a political solution to the ethnic crisis.

Moulana was tasked with developing a dialogue with LTTE leaders in the grassroots, and promote the UNP government's plan for development and reconciliation with the dissidents. By doing so, Moulana worked closely with the LTTE leadership, developing a close working relationship especially with Colonel Karuna Amman (alias Vinayagamoorthy Muralitharan), the LTTE's Eastern Commander and overall Military Leader and strategist, and one of Velupillai Prabhakaran's most trusted lieutenants.

By building good relationships with the LTTE, the UNP government was able to provide the general populace amenities that they were deprived of for decades. At Moulana's initiative and under his direct supervision in a period of two years the Badulla-Chenkaladi A5 highway was reopened, railway lines were reconstructed and train services resumed to Batticaloa from Colombo after 10 years, and the first project of electrification for rural uncleared areas in Sri Lanka were carried out providing over 3000 homes with electricity.

=== Karuna Defection Involvement ===
In early 2004, Colonel Karuna began lamenting to Moulana of his displeasure with the LTTE leader on the insufficient distribution of resources and power towards the Tamils resident in eastern Sri Lanka. Moulana saw this is an indication of a possible significant split emerging within the LTTE, and informed Prime Minister Ranil Wickremesinghe of this development. He was instructed by the Prime Minister to covertly "keep the door open with Karuna".

In February 2004, Sri Lankan President Chandrika Kumaratunga dissolved parliament and called for fresh elections. This led to the UNP government's operations with respect to the ceasefire to come to a temporary halt until elections were held. Moulana however, continued to keep tabs on Karuna.

When Karuna continued to express to Moulana of his dissatisfaction with the LTTE leadership, especially with his startling revelation that the LTTE did not intend to follow through with their commitment to the peace process, and were merely regrouping, Moulana realised that with the clear intention of the LTTE revealed, the only way a lasting peace can be restored in Sri Lanka is by defeating the LTTE militarily, and the only way the Sri Lankan government can defeat the LTTE is with Karuna on their side. Moulana then over a series of meetings with the Colonel began to convince him to defect from the LTTE and enter the democratic mainstream where he can voice his opinions on behalf of his people on a political platform.

In March 2004, Colonel Karuna officially announced in two letters that he sent to the LTTE leadership with copies to the international media that he was renouncing his LTTE membership, along with 5000 troops loyal to him in the districts of Trincomalee, Batticaloa and Ampara. This was the biggest expression of dissension in the history of the LTTE, severely weakening the LTTE's fighting force and a clash within the factions in the LTTE seemed imminent. Karuna then formed his own political party, the Tamil Makkal Viduthalai Pulikal (TMVP) and absorbed over 5000 troops loyal to him from the LTTE into his new party's paramilitary wing.

The LTTE began to launch an offensive against Karuna and the troops loyal to him. On April 9, 2004, large numbers of LTTE Sea Tigers and ground forces landed on the banks of the Verugal river in Vakarai, Batticaloa, and in clear violation of the Ceasefire accord signed with the Sri Lankan government began attacking and killing civilians and cadres loyal to Karuna alike in a brutal offensive. Karuna did not intend any harm to befall any civilians and withdrew all his troops and heavy artillery machinery to his main base in the Thopigalla jungles.

He then requested Moulana to arrange for secured transportation for himself and his trusted lieutenants to withdraw to the capital city of Colombo. As nearly 500 LTTE troops were moving fast on the offensive towards Karuna's base in Thopigalla, Moulana who happened to be close to the area, and due to the extreme sensitivity of the situation, decided to personally go to Karuna's base and get Karuna to safety himself. A six-car convoy carrying Moulana, Karuna and 20 other confidantes of Karuna retreated to Colombo on April 9, 2004, under the cover of darkness, where they were handed over by Moulana to high-ranking officers of the Sri Lanka Army Military Intelligence. Intelligence reports later revealed to the public said that Moulana and Karuna had managed to escape from the advancing LTTE forces by a mere 10 minutes.

=== Return to Parliament and Resignation ===
Moulana did not contest the 2004 General Elections, but was one of four UNP MPs nominated to Parliament through the National List due to a deal made between the UNP and the Sri Lanka Muslim Congress to not field any UNP Muslim candidates from the East.

In June 2004, one of the Karuna loyalists who retreated to Colombo along with Karuna and Moulana was forced to return to Batticaloa and was captured and tortured by the LTTE, in which they forced a confession out of her. It was then revealed by her through a press conference called by the LTTE that it was Moulana who was Karuna's link with the government, and it was with him that they had come to Colombo. This revelation sparked a huge controversy surrounding the Government of Sri Lanka, the Sri Lanka Army, the UNP and Moulana, as it implicated the government's role behind the split in the LTTE.

Owing to the severe threat on the lives of Moulana and that of his family by the LTTE assassination squads, Moulana immediately resigned from Parliament and fled Sri Lanka on June 23, 2004.

== Diplomatic career ==
While living in self-exile in the United States due to the threat on his life, Moulana was nominated by President Mahinda Rajapaksa and confirmed by the Cabinet of Sri Lanka as the Minister of Economic Affairs at the Embassy of Sri Lanka in Washington DC, USA. He ended his tour of duty in USA in December 2009.

== Return to Sri Lanka and resumption of political career ==
After the end of the Civil War in 2009, Moulana returned to Sri Lanka after living in self-exile in the United States for over 5 years in December 2009. Due to his involvement in the Karuna defection, Moulana was viewed by many Sri Lankans as being one of the pivotal components instrumental to bringing about an end to the civil conflict in Sri Lanka that had lasted nearly 3 decades.

=== Eravur Urban Council ===
In March 2011, Moulana contested the Local Government Elections and was elected with an overwhelming majority as the Chairman (Mayor) of Eravur Urban Council. Eravur Urban Council is responsible for providing a variety of local public services including roads, sanitation, drains, housing, libraries, public parks and recreational facilities. Eravur, under his tenure as chairman was selected by the United Nations Disaster Risk Reduction Programme as a Role Model City for Disaster Resilience.

=== Federation of Sri Lanka Local Government Authorities and Commonwealth Local Government Forum ===
Subsequent to becoming Chairman of the Eravur Urban Council, Moulana was unanimously elected as the President of the Federation of Sri Lanka Local Government Authorities (FSLGA).

Moulana was elected as a board member of the Commonwealth Local Government Forum (CLGF) in July 2015, and also board member of United Cities and Local Governments (UCLG) for the Asia-Pacific Region. He was re-elected for a second term to the CLGF Board in November 2017.

=== Member of Eastern Provincial Council ===
Moulana was appointed as a Member of the Eastern Provincial Council on 6 February 2015. He took oaths before the Governor of Eastern Province, Austin Fernando.

=== Return to Parliament ===
Following the dissolution of Parliament in June 2015, Moulana joined the Sri Lanka Muslim Congress (SLMC) and the United National Front for Good Governance (UNFGG). He claimed that he had been aligned with national parties for over 27 years, but owing to the failure of these parties to address the issues of Muslims and the subsequent deterioration of the Muslim community's image in the recent past of Sri Lanka, he had decided to join the SLMC. Muslims represent 70% of Moulana's vote base. He contested under the SLMC symbol in the Batticaloa District and was re-elected to Parliament on August 17, 2015, with nearly 40,000 votes, being the only Parliamentarian directly elected under the SLMC. All other elected SLMC Parliamentarians were elected through the UNFGG. Moulana re-entered Parliament after a lapse of 11 years.
