= Vellaveli Brahmi Inscription =

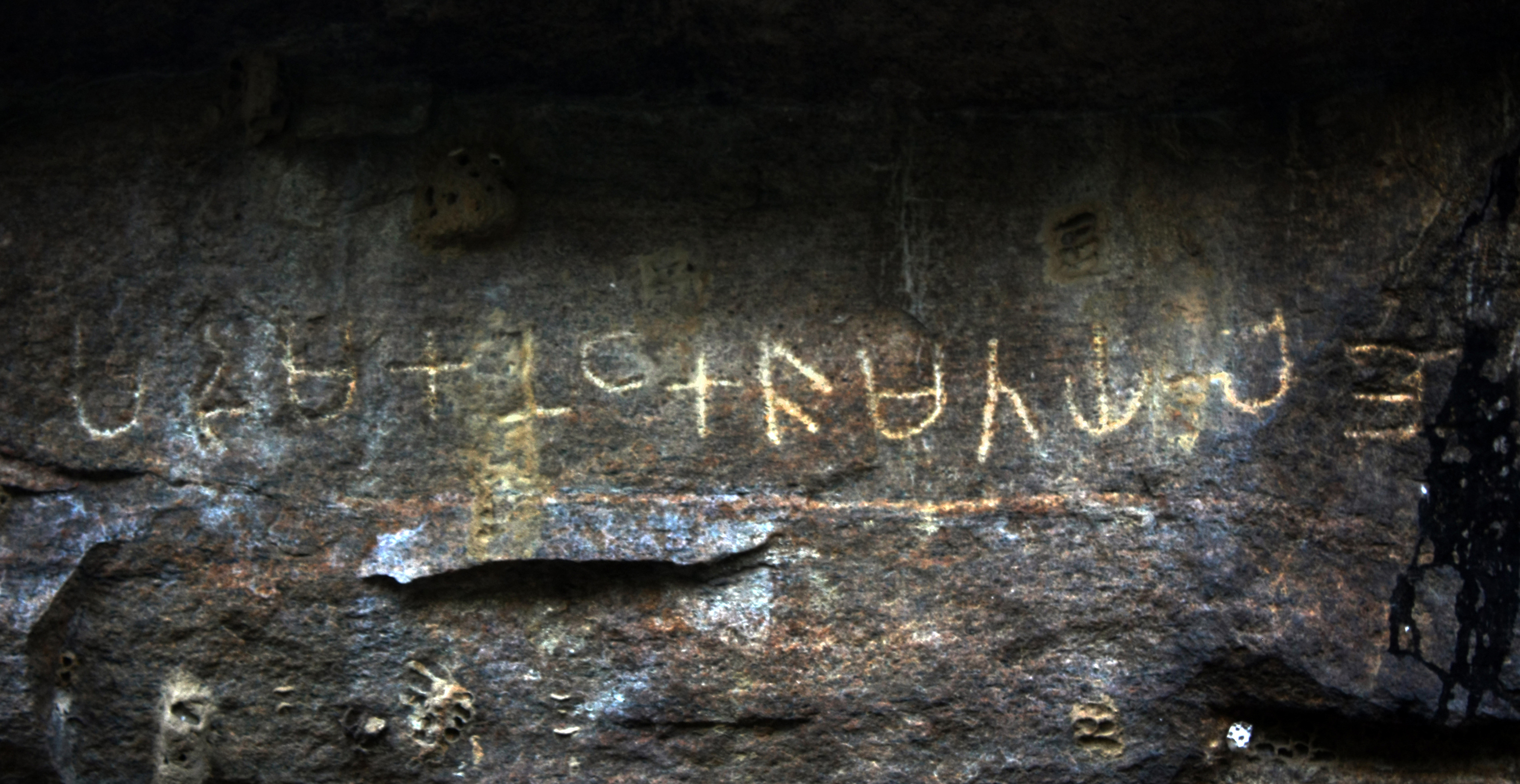
Vellaveli Brahmi Inscription on a rock

Vellaveli Brahmi Inscription is a rock-cut record on rocks in Thalavai (Vellavely) of Batticaloa, Sri Lanka. The place located 50 km away from Batticaloa through Kaluvanchikudy A4 road. The place is surrounded by rocks and hills. There are about four inscriptions, and 3 out of 4 cannot readable or damaged due to natural impact. Some parts of rocks are carved by human activity, which could have happened in ancient days. The initial finding says that it is dated to approximately 2200 years, and it has mix of both Brahmi and Prakrit.
