= Ranawa =

Coordinates: 7°55′N 80°35′E

- Village
- Interactive map of Ranawa
- Country: Sri Lanka
- Province: North Central Province
- Time zone: UTC+5:30 (Sri Lanka Standard Time)

Ranawa is a village in Sri Lanka. It is located within North Central Province.

== See also ==
- List of settlements in North Central Province (Sri Lanka)
