= Pangala, North Central Province =

Coordinates: 7°51′N 80°34′E

Pangala, Eastern Province
- Village
- Interactive map of Pangala, Eastern Province
- Country: Sri Lanka
- Province: North Central Province
- District: Anuradhapura District
- Time zone: UTC+5:30 (Sri Lanka Standard Time)

Pangala is a village in Sri Lanka. It is located within North Central Province.

== See also ==
- List of towns in North Central Province, Sri Lanka
