= Ameer Ali Shihabdeen =

Sri Lankan politician

Hon. Ameer Ali Sihabdeen MP

Minister of Disaster Relief Services
- In office 2007–2010

Member of Parliament for Batticaloa District
- Incumbent
- Assumed office 17 August 2015
- In office 2 April 2004 – 9 February 2010

Personal details
- Born: Ammer Ali Seyed Mohammad Sihabdeen; 9 March 1961 (age 65) Oddamavadi, Sri Lanka
- Party: United National Party
- Spouse: Hayrunnisa Ameer Ali
- Education: Sri Lanka Law College
- Occupation: Politician
- Profession: Teacher, Lawyer

Ammer Ali Seyed Mohammad Sihabdeen (born 20 December 1961) is a Sri Lankan politician, a member of the Parliament of Sri Lanka and a Deputy Minister of Rural Economic Affairs. Ameer Ali is married and has three sons.

At the 13th parliamentary elections in April 2004 he was elected to parliament as a member for Batticaloa. He served as the Non-Cabinet Minister of Disaster Relief Services from 2007 until February 2010. Sihabdeen failed to get re-elected at the subsequent parliamentary elections in 2010.

In 2012 Sihabdeen was elected to the 2nd Eastern Provincial Council, representing United People's Freedom Alliance in the Batticaloa Electoral District.

At the 15th parliamentary elections, held in August 2015, he was re-elected as a member for Batticaloa, representing the All Ceylon Makkal Congress. After his election he was appointed as the Deputy Minister of Rural Economic Affairs.
