= Ramalingam Paramadeva =

Architect of 1983 Batticaloa Jailbreak

- Died: 1984; Kaluwanchikudy, Batticaloa District, Sri Lanka
- Occupation: Militant leader of Tamil Tigers
- Political party: Liberation Tigers of Tamil Eelam

Ramalingam Paramadeva (died 1984) was one of the architects of 1983 Batticaloa Jailbreak. After his escape, he joined the Tamil Tigers. Later on, the behalf of Tamil Tigers, he successfully carried out the 1984 Batticaloa Jailbreak, to release a female political inmate who was left behind in the first one.

He was one of the senior leaders of Tamil Tigers in Batticaloa and was killed in 1984 at Kaluwanchikudy, Batticaloa District.
