= Oddamavadi Bridge =

Oddamavadi Bridge ஓட்டமாவடிப் பாலம்
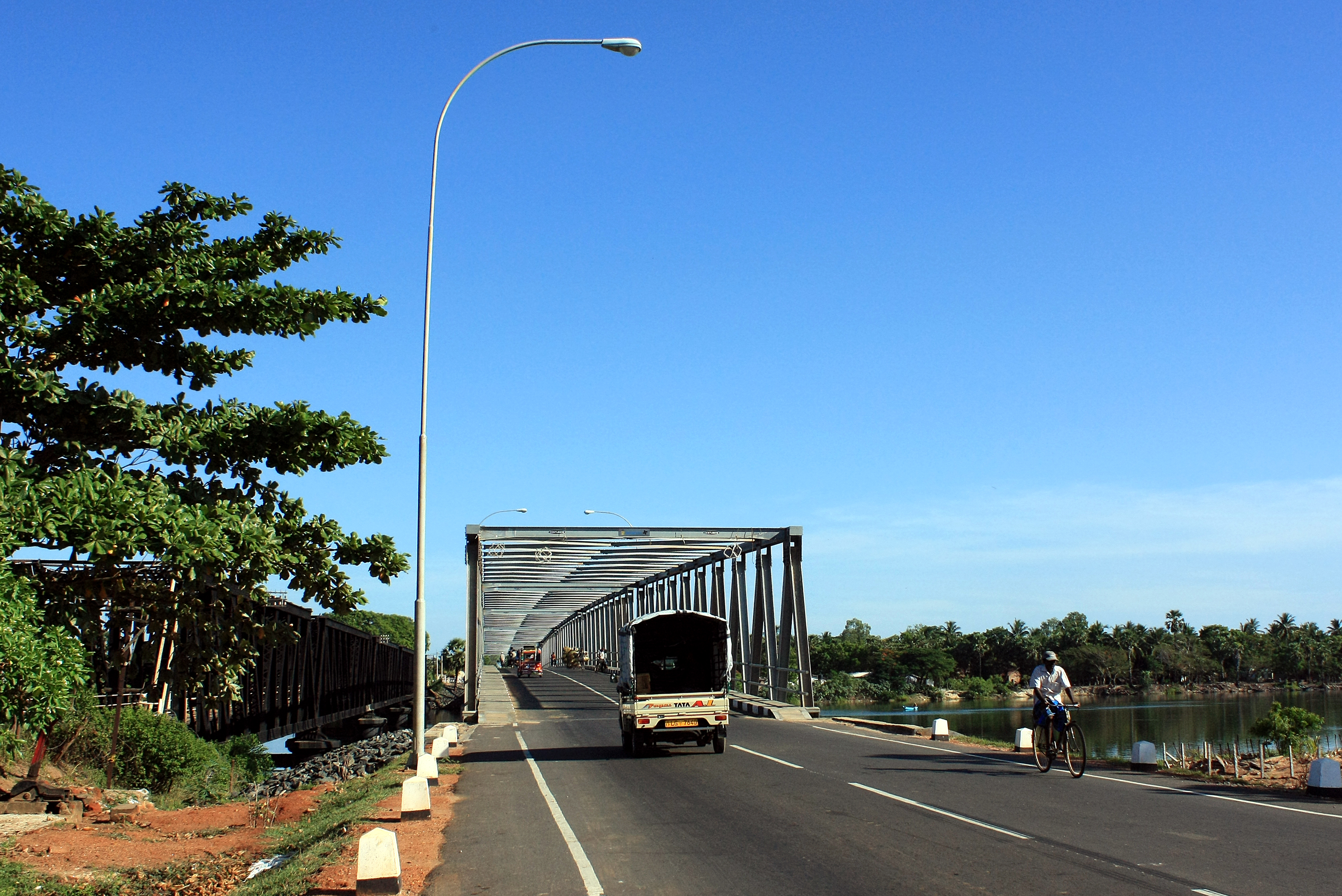
- Old (left) and New (right) bridges
- Coordinates: 7.9213°N 81.515°E
- Carries: 3 lanes (2 lanes of highway and 1 railway)
- Crosses: Valaichchenai lagoon
- Locale: Oddamavadi, Sri Lanka
- Owner: Ministry of Ports & Highways
- Maintained by: Road Development Authority

Characteristics
- Design: Truss bridge (old); Cantilever bridge (new)
- Material: Iron, cement
- Total length: 250 m (820 ft)
- Width: 10.5 m (34 ft)
- Clearance below: Rs.2.6 billion

History
- Designer: British Ceylon & Sri Lanka
- Construction start: 2007(New)
- Construction end: 1924 (Old); 2010 (New)
- Construction cost: Rs.770 million

Location
- Interactive map of Oddamavadi Bridge

Oddamavadi Bridge (Tamil: ஓட்டமாவடிப் பாலம்) is a road bridge in Oddamavadi, Sri Lanka a length of 250 meters. It crosses the Valaichchenai Lagoon at Batticaloa. The bridge is part of the A15 Batticaloa-Trincomallee highway. It comprises 2 bridges, a British Ceylon era truss bridge which is used as road-rail bridge, and a newly built bridge carrying 2 lanes of highway. The new two lane bridge is 250 m (820 ft) long and 10.5 m (34 ft) wide. The new Oddamavadi bridge was built with financial assistance of the Spanish Government and the World Bank.

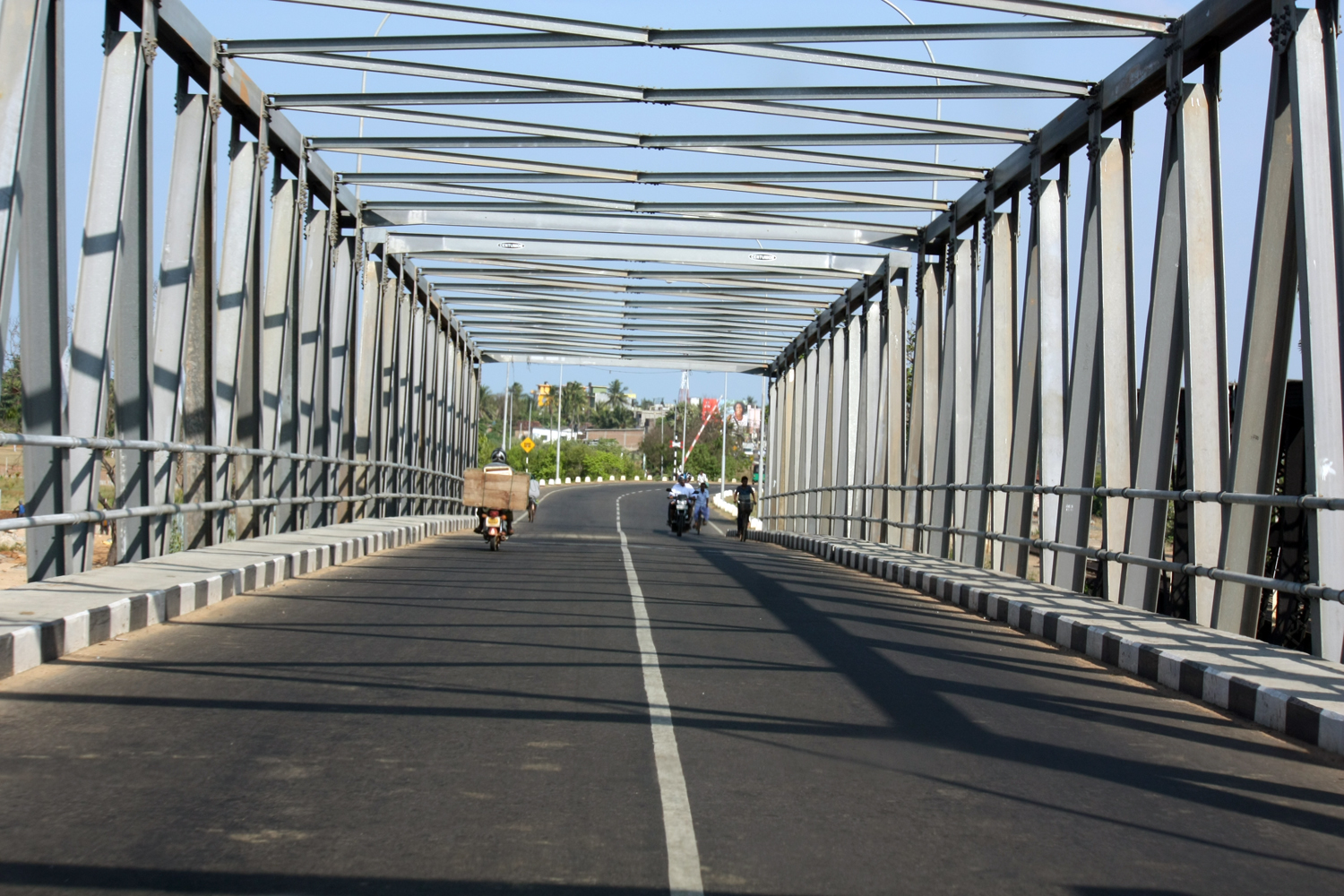
Inside of bridge
