= Prawn farm massacre =

1987 terror attack in Sri Lanka

- Part of Sri Lankan civil war
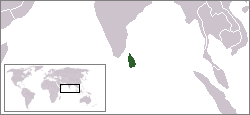
- Location of Sri Lanka

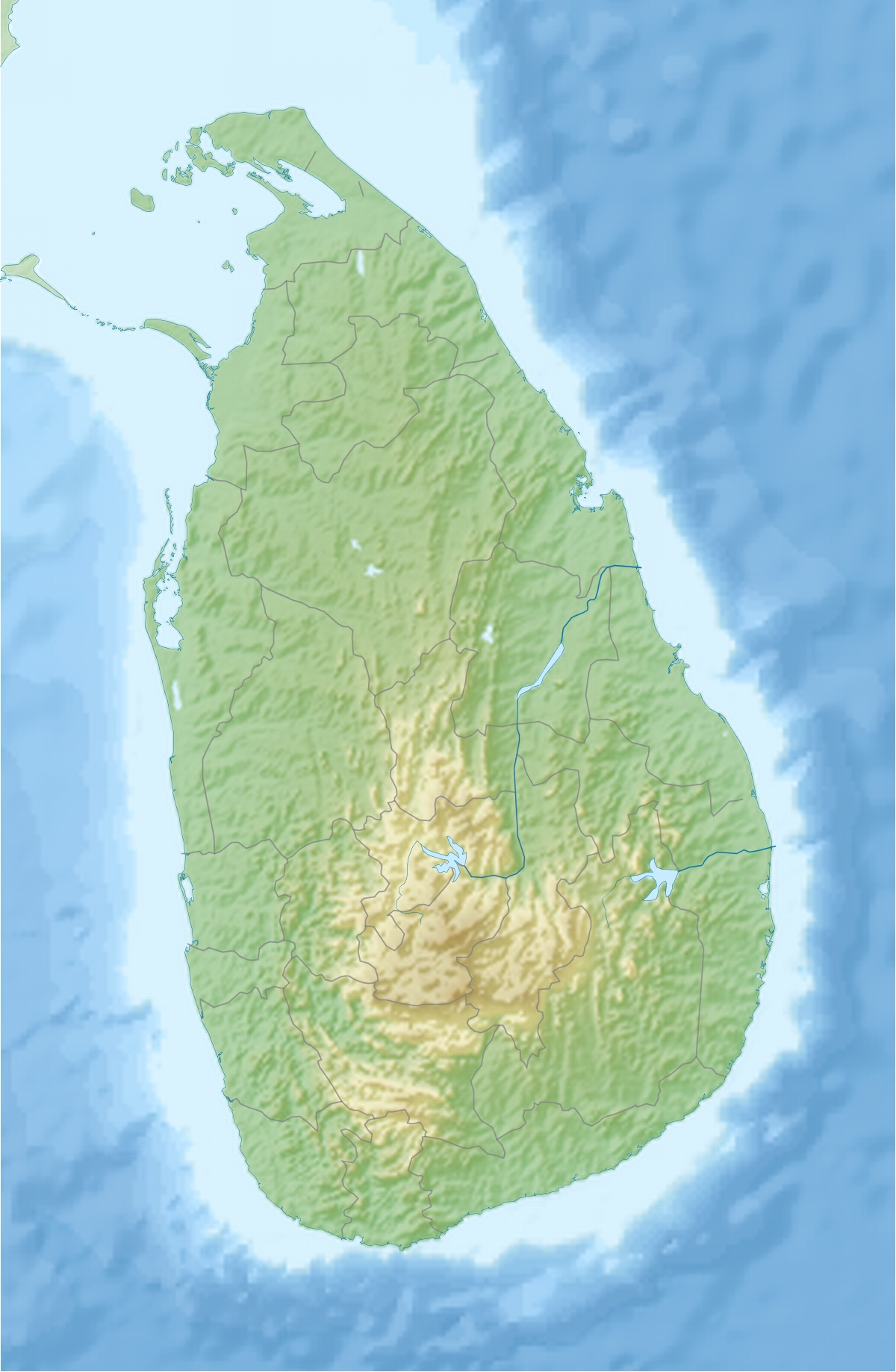
- Location: 7°37′N 81°43′E; Kokkadichcholai, Eastern Province, Sri Lanka
- Date: 27 January 1987 (+6 GMT)
- Target: Sri Lankan Tamil village residents
- Attack type: Armed massacre
- Weapons: Automatics rifles, Knives, axes
- Deaths: 83
- Perpetrator: Special Task Force

The Prawn farm massacre, also known as the 1987 Kokkadichcholai massacre, took place on 27 January 1987 in the village of Kokkadichcholai, Batticaloa District, Sri Lanka. At least 83 Tamil civilians were killed. The Special Task Force, an elite special forces unit of the Sri Lanka Police specializing in counter-terrorist and counter-insurgency operations, was accused of having perpetrated the massacre.

Asian Agricultural Products Limited (AAPL), the Hong Kong based part-owner of the farm, filed for arbitration by the International Centre for Settlement of Investment Disputes (ICSID), an arm of the World Bank, against the government of Sri Lanka; AAPL prevailed in the arbitration, eventually received payment and families of the victims were paid some monetary compensation.

== Background ==
Serendib Seafoods Limited was a shrimp farming joint venture established in Sri Lanka about half owned by Sri Lankans. The remainder was held by AAPL, owned by an American, David Milton, as well as other American and European individuals. Serendib's farm was located on the East Coast of Sri Lanka near Batticaloa and its hatchery was in Negombo. As part of the ongoing civil war in Sri Lanka, Serendib's farm, employing a large number of local workers, was attacked and destroyed. One of the prominent local partners was Sam Tambimuttu, a lawyer who became a Member of Parliament (MP) in 1989.

At the time of the attack it was assumed that Tamil militant groups (mainly LTTE, EPRLF, and EROS), were using the farm as a base for their activities. However, when the farm was raided by the Special Task Force (STF), any militants had fled the site. Only farm workers and local civilians who sought refuge remained.

== Attack ==
Relatives of the victims said that on 27 January 1987 a number of helicopters circled the area. The STF entered the village from Vellaveli, Kondavedduvan, Kaluvanchikudi and Kallady camps in trucks. At a nearby junction, a vehicle was parked and some STF officers exited the vehicle and walked into the prawn farm. The STF gathered up the farm employees, checked their identity cards and herded them onto a semi-trailer; they were taken to a road junction and shot dead. Seven of the victims were boys aged 12 to 14. Forty non-employees who had sought refuge in the farm were also shot and killed. The bodies were later burnt on piles of old tires obtained by the security forces from the town's bus depot.

The relatives of the victims alleged that STF personnel invaded a house near the farm, warning the residents not to speak about the massacre or report it to anyone.

== Reaction ==
The government denied the massacre at the farm but the Managing Director of Serendib Seafoods Limited, Victor Santhiapillai, who was a former Executive Director of the International Trade Centre (a United Nations body), together with a consultant to the company, Bruce Cyr (an American national) rebutted the government's denial and confirmed that the massacre did in fact take place. They also contradicted the government's claim that those killed were either terrorists or that they died in the crossfire. Rejecting the government Media Centre's claim Santhiapillai said, "I totally reject the Media Centre's charge that the 22 Serendib Seafoods staff members (plus 12 still missing) who were shot by the STF were terrorists. The Centre must find some other more intelligent and plausible ways of handling such incidents."

AAPL, as a Hong Kong company, was covered by the Sri Lanka-United Kingdom Bilateral Investment Treaty and filed for arbitration by ICSID, an arm of the World Bank, with the aim of providing compensation to the families of the murdered employees as well as reimbursement to its investors. Three arbitrators—from Egypt, France and Ghana—were selected. AAPL was represented by the retired General Counsel of the World Bank, Dr. Heribert Golsong from Germany, and prevailed in the arbitration by a 2 to 1 vote. AAPL was awarded substantial compensation but the government of Sri Lanka did not make payment until one of AAPL's British shareholders, Richard Lund, urged the UK Foreign and Commonwealth Office to use its influence to induce compensation due, which was then made promptly.

== See also ==
- List of attacks on civilians attributed to Sri Lankan government forces
