= Kokkadicholai Thaanthonreeswarar Temple =

Saiva Temple in Sri Lanka

- Kokkadicholai Thanthonrichcharam Kovil
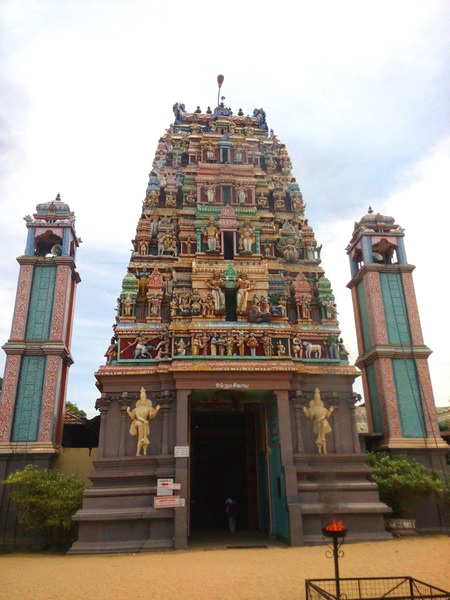
- Entrance of Kokkaddicholai Thanthonriswaram

- Location in Sri Lanka

Religion
- Affiliation: Hinduism
- District: Batticaloa
- Province: Eastern
- Deity: Lord Shiva
- Festivals: Utsava, annual chariot festival

Location
- Location: Kokkadicholai
- Country: Sri Lanka
- Interactive map of Kokkadicholai Thaanthonreeswarar Temple

Architecture
- Type: thamizh or tamil architecture

Kokkadicholai Thaanthonrichcharar Kovil (also known as Kokkadicholai Thanthonrichcharam) is the most significant Shaivism Kovil located in Kokkadicholai, 15 km southwest Batticaloa District of Eastern Province, Sri Lanka. It is also one of the oldest and five most important Kovils in Sri Lanka and it is believed to be one of the two Kovils in Sri Lanka to have naturally built Sivalingam. The chariot festival of the temple is held annually usually in the month of September. One of the main chariots used in the festival was constructed with wooden sculptures in the 18th century.

== History ==
The temple is believed to have been originated in the 4th century BC and built by Ulaga Naachi who belonged to the Chola Empire. The temple is also well known for its miracles. One of them famously witnessed during the Portuguese era in Sri Lanka. A bull statue which is located inside the temple ate grass and chased the Portuguese soldiers away from the temple who were aiming to destroy the temple at that time.
