= 1991 Kokkadichcholai massacre =

1991 mass killing of Sri Lankan Tamils by the Sri Lankan military

Kokkadichcholai massacre
- The memorial erected by the local regional council to remember the victims of the multiple massacres. Names of the victims are etched in the memorial (circa 2006)

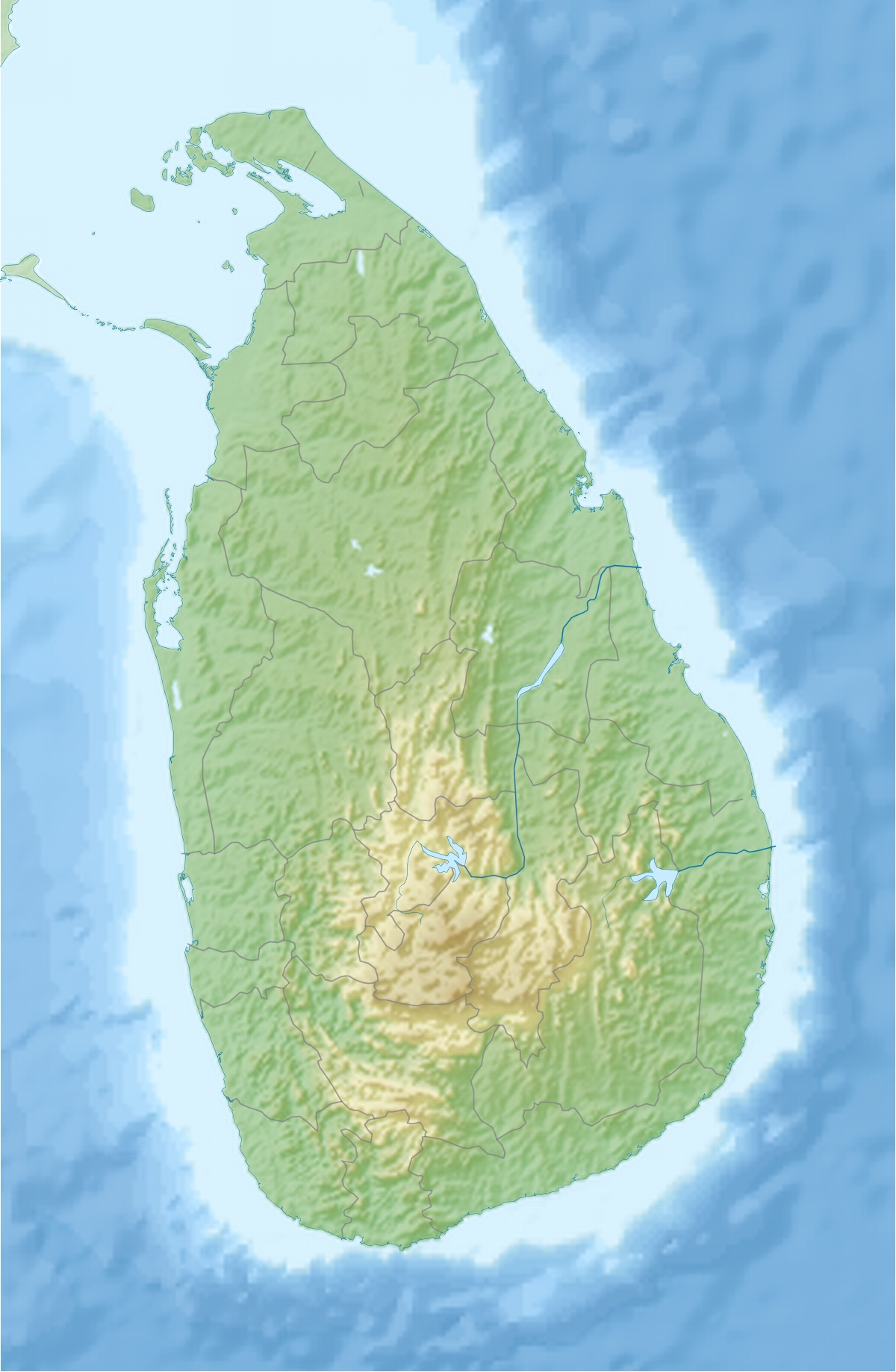
- Location: 07°37′26″N 81°43′01″E; Kokkadichcholai, Sri Lanka
- Date: June 12, 1991
- Target: Sri Lankan Tamil village residents
- Attack type: Armed massacre
- Weapons: Automatic rifles, knives, axes
- Deaths: 152
- Perpetrator: Sri Lankan Army

On June 12, 1991, 152 minority Sri Lankan Tamil civilians were massacred by members of the Sri Lankan military in the village Kokkadichcholai near the eastern province town of Batticaloa. The Sri Lankan government instituted a presidential commission to investigate the massacre. The commission found the commanding officer negligent in controlling his troops and recommended that he be removed from office, and identified nineteen other members of the Sri Lankan military to be responsible for mass murder. In a military tribunal that followed in the presidential commission in the capital city of Colombo, all nineteen soldiers were acquitted.

== Background information ==
Batticaloa district forms part of the Eastern province of Sri Lanka. Within the Batticaloa district, during the late 1980s and early 1990s a total of 1,100 civilians became victims of enforced disappearance and assumed killed. In the cluster of villages around Kokkadicholai there were two notable massacres, one in 1987 and the other in June 1991.

== 1991 massacre ==
On 12 June 1991, following a Liberation Tigers of Tamil Eelam (LTTE) landmine attack on the Sri Lankan Army, a number of Tamil civilians in the Kokkadichcholai region were massacred by the Sri Lankan Army. The human rights agency University Teachers for Human Rights (UTHR) estimates that over 123 civilians were killed, although the Sinhalese-dominated police force (who are known to minimise evidence), certified the death of only 32 individuals. Locals also reported that six Tamil women were raped, including two sisters. The elder one was found by her father trying to conceal her breasts with her plaited hair, whilst the younger sister was found in a shop in a state of shock. The police also denied there was rape, although this has been contradicted privately by medical officials afraid to speak out in public.

=== The incident ===
Kokkadicholai is in reality a collection of number of hamlets close to the lagoon west of Batticaloa city. The dominant ethnic group was the minority Sri Lankan Tamils belonging to the Mukkuvar caste who were mostly farmers. There was an army camp within the main hamlet that used to be supplied with food via a ferry that was transported by a tractor to the camp. On June 12, 1991, about 12:45 PM an improvised explosive device was detonated under a supply tractor that killed two Sri Lankan Army soldiers. Following the explosion, more soldiers started moving from Kokkadichcholai to the scene of the explosion. At this army camp, there was also a group of 10 militants who belonged formerly to the paramilitary group Peoples Liberation Organisation of Tamil Eelam (PLOTE). Some of this group too went with the soldiers towards the scene but they were disarmed by the soldiers. These disarmed paramilitary cadres went back to the village and warned the civilians an attack on them was imminent.

Most able men and some women were able to get away but a group of individuals who could not get away took refuge at a rice processing mill belonging to a one Kurukulasingam. It was estimated that over a hundred people were in this house. It was reported by survivors that a group of soldiers from Kokkadichcholai entered the mill premises and opened fire. Many inside the mill were killed and those in the adjoining house injured. Once the soldiers left survivors and onlookers went to the mill to inspect the status of the dead. It was estimated that about 35 people were looking around the premises when another group of another six soldiers thrust the onlookers into the premises and shot them along with the five previously injured. The soldiers then attempted to set fire to the corpses. Amongst the dead were old people, women and children. Later on 17 youngsters were taken from a nearby hamlet called Mudalaikudah to the crater caused by the explosion and killed and their bodies burnt. Number of properties were also burnt as well as property looted. As the army stayed within the camp on the 13th, amongst the early visitors to the massacre site were the rebel LTTE group who took photographic records of the corpses. (see images here). As the sun rose, the corpses began to decompose and stink. At about 2.00 p.m. the villagers buried most of the corpses.

=== Government reaction ===
On June 16 an official party including the prime minister, Bradman Weerakoon and local members of parliament one Casinadar, Joseph Pararajasingham and Karunakaran were brought to the Kokkadichcholai army camp by helicopter. As the army Army maintained that those killed were Tigers and that it was unsafe to go to the villages, the prime minister's party was airlifted back to Batticaloa and taken to the rest house. As the prime minister was unable to meet the affected people, local M.P Joseph Pararajasingham met the people. By June 20 changes were made at the Kokkadichcholai camp by adding new officer was in charge.

=== Casualty estimates and rape accusations ===
According to UTHR, the number of victims according to leading local citizens following a house to house check, 67 bodies were identified and buried and a further 56 were missing (a total of 123). Most of the missing persons are presumed dead and cannot be identified, because like the seventeen burnt in the mine crater, they had been mostly burnt to ashes. The rice mill had the largest number of bodies – 43, although the police (with a history of minimising evidence) maintained that only 32 were killed. The locals also reported that at least six women (including two sisters) were raped, and despite the police denials, this was confirmed privately by medical officials.

== Government investigation ==
After international community began to put more pressure on Sri Lanka for its human rights record, the government instituted an independent Commission of Inquiry into a massacre by soldiers at Kokkadichcholai in the east in June 1991 – the first inquiry of its kind ever held in Sri Lanka.

According to Human Rights Watch, in 2002 the then Sri Lankan government authorities appeared more willing than in past years to acknowledge official responsibility for atrocities. On January 31, 2002 Sri Lankan army personnel in Batticaloa publicly acknowledged their role in large-scale massacres of civilians in the east, mentioning notorious attacks in Kokkaddicholai, Sathurukkondaan, Vanthaarumoolai, and Batticaloa. In February 2002, the attorney general reportedly issued indictments against more than six hundred police and armed forces personnel implicated in disappearances that occurred before 1994, many in connection with counterinsurgency operations against the Janatha Vimukthi Peramuna (JVP) organization. On June 28, two soldiers were sentenced to six years in prison and fined Rs. 2,500 (U.S. $27) each for their role in an abduction and murder in 1989.

The independent commission instituted to look into the Kokkadichcholai incident recommended that compensation of some 5.25 million rupees (approximately CDN$210,000) to be paid to next of kin of those who were killed (67 were identified) and to people who lost property in the rampage. The commission also recommends prosecution of the soldiers involved. In 2001 the army accepted responsibility for the large scale massacre at the hamlet of Kokkadicholai. A military tribunal found the commanding officer guilty of failure to control his troops and illegal disposal of the bodies, and he was dismissed from service. The other 19 soldiers under trial were acquitted but nevertheless sent to the front lines in the north of the country as a punishment. A number of organizations have expressed regret over this decision

== See also ==
- List of attacks on civilians attributed to Sri Lankan government forces
