= Valaichchenai Lagoon =

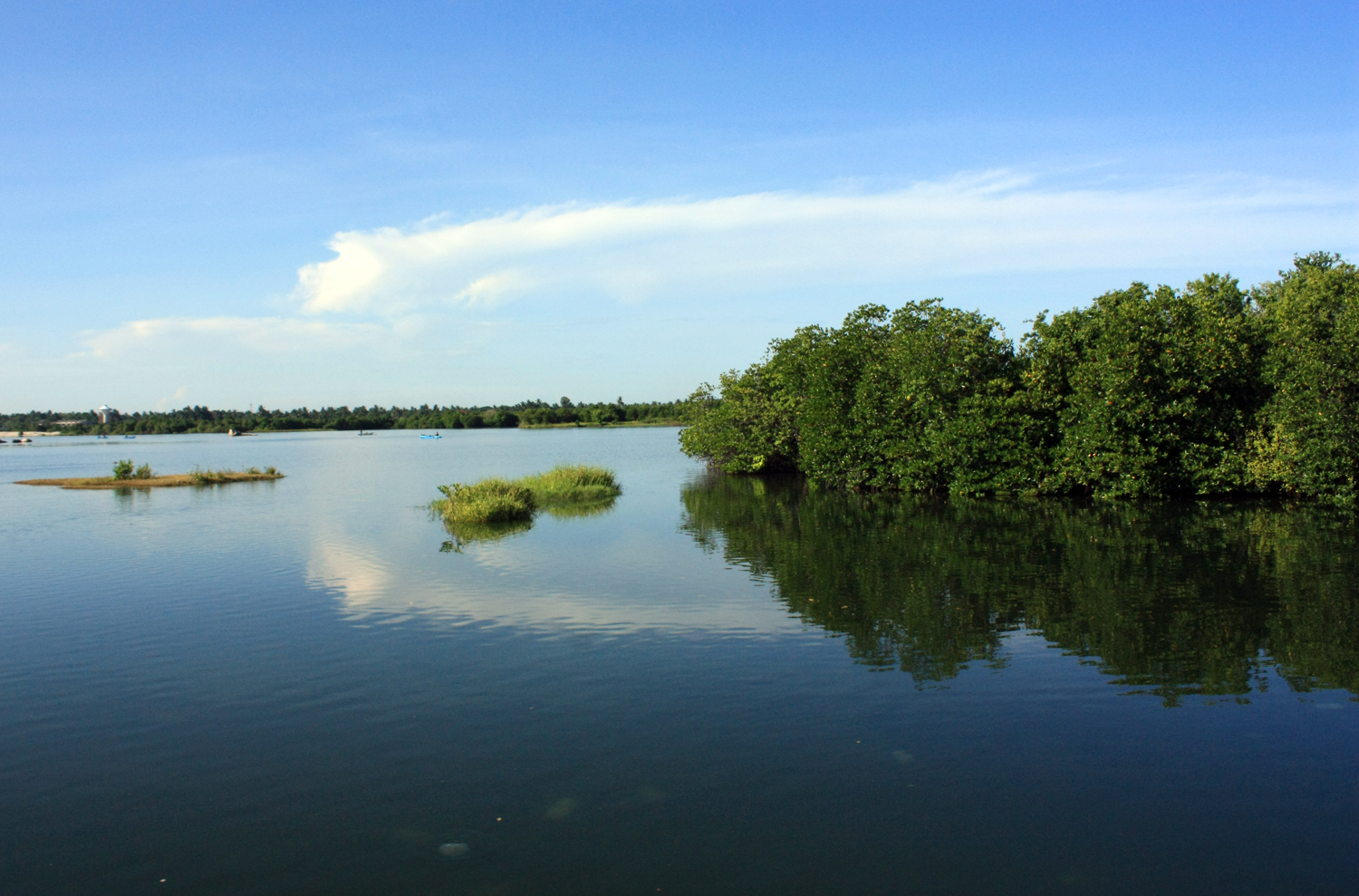
- Valaichchenai Lagoon in Nasivanthivu

- Location within Sri Lanka
- Location: Batticaloa District, Sri Lanka
- Coordinates: 7°55′47″N 81°31′52″E
- Type: Lagoon
- Primary outflows: Indian Ocean
- Max. depth: 2 metres (6.6 ft)
- Surface elevation: Sea level
- Settlements: Valaichchenai, Oddamavadi

Valaichchenai Lagoon is an estuarine lagoon in Batticaloa District, eastern Sri Lanka. Batticaloa district has three lagoons, such Valaichchenai Lagoon, Batticaloa Lagoon and Vakari Lagoon. Valaichchenai lagoon is situated in populated areas of Valaichchenai, Oddamavadi

The lagoon has muddy islands, mangroves, corals and marshes, and it unites Valaichchenai and Maduru Oya rivers. It opens the bay during rainy season, which happens in November & December. The two meter depth lagoon has 40–60 cm tidal. Oddamavadi Bridge, which has 250m length, crosses the lagoon and connects the mainlands in the region.
