= Eravur Urban Council =

Type
- Type: Local authority

Leadership
- Chairman: M. S. Naleem, MNA since 2021
- Deputy Chairman: M. L. Refubassam, UPFA since 2018
- Secretary: M. H. M. Hameem
- Seats: 17

Elections
- Last election: 2018 Sri Lankan local government elections

Eravur Urban Council (EUC) is the local authority for the town of Eravur in eastern Sri Lanka. EUC is responsible for providing a variety of local public services including roads, sanitation, drains, housing, libraries, public parks and recreational facilities. It has 9 members elected using the open list proportional representation system.

== Election results ==
=== 2006 local government election ===
Results of the local government election held on 20 May 2006:

Alliances and parties	Votes	%	Seats
Independent 6 (Sri Lanka Muslim Congress)	3,501	36.89%	5
United People's Freedom Alliance (NUA, NC, SLFP et al.)	2,460	25.92%	2
United National Party	2,004	21.11%	1'
Independent 3	716	7.54%	1
Tamil National Alliance (ITAK, EPRLF (S), TELO, ACTC)	521	5.49%	0
Independent 4	130	1.37%	0
Independent 1	124	1.31%	0
Independent 5	22	0.23%	0
Independent 7	9	0.09%	0
Independent 2	4	0.04%	0
Valid Votes	9,491	100.00%	9
Rejected Votes	280		
Total Polled	9,771		
Registered Electors	16,322		
Turnout	59.86%		

The following candidates were elected: Mohamed Cassim Abdul Gafoor (SLMC); Abu Haniffa Sahul Hameed (SLMC); Abdul Gafoor Mohamed Hassan (SLMC); Jamaldeen Mohamadu Jemeel (Ind 3); Mahumoothu Lebbe Abdul Lathief (UNP); Hayathu Mohamed Noor Mohamed (SLMC); Ahamed Farsath Jamaldeen Mohamed Musthafa (SLMC); Abdul Latif Mohamadu Yoosuf (UPFA); and Mohamadu Sarif Zubair (UPFA).

Mohamed Cassim Abdul Gafoor (SLMC) and Abu Haniffa Sahul Hameed (SLMC) were appointed Chairman and Deputy Chairman respectively.

The term of the council was due to expire in 2010 but on 22 December 2009 Minister of Local Government and Provincial Councils Janaka Bandara Tennakoon extended it until 31 March 2011.

Eravur Town Rural Council (Eravur Town Pradesha Sabhai or Eravur Town Pradeshiya Sabha) was promoted and renamed Eravur Urban Council with effect from 1 April 2011.

=== 2011 local government election ===
Results of the local government election held on 17 March 2011:

Alliances and parties	Votes	%	Seats
United People's Freedom Alliance (NC, ACMC, SLFP et al.)	6,593	54.32%	6
Sri Lanka Muslim Congress	3,453	28.45%	2
Independent 3	1,693	13.95%	1
Independent 1	158	1.30%	0
Independent 6	154	1.27%	0
Independent 10	42	0.35%	0
Independent 4	17	0.14%	0
Janatha Vimukthi Peramuna	11	0.09%	0
Independent 9	4	0.03%	0
Independent 2	3	0.02%	0
Independent 5	3	0.02%	0
Independent 7	3	0.02%	0
Independent 8	3	0.02%	0
Valid Votes	12,137	100.00%	9
Rejected Votes	313		
Total Polled	12,450		
Registered Electors	16,522		
Turnout	75.35%		

The following candidates were elected: Akeel Arshath K. L.; Abdul Raseed Firous; Abdul Lathief Mahumoothu Lebbe; Ameen Issath Mohideen; Seyed Ali Zahir Moulana (UPFA); Meera Labbey Rebupasam; Poopalaretnam Sasikaran; Mohamed Ismail Mohamed Thasleem (UPFA); and Iramlan Abdul Wasith.

Seyed Ali Zahir Moulana (UPFA) and Mohamed Ismail Mohamed Thasleem (UPFA) were appointed Chairman and Deputy Chairman respectively.
