= 1983 Batticaloa Jailbreak =

1983 Batticaloa Jailbreak happened in Batticaloa, Sri Lanka on 23 September 1983. After the Welikada prison massacre, Tamil political inmates were transferred to Batticaloa. Since they were not co-operating with the police they were told by the prison guards that they were to be transferred back to a Sinhalese area. Fearing death, 41 Tamil political inmates decided to escape. Using smuggled weapons and outside help they overwhelmed the guards and escaped in groups. Using this opportunity 150 criminal inmates also escaped. Prominent political escapees include Ramalingam Paramadeva, Panagoda Maheswaran, Douglas Devananda and few Tamil Tiger sympathisers. This jailbreak was bloodless. The escapees left behind some female political inmates, who were rescued by Ramalingam Paramadeva of the Tamil Tigers in 1984 Batticaloa Jailbreak.

== See also ==
- Black July
- Sri Lankan Civil War
