= Vellavely =

Vellavely வெள்ளாவெளி වැලිවැල්ල
- Town
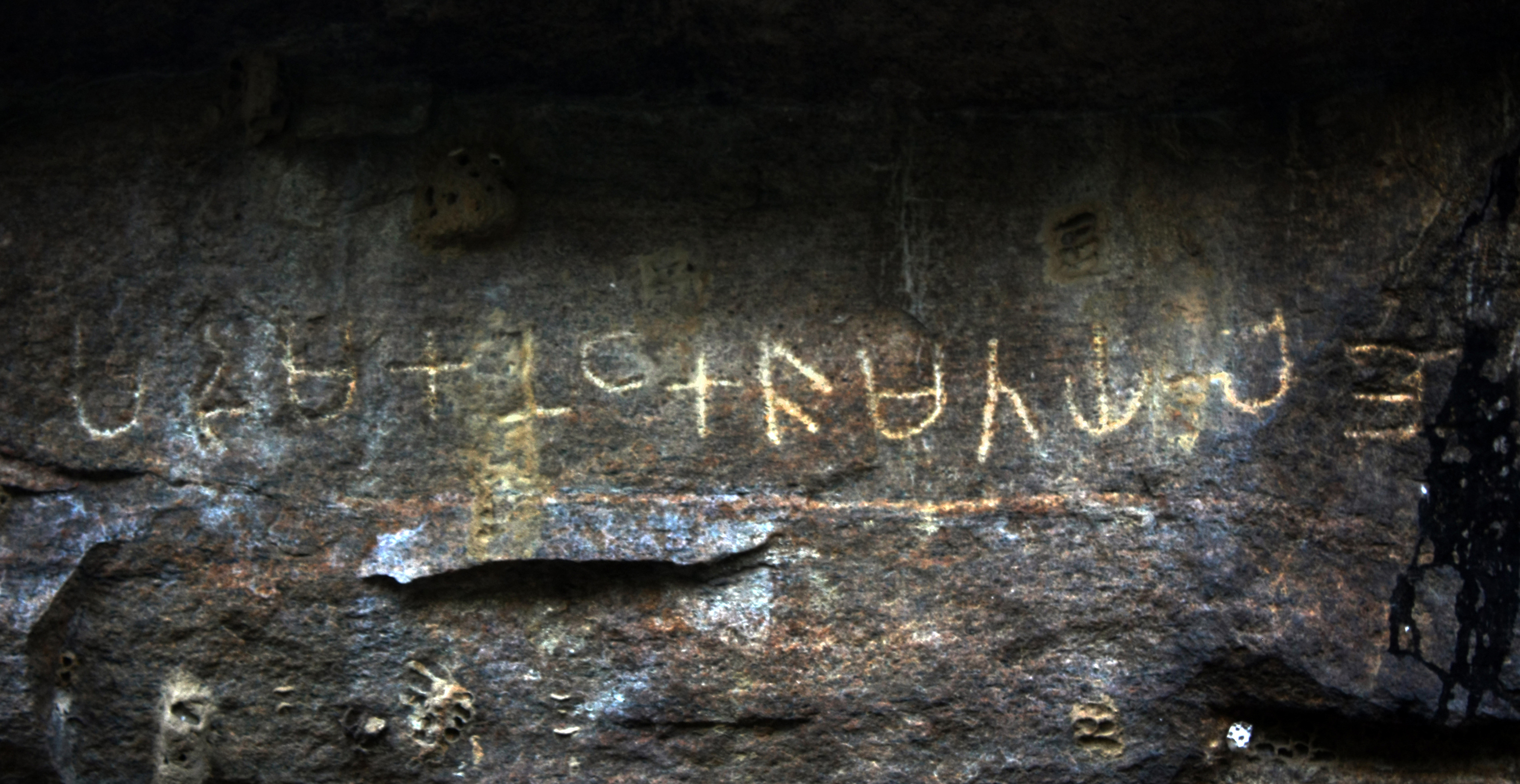
- Vellaveli Brahmi Inscription, Vellaveli

- Location within Sri Lanka
- Coordinates: 7°30′0″N 81°44′0″E
- Country: Sri Lanka
- Province: Eastern
- District: Batticaloa
- DS Division: Poratheevu Pattu

Vellavely or Vellaveli or Vellaaveli (Tamil: வெள்ளாவெளிVellāveḷi, Sinhala: වැලිවැල්ල Velivella) is a town in the Batticaloa District of Sri Lanka, it is located about 30 km south of Batticaloa.

== See also ==
- Kokkadichcholai
