= 1984 Batticaloa Jailbreak =

1984 Batticaloa Jailbreak, was carried out by Ramalingam Paramadeva of Tamil Tigers to release a female political inmate, Nirmala Nithiyananthan, who was left behind in the 1983 Batticaloa Jailbreak, this incident happened on 10 June 1984. Paramadeva and his men dressed in prison guard uniform, fooled & overpowered the guards and released the inmate.

== See also ==
- Welikada prison massacre
- Black July
- Sri Lankan civil war
- LTTE
