= Kokkadichcholai =

Village in Sri Lanka

Kokkadichcholai கொக்கட்டிச்சோலை කොක්කඩිච්චොලය
- Village
- Location within Sri Lanka
- Coordinates: 07°36′51″N 81°42′47″E
- Country: Sri Lanka
- Province: Eastern
- District: Batticaloa
- DS Division: Manmunai South West

Kokkadichcholai (Tamil: கொக்கட்டிச்சோலை) is a village in Batticaloa District in the Eastern Province of Sri Lanka.

== Etymology ==
According to legend, the name of the village comes from the Kokkatti tree.

== Geography ==
The village is located west of the provincial town of Batticaloa across from the lagoon that separates the Batticaloa District's hinterland from the populated coastal area. The general area consists of four villages, one is known as Ampilanthurai, Mahiladitivu and the other Mudalaikudah (Crocodile bay) and the main hamlet of Kokkadichcholai. Although Kokkadichcholai is a collective name for the three hamlets, the name refers to the main hamlet in local parlance. The area is known for its famous Batticaloa curd in Sri Lanka.

Devotees believe that Kokkadicholai Thaanthonreeswarar Temple, located in the area, has been the source of multiple miracles.

On January 27, 1987, the village was the site of the Prawn farm massacre, also known as the 1987 Kokkadichcholai massacre.

== Demography ==
The dominant group is the Mukkuvar caste - mainly farmers, followed by service castes such as dhobys, barbers and others. There is a notion of a self-contained autonomous system of villages, presided over by the Ur-Podiyar, elected from among the Podiyars or village leaders. The role of the Ur Podiyar is considered more ceremonial than authoritative. Podiyars in practice were large landowners. It has become common for people of the area use the prefix with Podiyar with their name. They are largely Hindus, though some among them are Christians as well.

== See also ==
- Prawn farm massacre
- 1991 Kokkadichcholai massacre
