= Navithanveli =

Navithanveli நாவிதன்வெளி
- Location in Sri Lanka
- Coordinates: 7°25′04″N 81°45′07″E
- Country: Sri Lanka
- Province: Eastern Province
- District: Ampara District

Government
  - Type: Navithanveli Divisional Secretariat
- Time zone: UTC+5:30 (Sri Lanka Standard Time)

Navithanveli is a small town in Sri Lanka. It is located within Eastern Province.
