= List of settlements in North Central Province (Sri Lanka) =

The following is a list of settlements in North Central Province, Sri Lanka.

== A ==
Achari Madatugama, Acharigama, Achchirikulama, Achirigama, Achiriyagama

== B ==
Badahela Etawetunuwewa, Badahela Ranorewa, Badahelagama, Bakamuna, Bakamuneulpota

== C ==
Challitivu

== D ==
Dachchi Hammillewa, Dachchidamana, Dachihalmillewa, Dahanekwewa, Damala Hammillewa, Diyabeduma

== E ==
Echchankulama, Egodagama, Ehetuwagama, Ehetuwewa, Elagamuwa

== G ==
Galagedaragama, Galahitiyagama, Galapitagala, Galapitigala, Galatanwewa

== H ==
Haba Diwulwewa, Haba Kudawewa, Habarana, Habarattawala, Habawewa

== I ==
Ichchankulama, Ihala Amanakkattuwa, Ihala Anduketiyawa, Ihala Angunachchiya, Ihala Bakmigahaulpota

== J ==
Jayanthipura

== K ==
Kabaragoyawewa, Kadadekawewa, Kadadekawewa, Kadahatawewa, Kadandugama, Kalawewa, Kekirawa

== L ==
Labunoruwa, Lenagama, Lewapanikkiyawa, Lindawewa, Lokahettiyagama

== M ==
Madagallegama, Madatugama, Madatungama, Madawachchiya, Madawala

== N ==
Nabadagaswewa, Nabadawewa, Nachchaduwa, Nachchaduwa Palayakulama, Nagadaranewa

== O ==
Obadayagama, Ohomigama, Olobbawa, Olombewa, Olugallewa

== P ==
Pachchalawetiya, Padikaramaduwa, Padiketuwewa, Padikkalamadu Colony, Padikkaramaduwa

== R ==
Rada Hammillewa, Rada Rambewa, Radagama, Radagamawatta, Radapalugaswewa

== S ==
Sakalasuriyagama, Samudragama, Sandanankuttigama, Sandigewewa, Sangattewa

== T ==
Talakolawewa, Talakolewa, Talapatkulama, Talattewa, Talawa

== U ==
Uda Hingura, Uda Korasagalla, Uda Negama, Uda Nidigama, Uda Thibbatuwewa

== V ==
Vadivalaipuliyankulam, Valpotuwewa, Vedenigama, Veheragoda, Vendarankulama, Verumkulama, Viharagawagala, Vihare Hammillewa, Vitaranagama

== W ==
Wadigawewa, Wadiwewa, Waduressagama, Waga Konwewa, Wagayakulama

== See also ==
- List of cities in Sri Lanka
- List of towns in Sri Lanka
