= Eravur =

Eravur ஏறாவூர் එරාවූර්
- Town
- Location within Sri Lanka
- Coordinates: 7°46′0″N 81°36′0″E
- Country: Sri Lanka
- Province: Eastern
- District: Batticaloa
- DS Division: Eravur Town

Government
  - Type: Urban Council

Population (2024)
  - Total: 26,468

Eravur is a town in the Batticaloa District of Eastern Province, Sri Lanka. It is located about 14 km (8.7 mi) northwest of Batticaloa. The town is governed by the Eravur Urban Council.

== History ==
Early inhabitants of Eravur were Thimilar, who engaged primarily in paddy cultivation. Mukkuvar people came from India and settled along the sea side. They were involved in fishing and diving for the collection of pearls. The Thimilars opposed the settlement of Mukkuvars, which resulted in a conflict between the two groups. The Thimilars attacked the Mukkuvars while robbing their possessions and kidnapping their women. The Mukkuvars sought help from Pattaniyar, who were Muslims who came from Afghanistan or North India for trading purposes. Both the groups combined to defeat the Thimilars and killed their leader at Satturukonraan.

The Mukkuvars and Pattaniyars formed an alliance to safeguard the town. As they built walls around the area to prevent further attacks, the place was named Eravur (meaning cannot be climbed in Tamil). The Mukkuvars offered seven women from their clan in marriage to the Pattaniyars, who settled in the area near the Eravur Oddu Mosque and Veerapatthira Swami Temple. Eravur became one of the first Muslim settlements in the region and further migration resulted in the spread of Islam in the region.

== Geography and administration ==
Eravur is situated approximately 14 km (8.7 mi) northwest of Batticaloa, in Batticaloa District, Eastern Province. It is bordered by Chenkalady to the west, Batticaloa Lagoon to the south, and Bay of Bengal to the north. The Eravur Urban Council administers the urban area which covers approximately 3 km^{2} (1.2 sq mi), and comprises 15 Grama Niladhari divisions. About 74.6% of the land area is built up, of which residential areas covered 56.3% of the land. Of the remaining area, about 4.3% of the area is cultivated and the remaining is made up of water bodies, and vacant lands.

=== Climate ===
Eravur experiences a tropical dry climate with seasonal rainfall dependent on monsoon. During the northeast monsoon from October to January, the town receives high rainfall and is prone to flash floods. It is also affected by tropical cyclones originating from Bay of Bengal. The average rainfall ranges from 86.4 to 308.1 cm (34.0 to 121.3 in). The average temperature ranges from 24 to 32 °C (75 to 90 °F) and reaches the peak during the summer months from April to August. Dry winds blow from the sea during the summer. While the region has a high humidity due to its location, the nearby lagoon reduces the humidity levels in the area.

== Demographics ==
According to the 2024 census, Eravur had a population of 26,478, comprising 12,218 males and 14,250 females. Sri Lankan Moors (87.2%) and Sri Lankan Tamils (12.2%) formed the majority of the population. Islam is the major religion with 87.3% of the population adhering to it, followed by Hinduism (11.2%).

== Economy ==
Eravur has a diversified local economy involving agriculture, fisheries, and commerce. Fishing is practiced in the lagoon and along the coast. The annual fish production was 44 metric tonnes in 2021. As of 2024, there were 1,865 business activities and 1,922 small scale industries were registered under the Eravur Urban Council.

== Transport ==
Eravur is connected to Batticaloa and Trincomalee via the A15 highway, Chenkaldy and Badulla via the A5 road, and Ratnapura and Wellawaya via the A4 road. The town is also served by the Eravur railway station on the Batticaloa line.
