= Oddamavadi =

Oddamavadi ஓட்டமாவடி ඔට්ටමාවඩි
- Location within Sri Lanka
- Coordinates: 7°55′17″N 81°30′54″E
- Country: Sri Lanka
- Province: Eastern Province
- District: Batticaloa District

Government
  - Type: Koralai Pattu West Divisional Secretariat

Area
  - Land: 176 km^{2} (68 sq mi)

Population (2007)
  - Total: 20,985
  - Density: 341/km^{2} (880/sq mi)
- Time zone: UTC+5:30 (Sri Lanka Standard Time)

Oddamavadi or Oddamavady (Tamil: ஓட்டமாவடி) (Tamil pronunciation: [oːʈʈɚmɑːʋɚɖiː]) (Sinhala: ඕට්ටමාවඩි) is a town in the Eastern Province of Sri Lanka. Twelve villages are located in Oddamavadi which administered under the Koralai Pattu West Divisional Secretariat

Oddamavadi is one of the highest fish producing divisions of Batticaloa. The important landmarks of the town are the 250m Oddamavadi steel bridge, Ameer Alli stadium, and the malty day boat landing site. Oddamavadi is the place where the Valaichchenai lagoon meets the sea. The Valaichchenai fisheries harbour which belongs to koralai pattu is situated in Valeichchenai division witness the big boats in action as well as boat mending and net mending activities.
