= Kaluvanchikudy =

Kaluvanchikudy களுவாஞ்சிக்குடி කලුවන්චිකුඪිය
- நகரம்
- Location within Sri Lanka
- Coordinates: 7°31′3″N 81°47′13″E
- Country: Sri Lanka
- Province: Eastern
- District: Batticaloa
- DS Division: Manmunai South & Eruvil Pattu Divisional Secretariat

Population (2012)
  - Total: 6,119

Kaluwanchikudy (களுவாஞ்சிக்குடி, Kalu-wanchi-kudy) is a town in the Batticaloa District of Sri Lanka. It is located about 30 km southeast of the city of Batticaloa. It is divided into three village officer divisions: Kaluvanchikudy North, Kaluvanchikudy North 1 and Kaluvanchikudy South. According to the 2012 census, it has a total population of 6,119.
