= List of Archaeological Protected Monuments in Mannar District =

This is a list of Archaeological Protected Monuments in Mannar District, Sri Lanka.

Monument	Image	Location	Grama Niladhari Division	Divisional Secretary's Division	Registered	Description	Refs
Doric Bungalow		Silavathurai		Musali			
Illuppaikadavai Padavuthurai		Illuppaikadavai	Illuppaikadavai	Manthai West	25 March 2016	Survey tower	
Irranai Iluppaikulam Sivan Temple		Irranai Iluppaikulam	Irranai Iluppaikulam	Madhu	17 May 2013		
Ketheeswaram Temple		Tiruketheeswaram		Mannar	7 September 1973	Ancient rampart and moat	
Mannar baobab tree		Pallimunai		Mannar	28 January 1955		
Mannar fort				Mannar	11 April 1974		
Mannar Island Lighthouse (old) (Urumalai light house)		Urumalai	Talaimannar Village South	Mannar	25 March 2016	Old light house	
Mundanputti doss house		Mundanputti		Manthai West	17 May 2013	Ancient doss house	
Murunkan Raja Maha Vihara		K. K. Kulam	Iraddaikulam	Nanaddan	17 May 2013	Ruins in vihara	
Murunkan ruins		Murunkan hospital	Murunkan	Nanaddan	17 May 2013	Stone inscription	
Periyapandivirichchan ruins		Periyapandivirichchan	Periyapandivirichchan East	Madhu	17 May 2013	Ruins with hillock covering stupa	
Pillaair Koviltharammadam doss house		Vidattaltivu	Vidattaltivu North	Manthai West	17 May 2013	Ancient doss house	
Sinnakulam ruins		Sinnakulam	Irranai Iluppaikulam	Madhu	12 June 2015	Ruins of buildings	
Sinnapandivirichchan ruins		Sinnapandivirichchan	Madhu	Madhu	17 May 2013		
Talaimannar pier		Talaimannar		Mannar	25 March 2016	Old train pier	
