= Eachalawakkai =

- Town
- Location in the Northern Province
- Coordinates: 8°56′N 80°00′E
- Country: Sri Lanka
- Province: Northern
- District: Mannar

Government
  - Type: Divisional Council
- Time zone: UTC+5:30 (Sri Lanka Standard Time Zone)
- Vehicle registration: NP

Eachalawakkai is a village in the Mannar District, in the northwest of Sri Lanka.

== History ==
Eachalawakkai is one of the villages that falls within the Divisional Secretariat of Manthai. Prior to 2000, the inhabitants of the village were Tamils, who cultivated paddy fields. After 2000 the real settlement of civilization came up to this village. Before the fourth eelam war, the civilians experienced with LTTE administration and been happy. When the final war came, the control of the LTTE was lost from this village. The villagers were displaced to Wellai Mullivaikkal. When the final war ended up on 18 May 2009, the majority of the people of Eachalawakkai were in the refugee camps, and after two years, they have returned to their own home.

== Geography ==
Eachalawakkai is located in the Mannar District of the northwest of Sri Lanka in the Northern Province. It has an area of approximately six square kilometers.

=== Geology, soil, and water ===
Just above the grassland of the dry zone and the soil type is not much vary from the soil of Periamadhu. The water source for drinking is only groundwater containing high calcium. Villagers use some traditional purification methods to treat that water to convert for the drinking purposes. The Eachalawakkai kulam provides irrigation water for the paddy cultivation.

=== Wildlife and plants ===
The Periamadhu Forest reservoir is near to this village, and forest mammals come to the grassland for their food, and at the same time predators also come. The mammals are elephants, foxes, rabbits, deer, bear, monkey. Birds also live along the riparian zone of riversides. Reptiles like king cobra, crocodile, land monitor, snakes, and turtles also exist there. The aquatic organisms like freshwater fishes, prawns, and aquatic plants are there.

== See also ==
- List of towns in Northern Province, Sri Lanka
