= P. Ayngaranesan =

Sri Lankan politician

Honourable P. Ayngaranesan MPC
- பி. ஐங்கரநேசன்
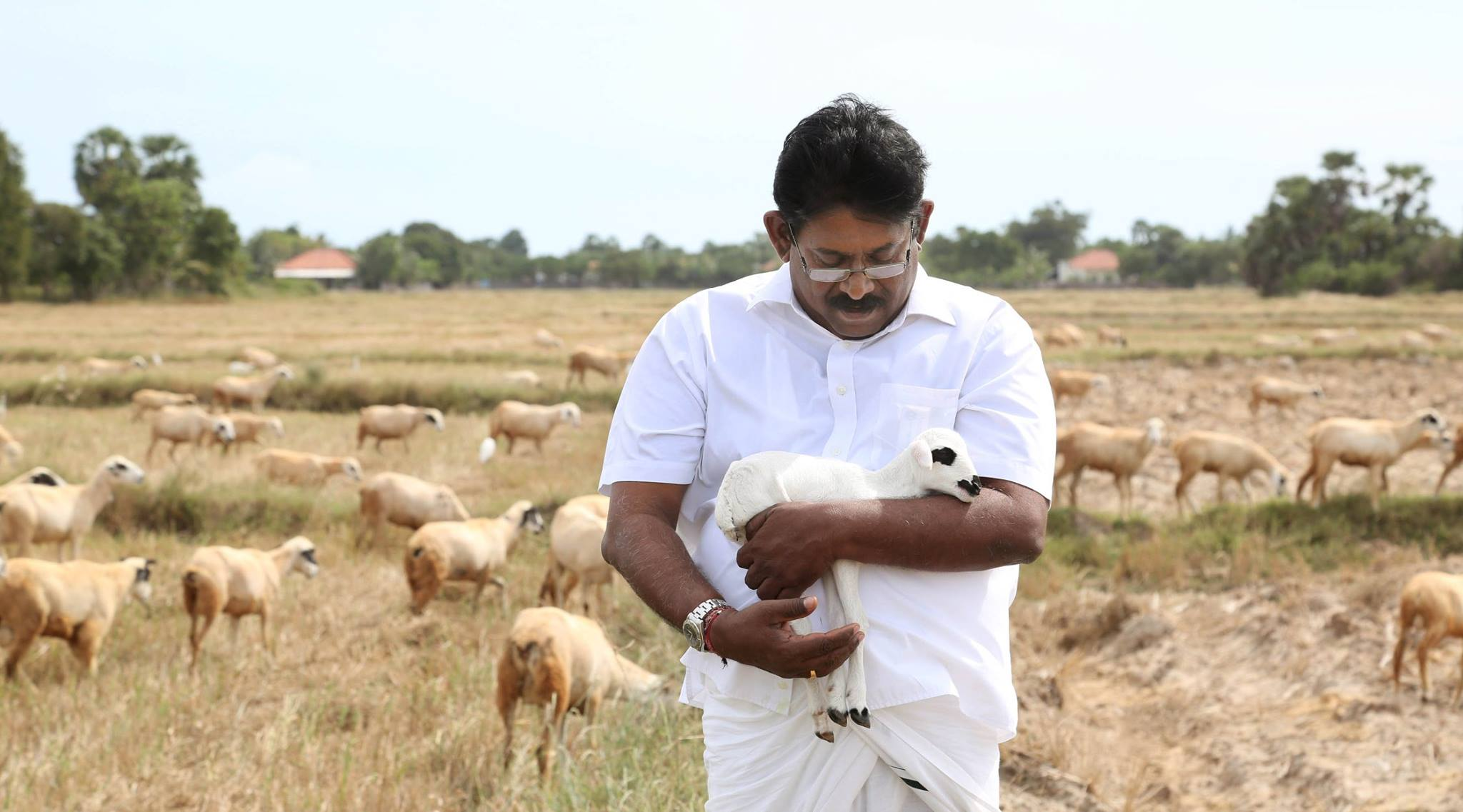
- Ayngaranesan in March 2017

Minister of Agriculture, Livestock, Irrigation and Environment, Northern Province
- In office 11 October 2013 – 15 June 2017
- Succeeded by: C. V. Vigneswaran

Member of the Northern Provincial Council for Jaffna District
- Incumbent
- Assumed office 11 October 2013

Personal details
- Born: 1958 (age 67–68)
- Party: Eelam People's Revolutionary Liberation Front
- Other political affiliations: Tamil National Alliance
- Education: Madras Christian College
- Ethnicity: Sri Lankan Tamil

Ponnudurai Ayngaranesan (Tamil: பொன்னுத்துரை ஐங்கரநேசன், romanized: Poṉṉutturai Aiṅkaranēcaṉ) is a Sri Lankan Tamil environmentalist, politician and former provincial minister.

== Early life and family ==
Ayngaranesan was born in 1958 and educated at Jaffna Hindu College and Madras Christian College.

== Career ==
Ayngaranesan was director of the Universal Science Centre in Kantharmadam. He is an environmentalist.

Ayngaranesan contested the 2013 provincial council election as one of the Tamil National Alliance's candidates in Jaffna District and was elected to the Northern Provincial Council (NPC). After the election he was appointed Minister of Agriculture, Livestock, Irrigation and Environment. He took his oath as minister and provincial councillor in front of Chief Minister C. V. Vigneswaran at Veerasingam Hall on 11 October 2013.

=== Resignation ===
Starting in late 2016, several charges of irregular practices were levelled against the four provincial ministers for Northern Province. Chief Minister Vigneswaran appointed a three-member committee consisting of retired judge S. Thiyakenthiran (chair), retired judge S. Paramarajah and retired District Secretary S. Patmanathan to investigate the charges. In June 2017 the NPC was plunged into chaos after Chief Minister Vigneswaran asked Ayngaranesan and fellow minister T. Kurukularajah to resign after the three-member committee found evidence to substantiate charges of corruption, abuse of power and misuse of funds levelled against the two ministers. Ayngaranesan had been accused of malpractice in connection with renovation of agricultural wells and other irrigation activities. Vigneswaran also requested that the two other ministers, B. Deniswaran and P. Sathiyalingam, who had been exonerated by the committee, to go on leave.

On 14 June 2017 a motion of no confidence against Vigneswaran was handed to Governor Reginald Cooray by several ITAK and opposition members of the NPC. This resulted in the Tamil People's Council, led by Vigneswaran, organising hartals across Northern Province in support of Vigneswaran. Ayngaranesan denied the charges but resigned as minister on 15 June 2017, submitting his resignation to Vigneswaran. He was succeeded by Vigneswaran as minister.

Following mediation by religious leaders a compromise was agreed between Vigneswaran and the ITAK/TNA leadership on 19 June 2017 whereby Vigneswaran would withdraw the request for Deniswaran and Sathiyalingam to go on leave and in return ITAK would withdraw the motion of no confidence against Vigneswaran.
