= Pathmanathan =

Pathmanathan பத்மநாதன்
- Pronunciation: Patmanātaṉ
- Gender: Male
- Language: Tamil

Origin
- Region of origin: Southern India; North-eastern Sri Lanka

Pathmanathan (Tamil: பத்மநாதன்) is a Tamil male given name. Due to the Tamil tradition of using patronymic surnames it may also be a surname for males and females. It is most prevalent in Sri Lanka.

== Notable people ==
=== Given name ===
- K. Pathmanathan (1948–2009), Sri Lankan politician
- S. Pathmanathan (born 1940), Sri Lankan historian and academic

=== Surname ===
- Gajan Pathmanathan (1954–2012), Sri Lankan cricketer
- Pathmanathan Ramanathan (1932–2006), Sri Lankan lawyer and judge
- Pathmanathan Sathiyalingam, Sri Lankan physician and politician
- Terry Pathmanathan (born 1956), Singaporean footballer

=== Alias ===
- Selvarasa Pathmanathan (born 1955), Sri Lankan militant
