= T. Kurukularajah =

Sri Lankan politician

Honourable T. Kurukularajah MPC
- தி. குருகுலராஜா
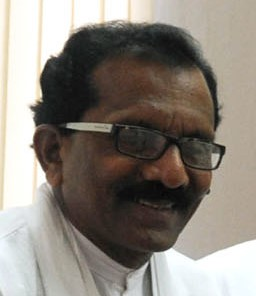
- Kurukularajah in March 2015

Minister of Education, Cultural Affairs and Sports, Northern Province
- In office 11 October 2013 – 20 June 2017
- Succeeded by: C. V. Vigneswaran

Member of the Northern Provincial Council for Kilinochchi District
- Incumbent
- Assumed office 11 October 2013

Personal details
- Party: Illankai Tamil Arasu Kachchi
- Other political affiliations: Tamil National Alliance
- Profession: Civil servant
- Ethnicity: Sri Lankan Tamil

Thambirajah Kurukularajah (Tamil: தம்பிராசா குருகுலராஜா, romanized: Tampirācā Kurukularājā) is a Sri Lankan Tamil civil servant, politician and former provincial minister.

== Early life and family ==
Kurukularajah is the son of Rev. A. C. Thambirajah, a protestant pastor and founder of the Navajeevanam project in Paranthan.

== Career ==
Kurukularajah was director of education for the Kilinochchi Education Zone.

Kurukularajah contested the 2013 provincial council election as one of the Tamil National Alliance's (TNA) candidates in Kilinochchi District and was elected to the Northern Provincial Council (NPC). After the election he was appointed Minister of Education, Cultural Affairs and Sports. He took his oath as minister and provincial councillor in front of Chief Minister C. V. Vigneswaran at Veerasingam Hall on 11 October 2013.

=== Resignation ===
Starting in late 2016, several charges of irregular practices were levelled against the four provincial ministers for Northern Province. Chief Minister Vigneswaran appointed a three-member committee consisting of retired judge S. Thiyakenthiran (chair), retired judge S. Paramarajah and retired District Secretary S. Patmanathan to investigate the charges. In June 2017 the NPC was plunged into chaos after Chief Minister Vigneswaran asked Kurukularajah and fellow minister P. Ayngaranesan to resign after the three-member committee found evidence to substantiate charges of corruption, abuse of power and misuse of funds levelled against the two ministers. Kurukularajah had been accused of irregular transfer of teachers by overruling the ministry secretary and causing the deterioration of the standard of education in the province. Vigneswaran also requested that the two other ministers, B. Deniswaran and P. Sathiyalingam, who had been exonerated by the committee, to go on leave.

Kurukularajah denied the charges but decided to temporarily step down as minister on 13 June 2017, conveying his resignation to his party, the Illankai Tamil Arasu Kachchi (ITAK). However, ITAK leader Mavai Senathirajah refused to accept Kurukularajah's resignation. On 14 June 2017 a motion of no confidence against Vigneswaran was handed to Governor Reginald Cooray by several ITAK and opposition members of the NPC. This resulted in the Tamil People's Council, led by Vigneswaran, organising hartals across Northern Province in support of Vigneswaran.

Following mediation by religious leaders a compromise was agreed between Vigneswaran and the ITAK/TNA leadership on 19 June 2017 whereby Vigneswaran would withdraw the request for Deniswaran and Sathiyalingam to go on leave and in return ITAK would withdraw the motion of no confidence against Vigneswaran. Kurukularajah resigned on 20 June 2017 and was temporarily succeeded by Vigneswaran.
