= B. Deniswaran =

Sri Lankan politician

Honourable B. Deniswaran MPC
- பா. டெனிஸ்வரன்

Minister of Fisheries, Transport, Trade and Rural Development, Northern Province
- In office 11 October 2013 – 23 August 2017
- Succeeded by: K. Sivanesan

Member of the Northern Provincial Council for Mannar District
- Incumbent
- Assumed office 11 October 2013

Personal details
- Party: Tamil Eelam Liberation Organization
- Other political affiliations: Tamil National Alliance
- Profession: Lawyer
- Ethnicity: Sri Lankan Tamil

Balasubramaniam Deniswaran (Tamil: பாலசுப்பிரமணியம் டெனிஸ்வரன்) is a Sri Lankan Tamil lawyer, politician and former provincial minister.

== Career ==
Deniswaran is lawyer. He contested the 2013 provincial council election as one of the Tamil National Alliance's candidates in Mannar District and was elected to the Northern Provincial Council. After the election he was appointed Minister of Fisheries, Transport, Trade and Rural Development. He took his oath as minister and provincial councillor in front of Chief Minister C. V. Vigneswaran at Veerasingam Hall on 11 October 2013.

=== Dismissal ===
Starting in late 2016, several charges of irregular practices were levelled against the four provincial ministers for Northern Province. Chief Minister Vigneswaran appointed a three-member committee consisting of retired judge S. Thiyakenthiran (chair), retired judge S. Paramarajah and retired District Secretary S. Patmanathan to investigate the charges. In June 2017 the NPC was plunged into chaos after Chief Minister Vigneswaran asked P. Ayngaranesan and T. Kurukularajah to resign after the three-member committee found evidence to substantiate charges of corruption, abuse of power and misuse of funds levelled against the two ministers. Vigneswaran also requested that the two other ministers, Deniswaran and P. Sathiyalingam, who had been exonerated by the committee, to go on leave.

On 14 June 2017 a motion of no confidence against Vigneswaran was handed to Governor Reginald Cooray by several ITAK and opposition members of the NPC. This resulted in the Tamil People's Council, led by Vigneswaran, organising hartals across Northern Province in support of Vigneswaran. Following mediation by religious leaders a compromise was agreed between Vigneswaran and the ITAK/TNA leadership on 19 June 2017 whereby Vigneswaran would withdraw the request for Deniswaran and Sathiyalingam to go on leave and in return ITAK would withdraw the motion of no confidence against Vigneswaran. The central committee of Tamil Eelam Liberation Organization met on 20 August 2017 and suspended Deniswaran from the party for six months. He was removed from his ministerial position on 23 August 2017. Deniswaran has however written to Cooray, challenging the legality of the removal.
