= P. Sathiyalingam =

Sri Lankan politician

Honourable P. Sathiyalingam MPC
- பி. சத்தியலிங்கம்
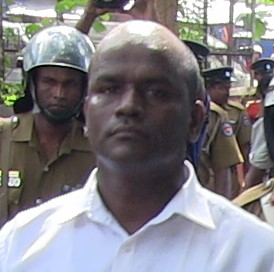
- Sathiyalingam in August 2013

Minister of Health and Indigenous Medicine, Northern Province
- In office 11 October 2013 – 7 August 2017
- Succeeded by: G. Gunaseelan

Member of the Northern Provincial Council for Vavuniya District
- Incumbent
- Assumed office 11 October 2013

Personal details
- Party: Illankai Tamil Arasu Kachchi
- Other political affiliations: Tamil National Alliance
- Profession: Physician
- Ethnicity: Sri Lankan Tamil

Pathmanathan Sathiyalingam (Tamil: பத்மநாதன் சத்தியலிங்கம்) is a Sri Lankan Tamil physician, politician and former provincial minister.

== Early life and family ==
Sathiyalingam is the son of S. Pathmanathan, a communist who contested the 1970 parliamentary election in Vavuniya.

== Career ==
Sathiyalingam was Medical Officer of Health (MOH) for Vavuniya. He is chairman of the Vavuniya branch of the Sri Lanka Red Cross Society.

Pathmanathan contested the 2013 provincial council election as one of the Tamil National Alliance's candidates in Vavuniya District and was elected to the Northern Provincial Council. After the election he was appointed Minister of Health and Indigenous Medicine. He took his oath as minister and provincial councillor in front of Chief Minister C. V. Vigneswaran at Veerasingam Hall on 11 October 2013.

=== Resignation ===
Starting in late 2016, several charges of irregular practices were levelled against the four provincial ministers for Northern Province. Chief Minister Vigneswaran appointed a three-member committee consisting of retired judge S. Thiyakenthiran (chair), retired judge S. Paramarajah and retired District Secretary S. Patmanathan to investigate the charges. In June 2017 the NPC was plunged into chaos after Chief Minister Vigneswaran asked P. Ayngaranesan and T. Kurukularajah to resign after the three-member committee found evidence to substantiate charges of corruption, abuse of power and misuse of funds levelled against the two ministers. Vigneswaran also requested that the two other ministers, B. Deniswaran and Sathiyalingam, who had been exonerated by the committee, to go on leave.

On 14 June 2017 a motion of no confidence against Vigneswaran was handed to Governor Reginald Cooray by several ITAK and opposition members of the NPC. This resulted in the Tamil People's Council, led by Vigneswaran, organising hartals across Northern Province in support of Vigneswaran. Following mediation by religious leaders a compromise was agreed between Vigneswaran and the ITAK/TNA leadership on 19 June 2017 whereby Vigneswaran would withdraw the request for Deniswaran and Sathiyalingam to go on leave and in return ITAK would withdraw the motion of no confidence against Vigneswaran. ITAK provincial councillors met on 6 August 2017 and decided not to take any ministerial positions in Vigneswaran's administration. Sathiyalingam resigned on 7 August 2017.
