= G. Gunaseelan =

Sri Lankan politician

Honourable G. Gunaseelan MPC

Minister of Health and Indigenous Medicine and Probation and Childcare Services, Northern Province
- Incumbent
- Assumed office 23 August 2017
- Preceded by: P. Sathiyalingam

Member of the Northern Provincial Council for Mannar District
- Incumbent
- Assumed office 14 October 2013

Personal details
- Party: Tamil Eelam Liberation Organization
- Other political affiliations: Tamil National Alliance
- Profession: Physician
- Ethnicity: Sri Lankan Tamil

Gnanaseelan Gunaseelan is a Sri Lankan Tamil physician, politician and provincial minister.

Gunaseelan was Medical Officer of Health (MOH) for Manthai West and Madhu.

Gunaseelan contested the 2013 provincial council election as one of the Tamil National Alliance's candidates in Mannar District and was elected to the Northern Provincial Council. After the election he was appointed to assist the Minister of Health and Indigenous Medicine on food supply. He took his oath as provincial councillor in front of Chief Minister C. V. Vigneswaran at his residence in Colombo on 14 October 2013.

Sarveswaran was sworn in as Minister of Health and Indigenous Medicine and Probation and Childcare Services in front of Governor Reginald Cooray on 23 August 2017.
