= Vankalai Sanctuary =

Site in Sri Lanka

Vankalai Sanctuary Wetland
- Wetland
- Coordinates: 8°56′N 79°55′E
- Location: Vankalai, Mannar, Sri Lanka
- Part of: Mannar District

Area
  - Total: 4,839 hectares (11,960 acres)

Ramsar Wetland
- Official name: Vankalai Sanctuary
- Designated: 12 July 2010
- Reference no.: 1910

Vankalai Sanctuary, also known as the Mannar Bird Sanctuary, is located in the northwest of Sri Lanka in the Mannar District. This site covers an area of 4,839 ha (11,960 acres).

The region was designated as a sanctuary by the Department of Wildlife Conservation in 2008, and it offers a range of ecosystems (mangroves, salt marshes, lagoons, waterholes, and grasslands). In July 2010 it was selected as the fourth Ramsar wetland in Sri Lanka.

The sanctuary harbours more than 150 distinct bird species, including the northern pintail (Anas acuta), Greater Flamingo (Phoenicopterus roseus), the Eurasian wigeon (Anas Penelope), Indian spot-billed duck (Anas poecilorhyncha), comb duck (Sarkidiornis sylvicola), long-toed stint (Calidris subminuta), peregrine falcon (Falco peregrinus), and black-tailed godwit (Limosa limosa). The marine ecosystem has over sixty species of fish, marine turtles, and threatened species such as dugong (Dugong dugon) green sea turtle (Chelonia mydas), and saltwater Crocodile (Crocodylus porosus).

== See also ==
- Muthurajawela wetlands
