= Mannar Urban Council =

Mannar Urban Council மன்னார் நகர சபை

Type
- Type: Local authority

Leadership
- Chairman: Santhanpillai Gnanaprgasam, TNA since March 2011
- Deputy Chairman: Sebastiyampillai Jemes Firansis Jesuthasan, TNA since March 2011
- Seats: 7

Elections
- Last election: 2011 Sri Lankan local government elections

Mannar Urban Council (Tamil: மன்னார் நகர சபை Maṉṉār Nakara Capai; MUC) is the local authority for the town of Mannar in north-western Sri Lanka. MUC is responsible for providing a variety of local public services including roads, sanitation, drains, housing, libraries, public parks and recreational facilities. It has 7 members elected using the open list proportional representation system.

== History ==
Mannar Urban Council was created with effect from 15 April 2006 from parts of Mannar Divisional Council. However, according to the pro-LTTE TamilNet, the Sri Lankan government had suspended all local government in the north and east of the country in 1983 using emergency regulations. The civil war prevented elections from being held for MUC until 2011..

On 27 January 2006 local authority elections were called for the entire country. It was later announced that elections would be held on 30 March 2006 across the entire country. The Election Commissioner subsequently postponed the elections in the north and Batticaloa District until 30 September 2006. On 23 September 2006 elections in the north and Batticaloa District were postponed until 30 June 2007.

MUC continued to be administered by special commissioners until the 2011 elections.

== Election results ==
=== 2011 local government election ===
Results of the local government election held on 17 March 2011:

Alliances and parties	Votes	%	Seats
Tamil National Alliance (ITAK, EPRLF (S), TELO, PLOTE, TULF, TNLA)	4,757	58.60%	5
United People's Freedom Alliance (ACMC, EPDP et al.)	2,848	35.08%	2
United National Party	272	3.35%	0
Independent 1	236	2.91%	0
Independent 2	5	0.06%	0
Valid Votes	8,118	100.00%	7
Rejected Votes	345		
Total Polled	8,463		
Registered Electors	15,979		
Turnout	52.96%		

The following candidates were elected: Santhanpillai Gnanaprgasam (TNA); Sebastiyampillai Jemes Firansis Jesuthasan (TNA); Nilamutheen Nahusheen (UPFA); Anthony Charles Morines Perera (TNA); Subramaniyam Pirunthavananathan (TNA); Sampooranam Rathinasingam (TNA); and Selvarasa Selvakumar (UPFA).

Santhanpillai Gnanaprgasam (TNA) and Sebastiyampillai Jemes Firansis Jesuthasan (TNA) were appointed Chairman and Deputy Chairman respectively.
