= Mannar District =

Mannar District மன்னார் மாவட்டம் මන්නාරම දිස්ත්‍රික්කය
- Administrative District
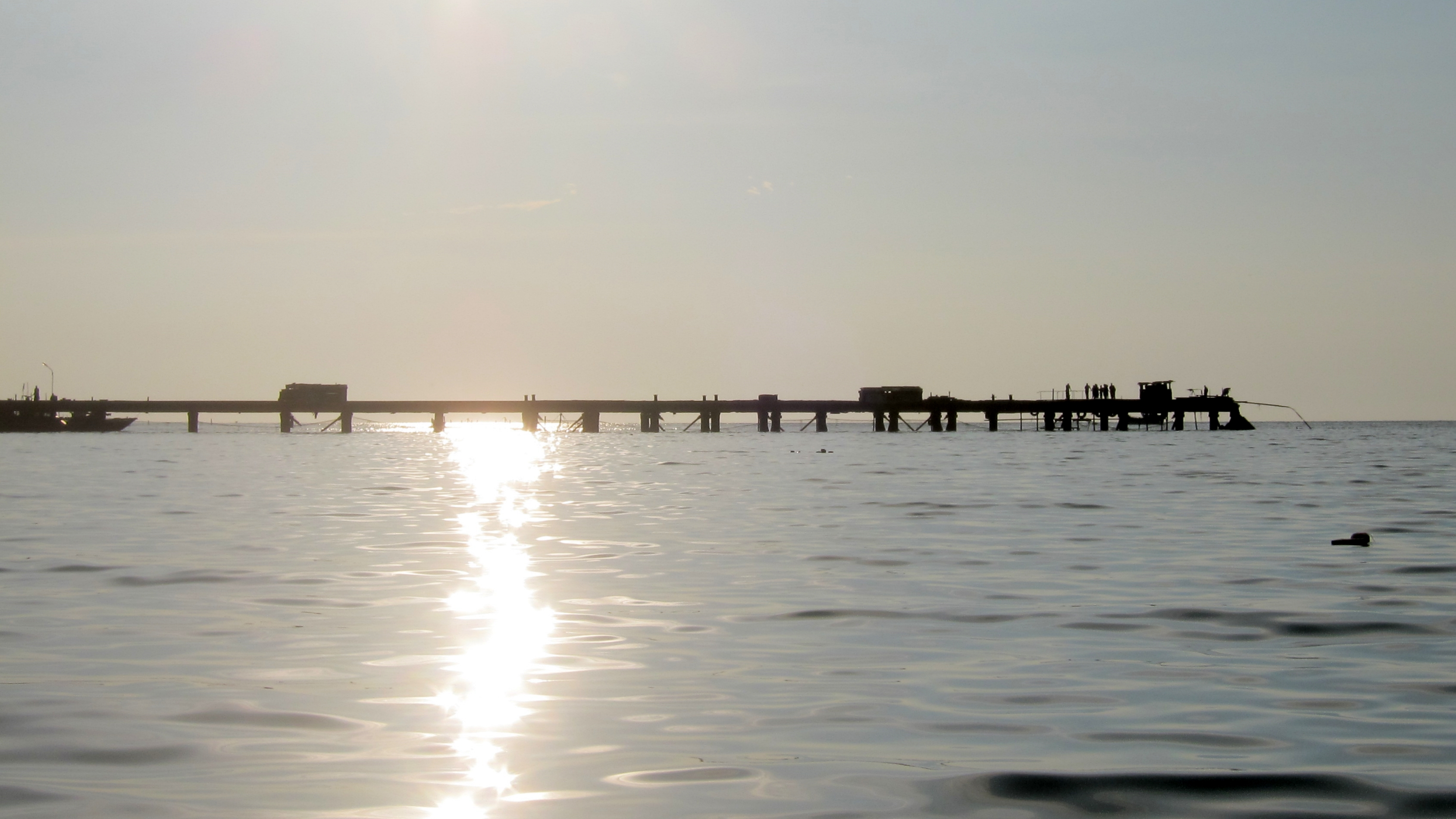

- Location within Sri Lanka

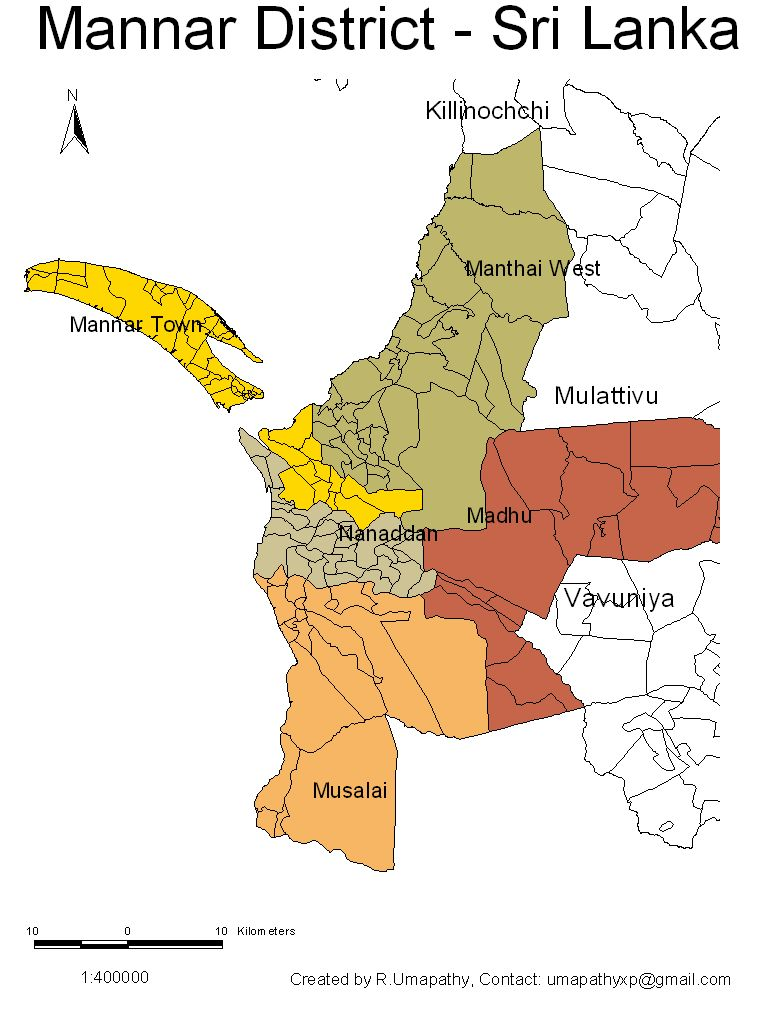
- DS and GN Divisions of Mannar District, 2006
- Coordinates: 08°52′N 80°04′E
- Country: Sri Lanka
- Province: Northern
- Capital: Mannar
- DS Division: List: Madhu; Mannar; Manthai West; Musali; Nanaddan

Government
  - District Secretary: C. A. Mohan Ras
  - MPs: List: Selvam Adaikalanathan; Sivasakthy Ananthan; Risad Badhiutheen; Hunais Farook; Muthali Bawa Farook; Vino Noharathalingam
  - MPCs: List: B. Deniswaran; G. Gunaseelan; S. M. Rasik; A. A. Rizwhan; S. R. P. Sraiva

Area
  - Total: 1,996 km^{2} (771 sq mi)
  - Land: 1,880 km^{2} (730 sq mi)
  - Water: 116 km^{2} (45 sq mi) 5.81%
  - Rank: 13th (3.04% of total area)

Population (2012 census)
  - Total: 99,051
  - Rank: 24th (0.49% of total pop.)
  - Density: 52.7/km^{2} (136/sq mi)

Ethnicity (2012 census)
  - Sri Lankan Tamil: 80,568 (81.34%)
  - Sri Lankan Moors: 16,087 (16.24%)
  - Sinhalese: 1,961 (1.98%)
  - Indian Tamil: 394 (0.40%)
  - Other: 41 (0.04%)

Religion (2012 census)
  - Christian: 56,932 (57.48%)
  - Hindu: 23,464 (23.69%)
  - Muslim: 16,553 (16.71%)
  - Buddhist: 2,066 (2.09%)
  - Other: 36 (0.04%)
- Time zone: UTC+05:30 (Sri Lanka)
- Post Codes: 41000-41999
- Telephone Codes: 023
- ISO 3166 code: LK-43
- Vehicle registration: NP
- Official Languages: Tamil, Sinhala
- Website: Mannar District Secretariat

Mannar District (Tamil: மன்னார் மாவட்டம் Maṉṉār Māvaṭṭam; Sinhala: මන්නාරම දිස්ත්‍රික්කය) is one of the 25 districts of Sri Lanka, the second level administrative division of the country. The district is administered by a District Secretariat headed by a District Secretary (previously known as a Government Agent) appointed by the central government of Sri Lanka. The capital of the district is Mannar, which is located on Mannar Island.

== History ==
Between the 5th century BC and 13th century AD, what is now Mannar District was part of Rajarata. Parts of Mannar District were thereafter part of the pre-colonial Jaffna kingdom. The district then came under Portuguese, Dutch and British control. In 1815 the British gained control of the entire island of Ceylon. They divided the island into three ethnic based administrative structures: Low Country Sinhalese, Kandyan Sinhalese and Tamil. The district was part of the Tamil administration. In 1833, in accordance with the recommendations of the Colebrooke-Cameron Commission, the ethnic based administrative structures were unified into a single administration divided into five geographic provinces. Mannar District, together with Jaffna District and Vanni District, formed the new Northern Province.

At the time that Ceylon gained independence, Mannar was one of the three districts located in the Northern Province. Manthai East division was transferred to newly created Mullaitivu District in September 1978.

Much of Mannar District was under the control of rebel Liberation Tigers of Tamil Eelam for many years during the civil war. The entire district was recaptured by the Sri Lankan military in 2008.

== Geography ==
Mannar District is located in the north west of Sri Lanka in the Northern Province. It has an area of 1,996 square kilometres (771 sq mi).

=== Geology, soil and water ===
Murunkan (English = cracked earth) is due to the black clay surface which is cracked while dry, is the place where the Giant's Tank is situated. It has montmorillonite clay and is the only place in Sri Lanka where this kind of clay can be obtained. This clay is used in making cement.

Aruvi Aru is the second longest river in Sri Lanka and runs through Mannar and Anuradhapura districts.

Mannar has artesian springs and aquifers. These water supply comes from Sri Lanka's central areas. The Northern Province has a supply of fresh water from aquifers and it was used in successful cultivation. It only exists in the areas where red yellow latosol exists. These types of aquifers do not exist where reddish brown earth is found. The rest of the Vanni area is void of perennial supply of fresh water.

== Flora and fauna ==
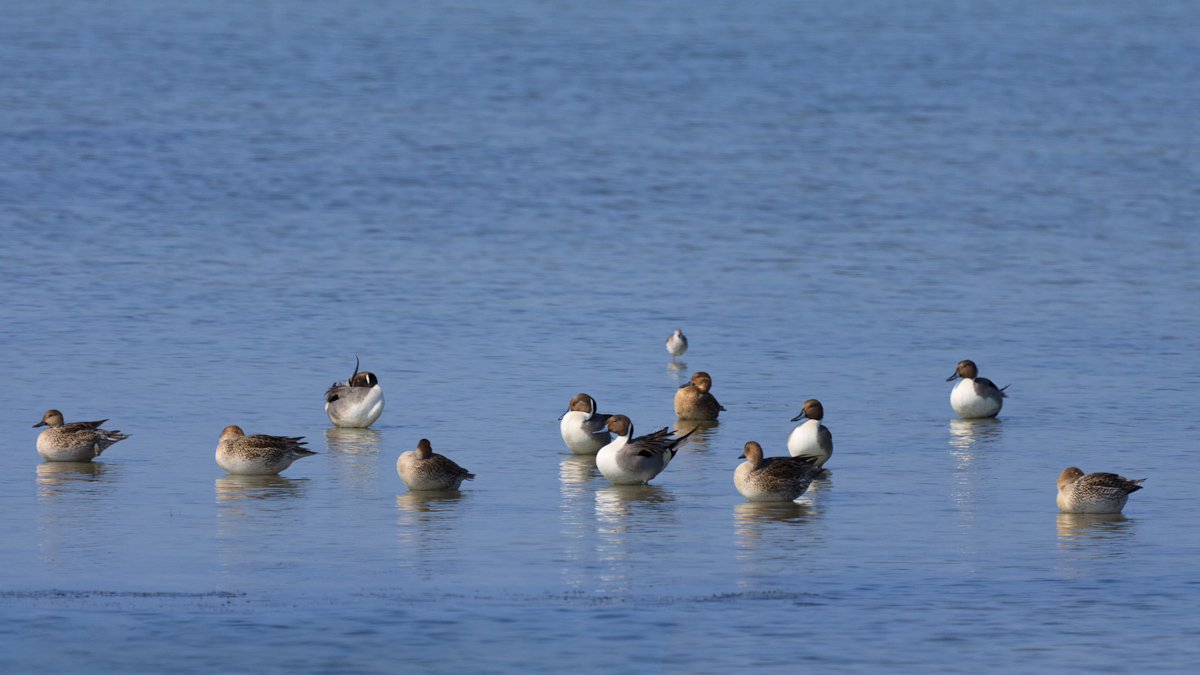
Northern pintail in Mannar District

Mannar District is unique in its vegetation and wildlife, contrasting with rest of Sri Lanka.

Mannar Island is one of the few places in Sri Lanka where baobab trees thrive. Monkeys love the fruit and hence the tree is sometimes known as the monkey-bread tree.

The dugong is a medium-sized marine mammal which is found in Mannar Bay, Nachchikuda, Jaffna island and near Adam's Bridge. IUCN conservation status is vulnerable because of over-hunting for food and accidental capture in fishing nets.

A critically endangered tarantula species known as Poecilotheria hanumavilasumica was first found from Sri Lanka in Mannar region. This was the first time that the spider was recorded from outside of India

The Vankalai Sanctuary for birds, internationally recognised as an important area for wetland birds under the Ramsar Convention, is on the mainland just to the south of Mannar Island.

== Administrative units ==
Mannar District is divided into 5 Divisional Secretary's Division (DS Divisions), each headed by a Divisional Secretary (previously known as an Assistant Government Agent). The DS Divisions are further sub-divided into 153 Grama Niladhari Divisions (GN Divisions).

DS Division	Main Town	Divisional Secretary	GN Divisions	Area (km^{2})	Population (2012 Census)						Population Density (/km^{2})
DS Division	Main Town	Divisional Secretary	GN Divisions	Area (km^{2})	Sri Lankan Tamil	Sri Lankan Moors	Sinhalese	Indian Tamil	Other	Total	Population Density (/km^{2})
Madhu	Madhu	F. C. Sathiyasothy	17	553	6,793	559	273	5	1	7,631	14
Mannar	Mannar	Paramadoss	49	212	40,865	8,982	953	131	6	50,937	240
Manthai West	Adampan	S. Ketheeswaran	36	608	12,993	1,123	337	177	0	14,630	24
Musali	Chilawathurai	K.S. Vasanthakumar	20	475	3,042	4,818	147	2	0	8,009	17
Nanaddan	Nanaddan	Manikkavasakar Sriskanthakumar	31	148	16,875	605	251	79	34	17,844	121
Total			153	1,996	80,568	16,087	1,961	394	41	99,051	50

== Demographics ==
=== Population ===
Mannar District's population was 99,051 in 2012. The population of the district is mostly Sri Lankan Tamil.

The population of the district, like the rest of the north and east of Sri Lanka, has been heavily affected by the civil war. The war killed an estimated 100,000 people. Several hundred thousand Sri Lankan Tamils, possibly as much as one million, emigrated to the West during the war. Many Sri Lankan Tamils also moved to the relative safety of the capital Colombo. Most of the Sri Lankan Moors and Sinhalese who lived in the district fled to other parts of Sri Lanka or were forcibly expelled by the rebel Liberation Tigers of Tamil Eelam, though most of them have returned to the district since the end of the civil war.

=== Ethnicity ===
Population of Mannar District by ethnic group 1881 to 2012
Year	Tamil (Note: Sri Lankan Tamil and Indian Tamil.)		Muslim (Note: Sri Lankan Moors and Indian Moors.)		Sinhalese		Other		Total No.
Year	No.	%	No.	%	No.	%	No.	%	Total No.
1881 Census	14,415	67.52%	6,635	31.08%	142	0.67%	156	0.73%	21,348
1891 Census	16,098	65.68%	7,643	31.18%	592	2.42%	178	0.73%	24,511
1901 Census	16,848	67.59%	7,715	30.95%	201	0.81%	162	0.65%	24,926
1911 Census	16,731	65.35%	8,092	31.61%	639	2.50%	141	0.55%	25,603
1921 Census	16,949	66.25%	8,002	31.28%	538	2.10%	93	0.36%	25,582
1946 Census	19,623	62.22%	10,410	33.01%	1,186	3.76%	319	1.01%	31,538
1963 Census	40,140	66.70%	17,260	28.68%	2,262	4.35%	160	0.27%	60,180
1971 Census	53,353	68.50%	20,878	26.81%	3,568	4.58%	83	0.11%	77,882
1981 Census	68,178	63.75%	28,464	26.62%	8,710	8.14%	1,588	1.48%	106,940
2000 Estimate	n/a	n/a	n/a	n/a	n/a	n/a	n/a	n/a	96,667
2001 Estimate (Note: 2001 Census was not carried out in Mannar District.)	92,911	94.84%	5,038	5.14%	16	0.02%	0	0.00%	97,965
2002 Estimate	86,153	93.52%	5,934	6.44%	31	0.03%	0	0.00%	92,118
2003 Estimate	92,129	93.24%	6,649	6.73%	35	0.04%	0	0.00%	98,813
2004 Estimate	n/a	n/a	n/a	n/a	n/a	n/a	n/a	n/a	102,135
2005 Estimate	n/a	n/a	n/a	n/a	n/a	n/a	n/a	n/a	103,936
2006 Estimate	n/a	n/a	n/a	n/a	n/a	n/a	n/a	n/a	103,671
2007 Estimate	95,560	92.16%	8,073	7.79%	55	0.05%	0	0.00%	103,688
2008 Estimate	67,503	89.11%	8,214	10.84%	38	0.05%	0	0.00%	75,755
2009 Estimate	80,781	85.97%	13,144	13.99%	36	0.04%	0	0.00%	93,961
2011 Enumeration	78,789	82.56%	16,130	16.90%	455	0.48%	56	0.06%	95,430
2012 Census	80,962	81.74%	16,087	16.24%	1,961	1.98%	41	0.04%	99,051

=== Religion ===
Population of Mannar District by religion 1981 to 2012
Year	Christian (Note: Roman Catholic and Other Christian.)		Hindu		Muslim		Buddhist		Others		Total No.
Year	No.	%	No.	%	No.	%	No.	%	No.	%	Total No.
1981 Census	44,689	42.07%	28,895	27.20%	29,161	27.45%	3,363	3.17%	127	0.12%	106,235
2012 Census	56,932	57.48%	23,464	23.69%	16,553	16.71%	2,066	2.09%	36	0.04%	99,051

==== Catholicism ====
Mannar is a predominantly Catholic Christian area. There was equal amount of Muslim population and a few Sinhalase before 1990. Portuguese rule introduced Christianity and Hindu temples were simply changed into Catholic Churches and Forts. The whole of southern coastal India and western coast of Sri Lanka is a Catholic stronghold from the time of Portuguese colonisation. Now, Sri Lanka's western coast is predominantly Buddhist while most coastal regions of India practise Hinduism except Goa. Buddhism, Hinduism and Islam may be present in small patches.

==== Christian churches ====
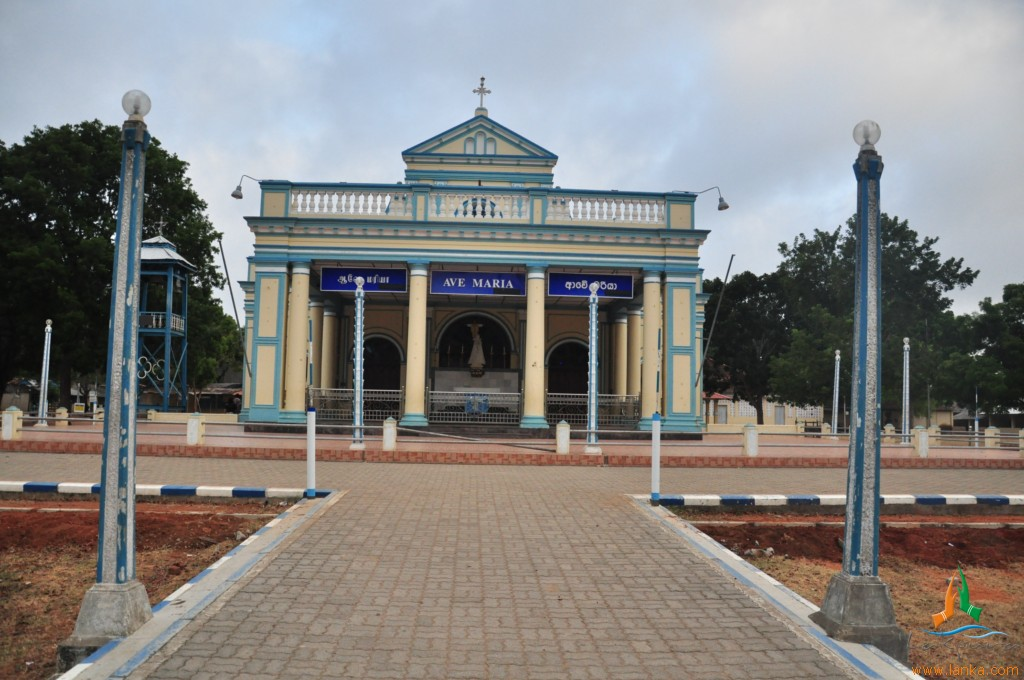
Shrine of Our Lady of Madhu

Mannar is part of the 'Catholic Belt' extending from Negombo to Jaffna. Portuguese first arrived in Colombo and established Catholicism in areas around Chilaw and further expanded their rule into Nagar Kovil, Kanyakumari and Tuticorin area. Thus the whole of Gulf of Mannar could be called a Catholic Belt.

The ancient Madu Church is one of the ancient churches in Asia and located near Murunkan. An ancient Kali Temple was demolished by Portuguese to construct the Catholic Church on the same location.

Pesalai Catholic Church is one of the largest church in Sri Lanka, which was rebuilt after year-2000. Alleged recent human rights violations by Sri Lanka Army and the LTTE attacks have brought it to the media attention internationally. (see 2006 Mannar massacres)

Vidathaltheevu St James Church also one of the big church in Mannar Diocese . It has a history of more than 400 years. Now also there are some ancient materials inside the church boundary which were protected and maintained by the very people who live in the suburb. Now the Church is being reconstructed by the village people.

There are also few Protestant/Christian Churches in Mannar. Methodist is one of a Senior church started in Mannar in the history and the Ceylon Pentecostal Mission is second to it. The Gospel Grace Church was started in 1984. My Saviour's Church, Philedephiya Full Gospel Church, Assemble of God & Christian Fellowship Church are also old churches in Mannar more than 10 years.

==== Hinduism ====
Two great Sivan temples in Mannar were demolished by Portuguese. The new Thiruketheeswaram is built after the independence and it houses all the archeological finds of Hindu artefacts unearthed in the area. Several Hindu celebereties have visited Thiruketheeswaram including Appar, Sundarar and Sambanthar.

==== Islam ====
Mannar had a large Moor population for a long time before the forced expulsion of Muslims by the LTTE in 1990. Muslims did not support a separate Tamil Eelam.

In 1503, Vasco Da Gama expelled all the Muslims during his rule of Indian Portuguese Territory as part of the war against Turkey and its allies. At that time Hindu kings were ruling Jaffna Kingdom and Muslim refugees who fled from Portuguese rule were accepted in Mannar as a safe haven. Mukkuvars who were at war with Portuguese also came from Kerala and Cochin to escape the ethnic cleansing by Portuguese. Mannar also had a Muslim Member of Parliament. Human tragedy of 1990 involved in the expulsion resulted in Muslims walking 50 kilometers to the safety of Puttalam through Wilpattu National Park.

== Politics and government ==
=== Local government ===
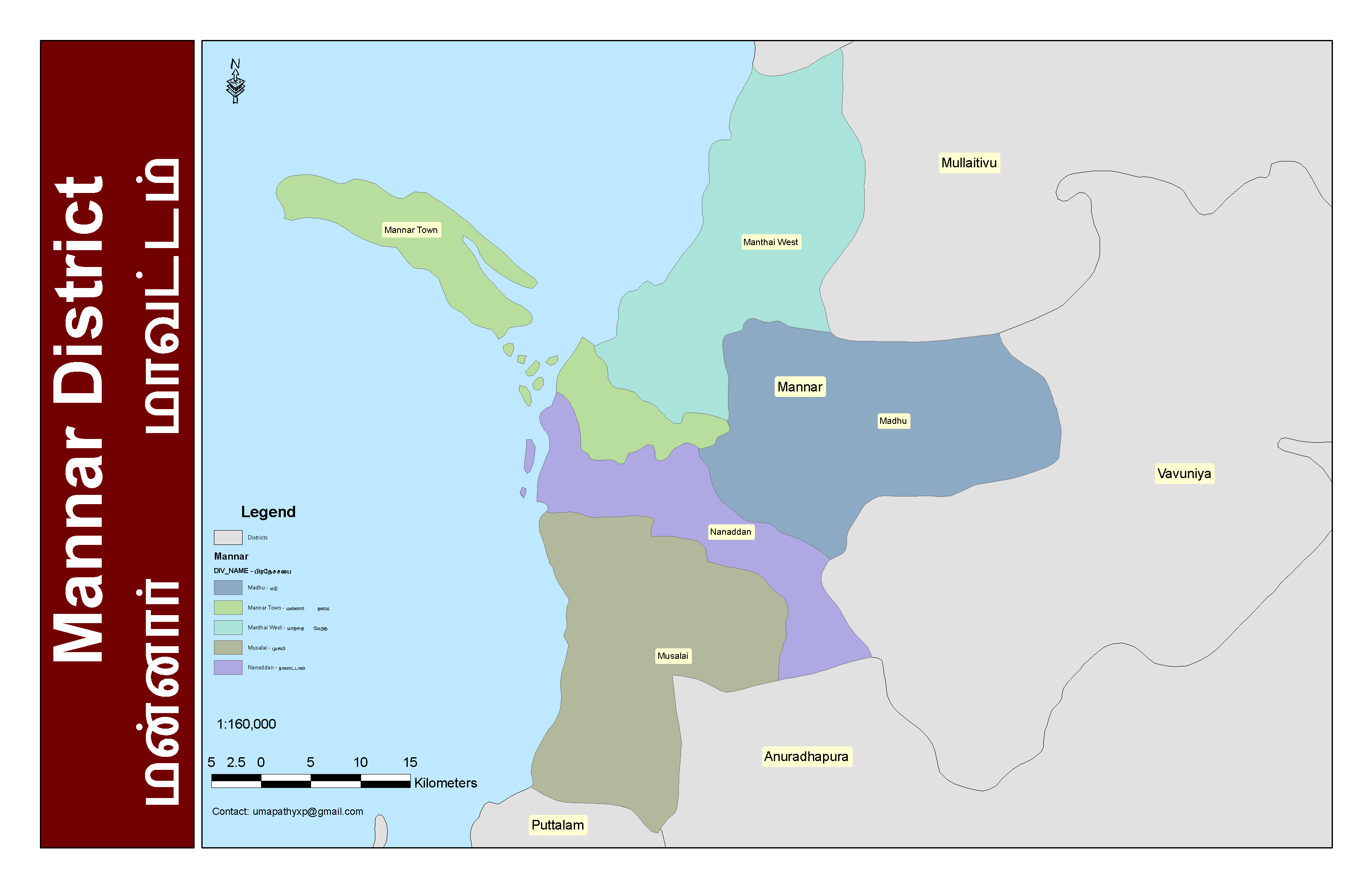
DS Divisions of Mannar District, 2006

Mannar District has 5 local authorities of which one is an Urban Council and the remaining 4 are Divisional Councils (Pradesha Sabhai or Pradeshiya Sabha).

Local Authority	Area (km^{2})	Population (2011)	Registered Electors (2011)	Elected Members (2011)			
Local Authority	Area (km^{2})	Population (2011)	Registered Electors (2011)	TNA (Note: Includes TULF.)	UPFA	SLMC	Total
Mannar Divisional Council	189.35	25,393	24,658	5	2	2	9
Mannar Urban Council	27.85	22,183	15,979	5	2	0	7
Manthai West Divisional Council	1,181.33	19,395	18,707	7	4	1	12
Musali Divisional Council	474.74	8,212	13,151	1	6	2	9
Nanaddan Divisional Council	256.10	20,247	16,421	6	3	0	9
Total	2,129.37	95,430	88,916	24	17	5	46

== Economy ==
=== Mannar Harbour ===
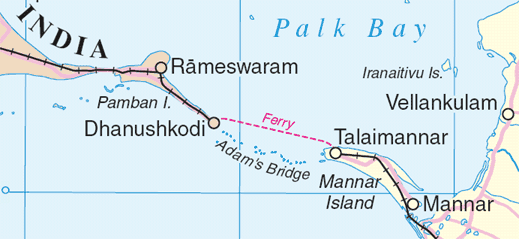
Rama's Bridge

Mannar has an ancient port which needs to be expanded into a large harbour like Rameshwaram Harbour. The present 'Sethusamudram Project' by the Indian Government will bring 90% of the shipping traffic very near to the Mannar Harbour.

The strategic advantages derive from obtaining a navigable sea route close to the coast, with a reduction in travel distance of more than 350 nautical miles (650 km) (for larger ships). The project is expected to provide a boost to the economic and industrial development of coastal Tamil Nadu. The project will be of particular significance to Jaffna, Kankesanthurai, Mannar, Point Pedro and Tuticorin harbour. Tuticurin has the potential to transform itself into a nodal port. The Tamil Nadu Government has announced its proposal to develop 13 minor ports, including Ennore, Cuddalore, Nagapattinam, Thondi, Valinokam, Kolachel and Kanyakumari.

Development of the canal and ports is also expected to provide increased maritime security for Tamil Nadu and Sri Lanka.

All the other harbours of Sri Lanka will get bypassed by the ships and Indian harbours will be servicing the shipping traffic. As such a hundred million dollar project needs to be started to build a modern harbour in Mannar to compete. The location of such a harbour can be on the northern side and southern side of Mannar as both the sides can cater for deep sea vessels.

The project has been criticised by some environmentalists.
