= Madhu Divisional Secretariat =

- Divisional Secretariat
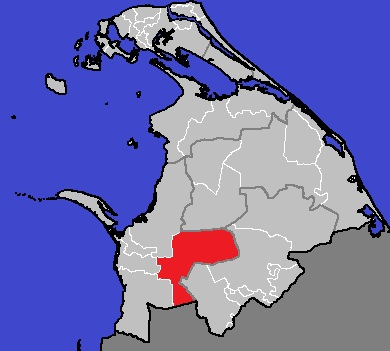
- Country: Sri Lanka
- Province: Northern Province
- District: Mannar District
- Time zone: UTC+5:30 (Sri Lanka Standard Time)

Madhu Divisional Secretariat is a Divisional Secretariat of Mannar District, of Northern Province, Sri Lanka.

== Demography-Religion ==
Religion in Madhu DS Division (2012)
1. Buddhist (3.50%)
2. Hindu (48.1%)
3. Muslim (7.20%)
4. Roman Catholic (38.9%)
5. Other Christian (2.30%)
6. Other (0.00%)
