= Mannar Divisional Secretariat =

- Divisional Secretariat
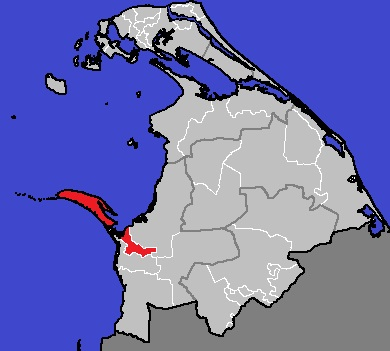
- Country: Sri Lanka
- Province: Northern Province
- District: Mannar District
- Time zone: UTC+5:30 (Sri Lanka Standard Time)

Mannar Divisional Secretariat is a Divisional Secretariat of Mannar District, of Northern Province, Sri Lanka.

== Demography-Religion ==
Religion in Mannar DS Division (2012)
1. Buddhist (1.60%)
2. Hindu (20.4%)
3. Muslim (17.8%)
4. Roman Catholic (54.8%)
5. Other Christian (5.50%)
6. Other (0.00%)
