= Nanaddan Divisional Secretariat =

- Divisional Secretariat
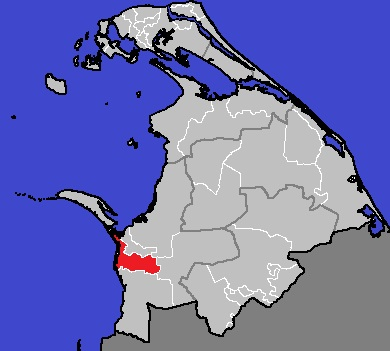
- Country: Sri Lanka
- Province: Northern Province
- District: Mannar District
- Time zone: UTC+5:30 (Sri Lanka Standard Time)

Nanaddan Divisional Secretariat is a Divisional Secretariat of Mannar District, of Northern Province, Sri Lanka.

== Demography-Religion ==
Religion in Nanaddan DS Division (2012)
1. Buddhist (1.40%)
2. Hindu (19.2%)
3. Muslim (3.70%)
4. Roman Catholic (68.4%)
5. Other Christian (7.30%)
6. Other (0.00%)
