= Manthai West Divisional Secretariat =

- Divisional Secretariat
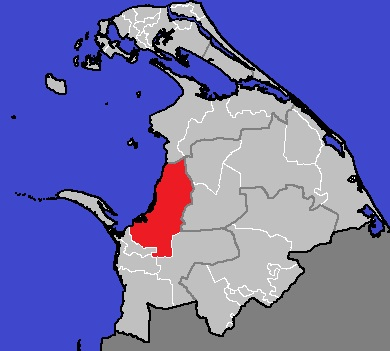
- Country: Sri Lanka
- Province: Northern Province
- District: Mannar District
- Time zone: UTC+5:30 (Sri Lanka Standard Time)

Manthai West Divisional Secretariat is a Divisional Secretariat of Mannar District, of Northern Province, Sri Lanka.

== Demography-Religion ==
Religion in Manthai West DS Division (2012)
1. Buddhist (2.40%)
2. Hindu (41.5%)
3. Muslim (9.10%)
4. Roman Catholic (43.8%)
5. Other Christian (3.30%)
6. Other (0.00%)
