= Tamil People's Council =

Tamil People's Council, formed in Jaffna on 12 December 2015, is a thirty-member council consisting of academics, religious leaders, members from the Civil society and political parties. It has been formed to promote Sri Lankan Tamil people's interests. It is headed by Northern Province Chief Minister C. V. Wigneswaran and co-chaired by Dr. P. Lakshman and Mr. T. Vasantharajah.

== Controversy ==
However, independent Tamil observers and critics have claimed it to be an attempt by Tamil nationalist politicians to oust moderate R.Sampanthan and M. A. Sumanthiran from the leadership of the Tamil National Alliance despite denial by Vigneswaran. Moderate Tamils have expressed fears that the actions of the TPC will result in another era of ethnic violence and the accommodative Sirisena government and its liberal Sinhalese supporters clamming up as extremist slogans failed to bring a meaningful solution to the Tamil question in the past and only resulted in destruction.
