= Flag of Pandya =

The Flag of Pandya (Tamil pronunciation: [pɑːɳɖɪjər koɖɪ]) was used by the Pandyan Dynasty and consisted of a single fish or twin fishes. There exist no surviving reference or description about the physical flag. Therefore, any Pandya flags used in media are created for the purpose of illustration. There are flags with double fish or single fish as per archaeological findings and historians's illustration, with the fish emblem surviving in various Pandyan reliefs.

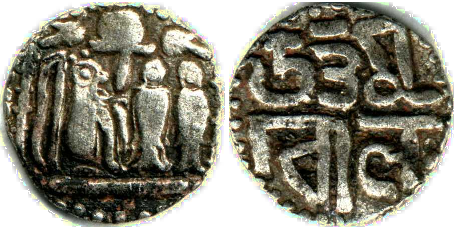
The Pandyan twin fish engraved on a coin of Uttama Chola

The 12th-century Tamil court poet Ottakoothar wrote a verse mentions about the Pandyan flag while comparing to Chola flag.

வெற்றிப் புலிக்கொடிக்கு மீனமோ அம்மானே

— Ottakoothar

Literal Meaning: Can the fish (the symbol of the Pandyas) match the victorious tiger flag (of the Cholas)?

== Legend ==
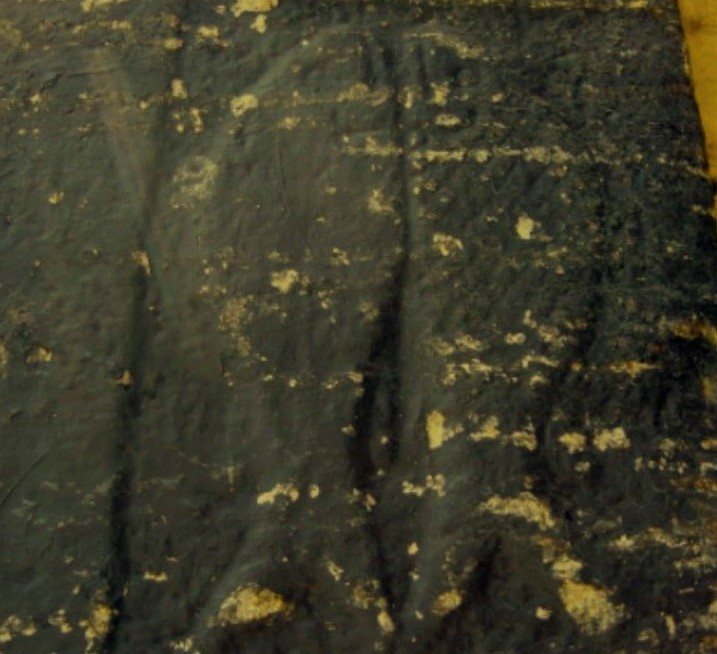
Pandya king Sadayavarman Sundara Pandyan I's double fish carp as a black granite bas-relief in Koneswaram temple – Trincomalee, Sri Lanka

According to legend, an avatar of the Hindu Goddess, Meenakshi, who has fish shaped eyes, was born as the daughter of a Pandya king. The Pandyan emblem was a fish (representing them in coins and engravings). The word Meenatchi is a compound of the Tamil words Meen (fish) and Aatchi (rule), thus meaning "the rule of the fish".

== See also ==
- Flags of Tamils
- Flag of Chola
- Flag of Pallava
