= Kenneth M. Pierce =

Kenneth M. Pierce is an American journalist and contributor to Time.

His reporting has included coverage of:

- American postsecondary education
- the Tamil separatist movement
- Cold War proxy wars
