= Attack on Voice of Tigers =

2007 attack on radio station in Sri Lanka

Sri Lankan Airforce attacked the Voice of Tigers radio station in the then Tamil Tiger rebel controlled Killinochchi on November 27, 2007. The attack killed a journalist Isaivizhi Chempian and two media workers Suresh Limbiyo and T.Tharmalingam and 9 others.Reporters Without Borders called the attack a War Crime.
