= Symbols of Tamil Eelam =

National flag of a proposed state

Tamil Eelam
- Puli Kodi ("Tiger flag")
- Use: National flag and ensign
- Proportion: 5:9
- Adopted: 21 November 1990
- Design: The emblem was designed by an Indian artist from Tamil Nadu. The flag depicting a tiger jumping through a circle of 33 bullets, with crossed black bayonets on a red background.

The flag of Tamil Eelam was designated as the national flag of the proposed state in 1990. The tiger symbol of the Liberation Tigers of Tamil Eelam (LTTE) was created in 1977, differentiating it from the LTTE's emblem by leaving out the letters inscribing the movement's name. In 2005, the LTTE released a guide providing instructions and explaining the correct usage of the Tamil Eelam Flag. The guide written in Tamil specifies the regulations for flying alone or with national flags of other countries, and for general handling of the flag. The flag has four colours: yellow, red, black, and white. It is banned in Sri Lanka and is often seen at protests and functions concerning Tamil Eelam nationalism around the world.

== Symbolic meaning ==
=== Tiger symbol ===
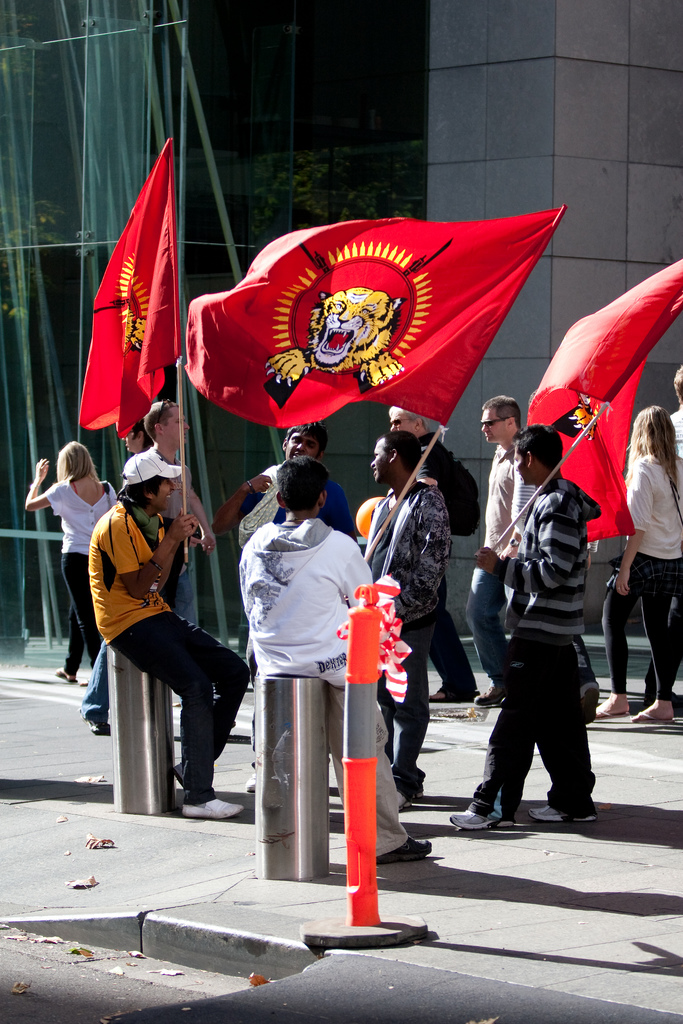
Tamil Eelam supporters in Sydney flying the flag.

The jumping tiger was adopted from the emblem of the Chola Empire, it should reflect the martial history (Veera varalaru) and the national upheaval of the Tamils. The national flag is the symbol of the independent state of Tamil Eelam to be created, rooted in the martial traditions (Veera marapuhal) of the Tamils," LTTE organ Viduthalai Puligal said in its February 1991 issue.

Also, Neil De Votta explains that the 'sword-carrying lion on the Sri Lanka's national flag' is disowned by Tamils, as it represents Prince Vijaya and Sinhalese hegemony over minorities (ibid.: 6). This is also used to explain the use of the tiger by the LTTE to counter the lion during the civil war.

=== Crossed bayonets and circle ===
Vellupillai Prabhakaran himself mentioned in a Tamil interview the circle and crossed bayonets represent the armed resistance and were based on the historical shield with crossed swords flag of Pandara Vanniyan. The circle sometimes considered to be a "Uthaya Suriyan" (rising sun) which is a symbol of Sri Lankan Tamils and earlier political movements. The LTTE leader was often compared to Pandara Vanniyan of Vannimai, because both had a similar fate. Pandara Vanniyan was a freedom fighter during the British colonial era in Sri Lanka.

=== 33 bullets ===
The bullets symbolise the historical 33 years between 1948 - 1981 (oppression the Tamil population by the Sri Lankan government before the outbreak of Sri Lankan Civil War).

- 11 bullets on the left
- 11 bullets on the right
- 11 bullets at the top
- total: 33 bullets

=== Colours ===
Flag of the Tamil Democrats with the traditional colors of Tamil Eelam

Four aspects of ideals and mission of Tamil Eelam represented by the four colours are detailed in the published guide book.

The yellow signifies that Tamils' aspiration to freely govern themselves in their own homeland is a fundamental political and human right. The colour expresses the righteousness of Tamil struggle and reinforces Tamil Nation's will to uphold moral highground during its path towards freedom.

The red represents the realisation that freedom is not complete by establishment of a separate state of Tamil Eelam. Distinctions of caste and class should be abolished. Egalitarianism should become their spiritual principle. Gender equality should permeate Tamil society. The revolutionary changes necessary to spread social justice represented by these principles are reflected by this colour.

The black reminds that march towards freedom is wrought with dangers, death and destruction, that is filled with pain and misery. It signifies determination and resoluteness vital to withstand the adversities and build the new nation of Tamil Eelam, to provide security and to defend the borders.

The white demands purity, honesty and selflessness from the leaders and citizens of Tamil Eelam.

== National anthem ==
Anthem: Eruthu Paar Kodi

Eruthu Paar Kodi (Look, the Flag is Rising) is a Tamil song, written by Puthuvai Rathinathurai, sung at the hoisting of the Flag of Tamil Eelam. As the most widely used song of the Tamils, it was used in the place of a national anthem by the Liberation Tigers of Tamil Eelam. The song was written during the Sri Lankan Civil War.

=== Lyrics ===
The song praises the flag and describes the pride of Tamil Eelam army.

ஏறுதுபார் கொடி (Tamil)

ஏறுதுபார் கொடி ஏறுது பார்
ஏறுதுபார் கொடி ஏறுது பார் – இங்கு
ஏறுதுபார் கொடி ஏறுது பார் – தமிழ்
ஈழத்தின் வேதனை தீர்த்தகொடி – எட்டுத்
திக்கிலும் மானத்தைச் சேர்த்தகொடி
காலத்தை வென்றுமே நின்றகொடி – புலி
காட்டிய பாதையில் சென்ற கொடி (ஏறுதுபார்)

செக்க நிறத்திலே வேங்கை நடுவிலே
சீறிடும் கொடியிது – தமிழ்
மக்களைக் காத்த நம்மான மாவீரரை
வாழ்த்திடும் கொடியிது – புலி
வீரத்தின் கொடியிது
மாவீரனின் கொடியிது (ஏறுதுபார்)

எத்தனை எத்தனை வேங்கைகள் ரத்தத்தில்
ஏறிய கொடியிது – பெரும்
சத்திய வேள்வியில் செத்தவர் மீதினில்
சாற்றிய கொடியிது – தமிழ்
ஈழத்தின் கொடியிது – புலி
ஏந்திய கொடியிது (ஏறுதுபார்)

சாதிகள் சண்டைகள் சாய்த்து விழுத்திய
சாதனைக் கொடியிது – சங்கு
ஊதி முழங்கிட ஊர்மனை யாவிலும்
உலவிய கொடியிது – சம
தர்மத்தின் கொடியிது – எங்கள்
தாயவள் கொடியிது (ஏறுதுபார்)

ஆயிரமாயிரம் பேரென வேங்கைகள்
ஆக்கிய கொடியிது – பிர
பாகரன் என்றிடும் காவிய நாயகன்
போற்றிடும் கொடியிது – தமிழ்த்
தேசத்தின் கொடியிது – எங்கள்
தேசியக் கொடியிது (ஏறுதுபார்)

ēṟutupār koṭi ISO 15919

ēṟutupār koṭi ēṟutu pār
ēṟutupār koṭi ēṟutu pār – iṅku
ēṟutupār koṭi ēṟutu pār – tamiḻ
īḻattiṉ vētaṉai tīrttakoṭi – eṭṭut
tikkilum māṉattaic cērttakoṭi
kālattai veṉṟumē niṉṟakoṭi – puli
kāṭṭiyapātaiyil ceṉṟa koṭi (ēṟutupār)

cekka niṟattilē vēṅkai naṭuvilē
cīṟiṭum koṭiyitu – tamiḻ
makkaḷaik kātta nammāṉamā vīrarai
vāḻttiṭum koṭiyitu – puli
vīrattiṉ koṭiyitu –
māvīraṉiṉ koṭiyitu (ēṟutupār)

ettaṉai ettaṉai vēṅkaikaḷ rattattil
ēṟiya koṭiyitu – perum
cattiya vēḷviyil ceththavar mītiṉil
cāṟṟiya koṭiyitu – tamiḻ
īḻattiṉ koṭiyitu – puli
ēntiya koṭiyitu (ēṟutupār)

cātikaḷ caṇṭaikaḷ cāyttu viḻuttiya
cātaṉaik koṭiyitu – caṅku
ūti muḻaṅkiṭa ūrmaṉai yāvilum
ulaviya koṭiyitu – cama
tarmattiṉ koṭiyitu – eṅkaḷ
tāyavaḷ koṭiyitu (ēṟutupār)

āyiramāyiram pēreṉa vēṅkaikaḷ
ākkiya koṭiyitu – pira
pākaraṉ eṉṟiṭum kāviya nāyakaṉ
pōṟṟiṭum koṭiyitu – tamiḻt
tēcattiṉ koṭiyitu – eṅkaḷ
tēciyak koṭiyitu (ēṟutupār)

== Symbols of Tamil Eelam ==
Symbols selected by the Tamil Tigers for Tamil Eelam

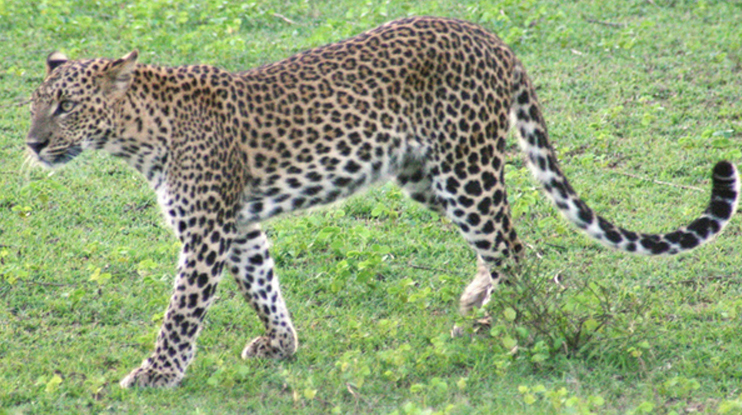
National animal (Sri Lankan leopard)

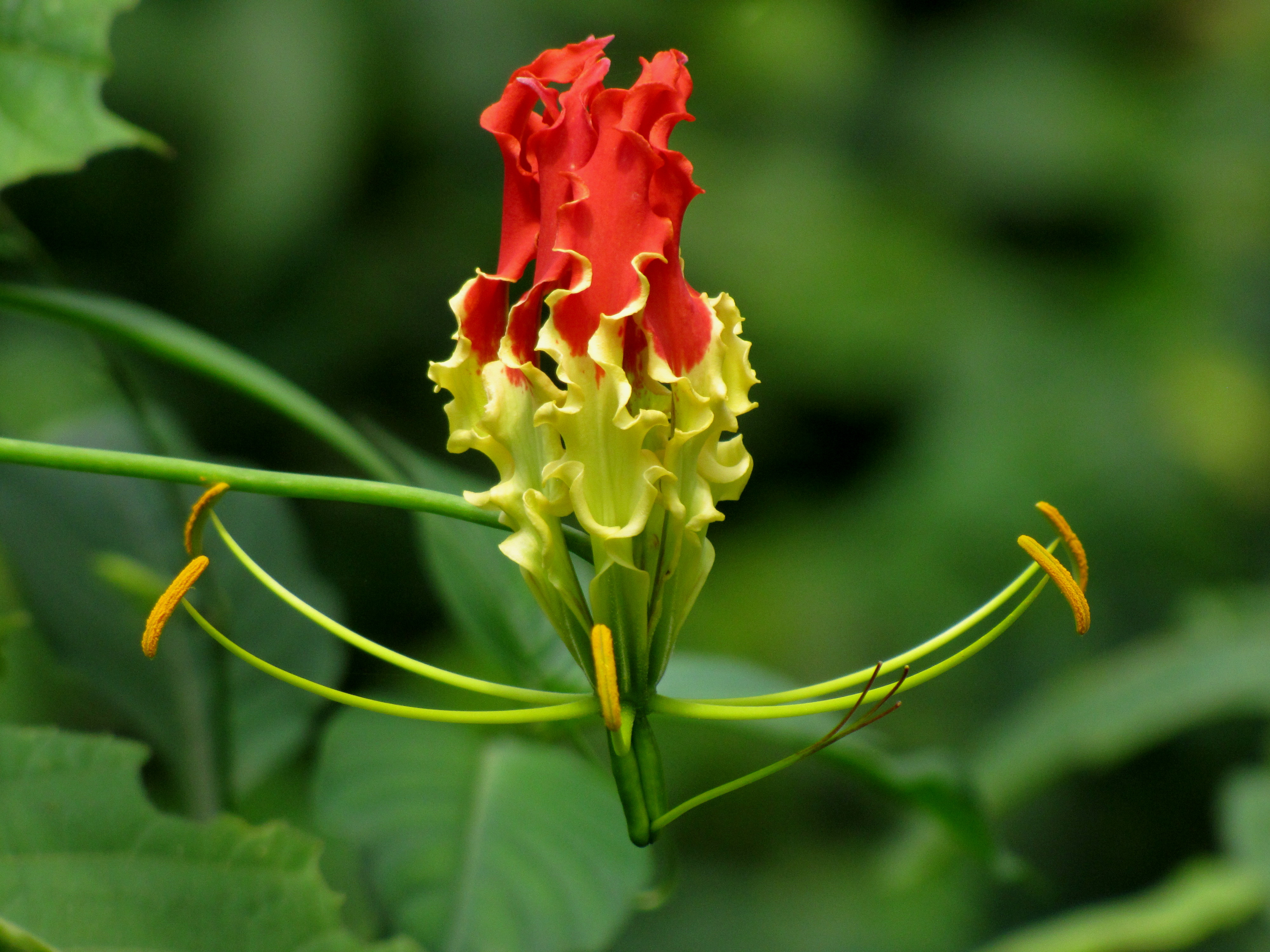
National flower (Gloriosa superba)

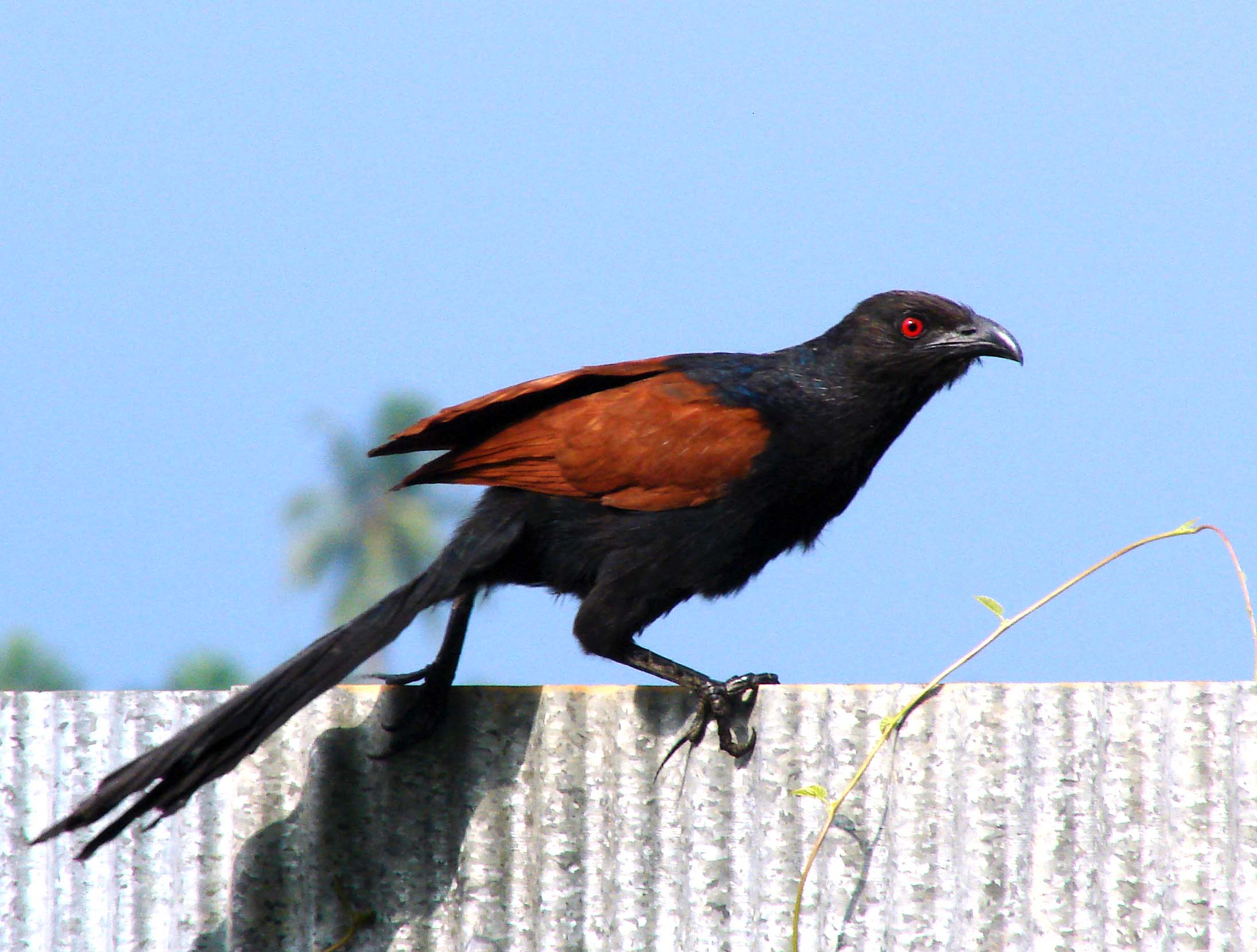
National bird (Greater coucal)

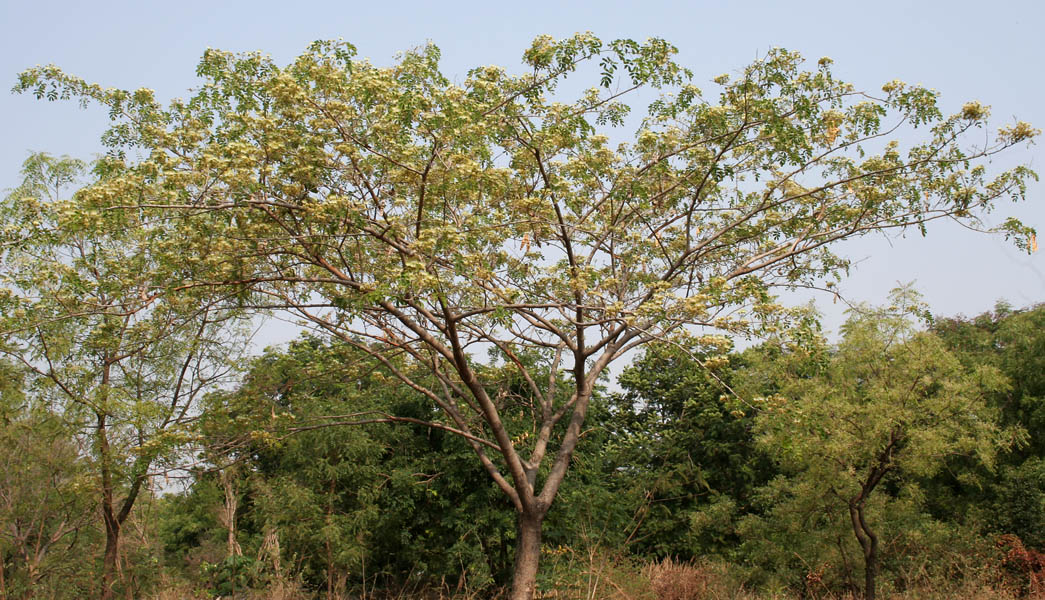
National tree (Albizia lebbeck)

== See also ==
- Flags of Tamils
- List of Tamil Nadu state symbols, for symbols of the state in India
