= Proposed flag of Tamil Nadu =

Proposed flag of Indian state of Tamil Nadu

Proposed flag of Tamil Nadu (1970)
- Proportion: 2:3
- Adopted: Not adopted
- Design: The Indian flag on the top left and the Emblem of Tamil Nadu in blue colour on the centre-right.
- Designed by: Government of Tamil Nadu (individual designer unknown)

At present there is no official flag for the state of Tamil Nadu in India. A flag was proposed for the state in 1970, but was not formally adopted at the time.

The Government of Tamil Nadu proposed a design for a state flag in 1970. The proposed design was grey with the flag of India in the canton and the emblem of Tamil Nadu in the fly. It was proposed by newly elected Chief Minister M. Karunanidhi of the Dravida Munnetra Kazhagam party. At the time, the proposal was opposed by the Chief Ministers of several other states and it was not officially adopted.

== See also ==
- List of Tamil Nadu state symbols
- Emblem of Tamil Nadu
- Tamil Thai Valthu
- Tamil flags
- National flag of India
- List of Indian state flags
