= Flag of Pallava =

The Flag of Pallava was used by the Tamil Pallava Kingdom. The Pallava royal insignia was the Simha (Lion) and Nandi (Bull) which was changeable, but the colour of the flag is saffron or yellow. Each Pallava king had his own personal banner. For example, Narasimhavarman II used the lion as his emblem and Nandivarman II preferred the Nandi. Under the reign of Paramesvaravarman I the Khatvanga (skull mace) was added to the Pallava emblem. There were probably different Pallava lines. The main line ruled in Kanchipuram and comes from the Simha line (Simhavarman I, Simhavishnu, Narasimhavarman I...). The Simha emblem was inherited from descendants of the Simha line.

== See also ==
- Flag of Pandya
- Flag of Chola
- Flags of Tamils
