= Flag of Chola =

Prabagaran Sokumaran

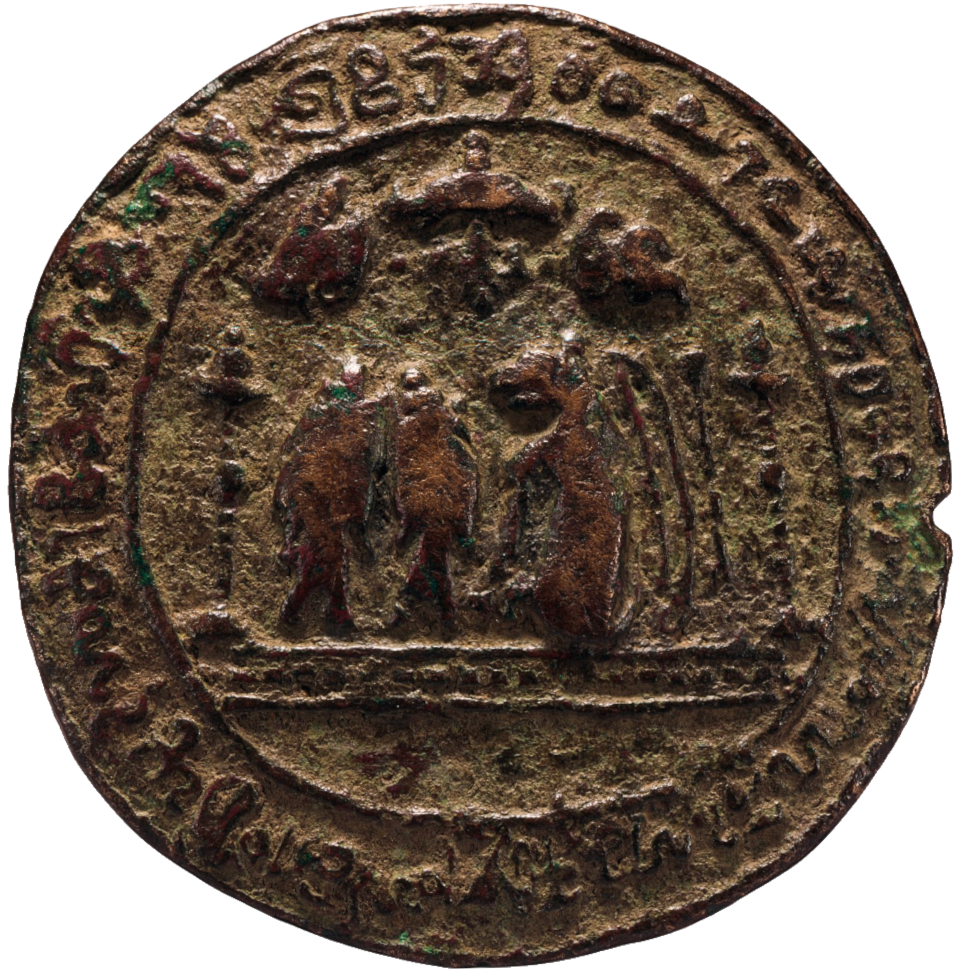
Seal of Rajendra I, depicting a tiger sitting between two fish and a bow.

The Flag of Chola or Tiger Flag (Tamil: புலி கொடி) was used by the Tamil Chola dynasty. The Tiger or Jumping Tiger was the royal emblem of the Cholas and was depicted on coins, seals and banners. On the coins of Uttama Chola, the Chola Tiger was shown sitting between the twin fish of Pandya and the bow of Chera. The flag of Chola is mentioned in Periya Puranam, which was compiled during the 12th century by Sekkizhar.

The Periya Puranam has following mention about Chola flag:

பாட்டியற் றமிழுரை பயின்ற வெல்லையுட்

கோட்டுயர் பனிவரைக் குன்றி னுச்சியிற்
சூட்டிய வளர்புலிச் சோழர் காவிரி
நாட்டியல் பதனையா னவில லுற்றனன்.

- பெரியபுராணம்

== Contemporary derivatives ==
The Flag of Tamil Eelam was inspired by the Chola flag.

== See also ==
- Flag of Pandya
- Flag of Pallava
- Flags of Tamils
