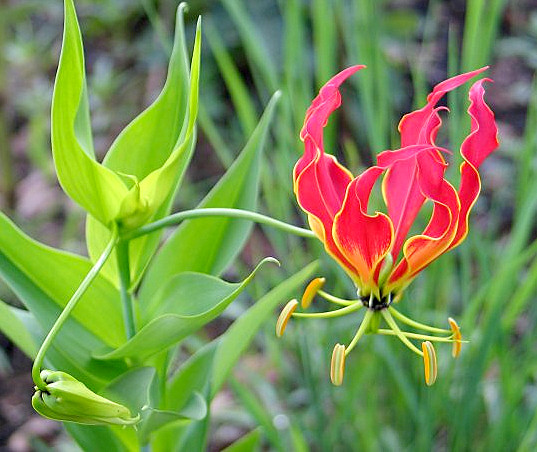

Conservation status
- Least Concern (IUCN 3.1)

Scientific classification
- Kingdom: Plantae
- Clade: Tracheophytes
- Clade: Angiosperms
- Clade: Monocots
- Order: Liliales
- Family: Colchicaceae
- Genus: Gloriosa
- Species: G. superba

Binomial name
- Gloriosa superba Linnaeus (1753)

Synonyms
- List: Methonica superba Crantz (1766); Eugone superba Salisbury (1796); Gloriosa cirrhifolia Stokes (1812); Methonica gloriosa Salisbury (1812); Gloriosa angulata Schumacher (1827); Gloriosa doniana Schultes & Schultes (1829); Gloriosa nepalensis Don (1830); Methonica senegalensis Poiteau (1830); Methonica doniana Kunth (1843); Gloriosa superba var. angustifolia Baker (1879); Gloriosa superba f. doniana Durand & Schinz (1894); Gloriosa superba f. angustifolia Kuntze (1898); Gloriosa lutea Masters (1901); Gloriosa rothschildiana O'Brien (1903); Gloriosa verschuurii Hoog (1950); Gloriosa rockefelleriana Stehlé & Stehlé (1965)

= Gloriosa superba =

Species of plant

Gloriosa superba (Note: Also known as christmas flower, climbing lily, creeping lily, flame lily, glory lily, and tiger claw.) is a species of flowering plant in the family Colchicaceae. It is native to and common across most of Africa except North Africa, South Asia, Southeast Asia, and south-central China. It has been introduced to parts of Americas, Australia, and the Pacific Islands.

The plant produces several solitary bright red and yellow coloured flowers on long stalks. Though most parts of the plant are highly poisonous, it is used extensively in traditional medicine.

== Description ==
Gloriosa superba is a herbaceous perennial plant that grows from a fleshy, horizontal, and white rhizome. It has a thin stem measuring up to 3 to 4 m (9.8 to 13.1 ft) in length in climbing plants, while being shorter in erect plants. Unlike other plants from the lily family, the plant produces green colored leaf-tip tendrils which are 2 to 3 in (51 to 76 mm) long, which is used for holding on to surfaces. The leaves are either arranged alternately or oppositely. The leaves are lance-shaped or elongated oval shaped with coiled lip tips with tendrils. The leaves are attached to the stem by a short petiole. The leaves are 10.2 to 12.7 cm (4.0 to 5.0 in) long, and 1.3 to 2.5 cm (0.51 to 0.98 in) wide, with smooth margins, and has several prominent veins running along the surface.

The plant produces large solitary flowers measuring 7.6 to 12 cm (3.0 to 4.7 in) in length and 4.5 to 7 cm (1.8 to 2.8 in) in diameter. Each flower may weigh over 2.5 g (0.09 oz). They are borne on slender and long pedicels measuring up to 20 cm (7.9 in) in length. The flowers are actinomorphic and bisexual. The perianth consists of six 5 to 8.3 cm (2.0 to 3.3 in) long tepals, which are elongated and spoon shaped with wavy margins. The tepals are largely free and attached only at the base. When the small, green colored buds blossom, the tepals elongate and bend backwards while changing color. A mature flower shows a brilliant yellow to red colorization. Other variations with off white, yellow, orange, maroon, and purple-brown flowers have been reported.

Each flower contains six prominent stamens slanting outwards towards the tepals. The stamen consists of a 1 cm (0.39 in) long anther borne on the tip of a 3 to 4 cm (1.2 to 1.6 in) long filament, and the pollens are released from vertical slits on the exterior of the anther. The gynoecium consists of three carpels attached along the inner edge of the flower to form the pistil which holds a superior ovary on the top. Each pistil consists of a 2.5 to 3.5 cm (0.98 to 1.38 in) long style and 6 to 7 mm (0.24 to 0.28 in) long stigma. The fruit is a fleshy capsule up to 6 cm (2.4 in) long consisting of several red seeds.

== Distribution and ecology ==
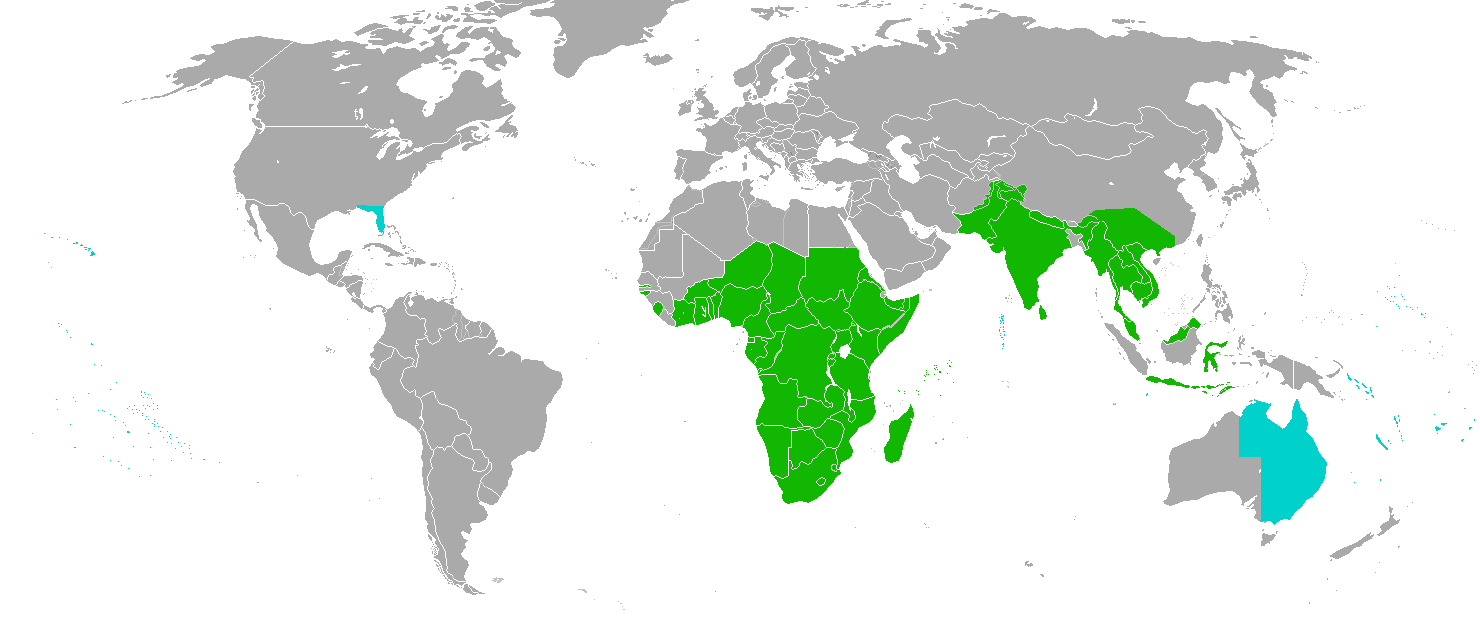
Natural distribution (green) Area of introduction (pale blue)

The plant is native to Africa, tropical regions of South Asia and Southeast Asia, and south-central China. In Africa, except North Africa, it is found in most of the mainland, from Senegal in the east to Ethiopia in the west, and all the way down to South Africa. It has been introduced to Alabama and Hawaii in the United States, parts of the Caribbean, Suriname in South America, the Australian territories of New South Wales, Queensland, and Northern Territory, and various Pacific Islands.

Though it is distributed widely across South Asia and Africa, the species has been rarer in Southern Africa, Bangladesh, Sri Lanka, and certain territories of India. The decline is attributed to the harvesting of wild plants for its parts for usage in traditional medicine. On the other hand, outside its native range, it has been classified as an invasive species in Australia and the Pacific Islands such as Cook Islands, French Polynesia, Kiribati, and Singapore.

The plant is found across a variety of habitats including dense tropical forests, savannah, grasslands, dunes, edges of agricultural fields, barren lands, and on roadsides. It is generally found in the wild at altitudes ranging from 900 to 1,300 m (3,000 to 4,300 ft), though it has been found at altitudes up to 2,500 m (8,200 ft). In natural habitats, the plant is likely pollinated by butterflies and sunbirds.

== Cultivation ==
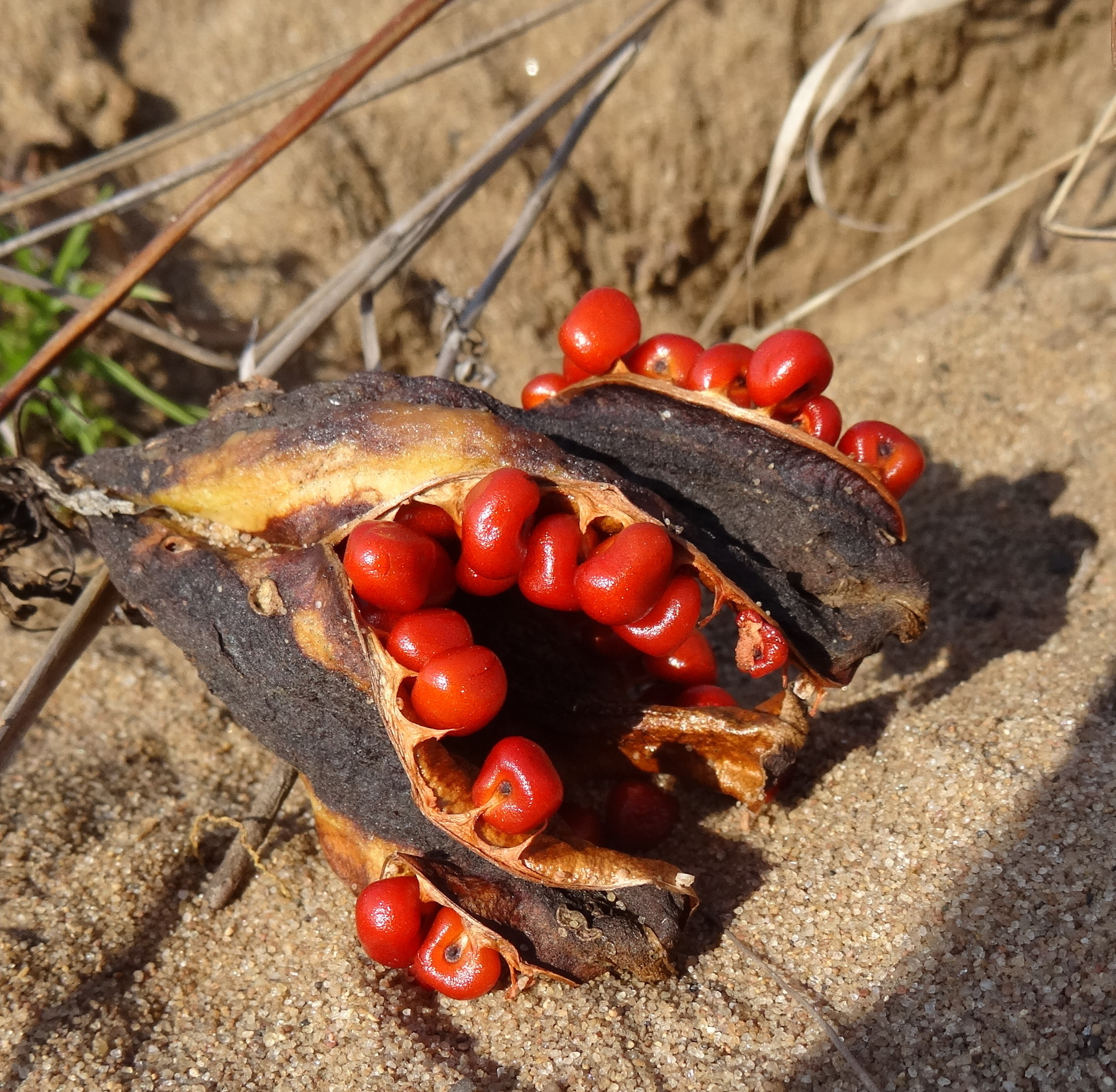
Fruit (left) and seeds in a dry pod

The plant is widely cultivated in South Asia, and in parts of Southeast Asia and Africa. The domestic cultivars may vary in characteristics from the wild plants. There are dwarf varieties and plants producing flowers with broader and smoother tepals. Several color variations are cultivated including plants producing all white, orange, plum, or yellow flowers. The plant can be propagated by seed or vegetatively by dividing the rhizome. The sprouting of the seeds can take anywhere between a few weeks to three months. The seeds can sprout even after remaining dormant for up to nine months. The tubers are divided every two years, and two-thirds of the tubers generally sprout within a month. However, an existing tuber can be used to propagate a maximum of two plants in a year. As plants grown from seeds can take long to germinate, and three years to mature, various methodologies, such as soaking the seeds in water, maintaining a warm and stable temperature while germinating, augmenting with chemicals such as hypochlorite, and addition of growth hormones such as auxins, are used to speed up the germination and growth of the plant.

The plant grows well on moist and well drained soils with good sun light. Mature plants flower for about seven weeks during the rainy season, and the flower buds take about two weeks to bloom. The plant dies after a flowering season, and new shoots arise from the tuber again. Problems during cultivation include inadequate pollination, fungal diseases such as leaf blight and tuber rot, crop pests such as the moths Polytela gloriosa and Chrysodeixis chalcites, lice, and thrips. A 2012 study reported that in vitro experiments with plant tissue culture increased the yield in few of the trials. The fruits are hand-picked and the tubers are dug out during harvest. The fruits are dried and split, and the seeds are removed and dried further. The seeds and rhizomes are sold as whole or in powdered or oil forms.

== Chemical composition and toxicity ==
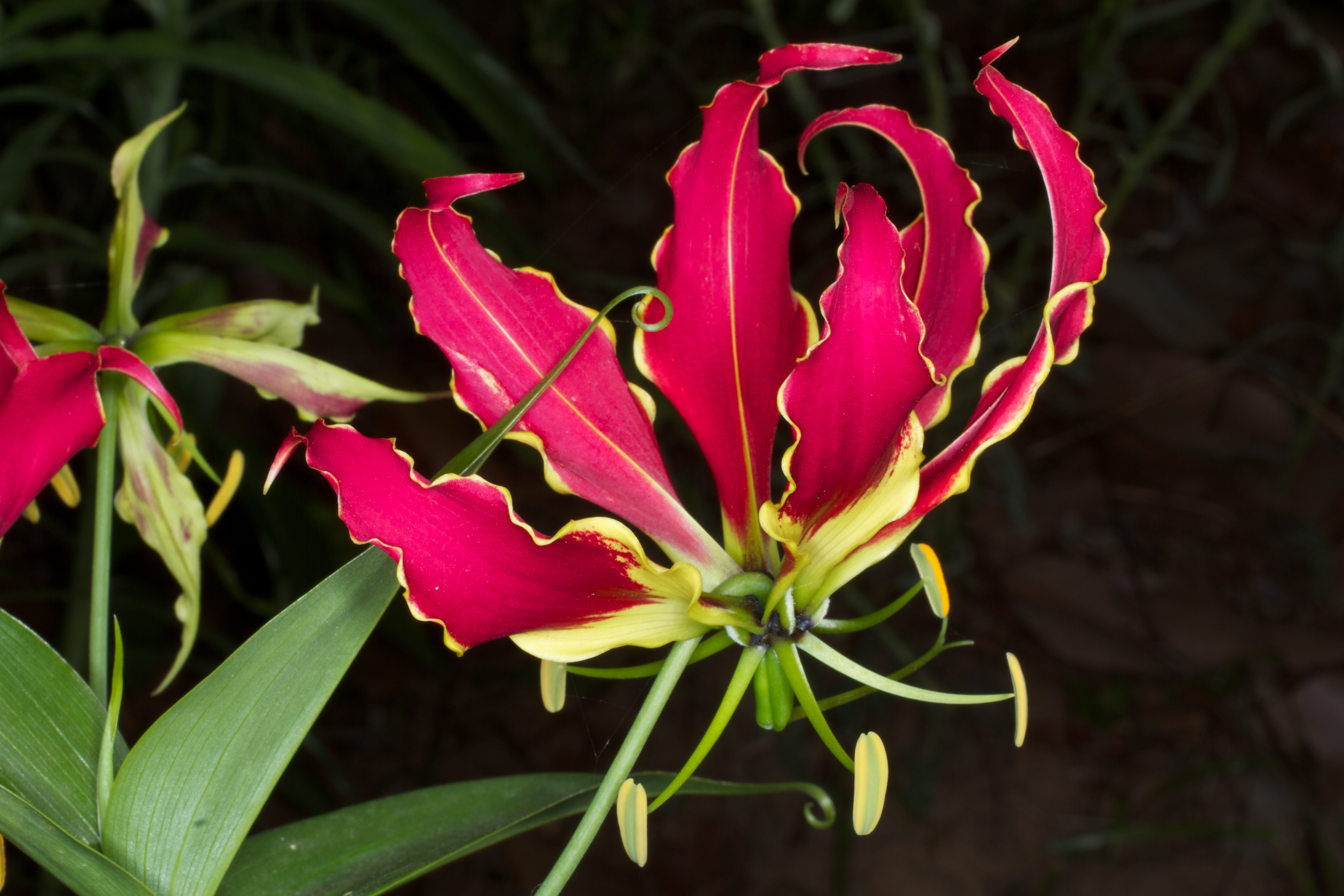
Most parts of the plant, including the flowers, are poisonous to humans

The plant contains high levels of colchicine, an alkaloid, derived from the amino acids phenylalanine and tyrosine as precursors. Apart from colchicine and colchicoside, it contains several other alkaloids including gloriosine, and other chemicals such as chelidonic acid, and salicylic acid. The young leaves and seeds contain a higher concentration of colchicine, with the seeds containing a colchicine content that is two to five times higher than in the tuber. β-Sitosterol, a fatty acid, and glucosides are found in the flowers.

Due to the presence of colchicine, most parts of the plant are toxic, especially the seeds and the tubers. The plant parts or derived compounds are poisonous and ingestion can be fatal to humans, fish, cattle, and other domesticated animals. Poisonings also occur as the tubers are mistaken for sweet potato or yam and consumed. About 60 mg (0.93 gr) of colchicine is considered lethal to humans, while deaths have occurred at lower doses, and people have survived after ingesting doses of up to 350 mg (5.4 gr). Research has indicated that the median lethal dose was 5 mg per kg in rats.

Colchicine is absorbed in the gastrointestinal tract. It affects the cell membrane and disrupts cell division. The symptoms of poisoning can show up two to six hours after ingestion. Symptoms include nausea, vomiting, burning in the throat, abdominal pain, convulsions, and diarrhea. It leads to a drop in blood pressure, difficulty in breathing, and loss of consciousness, which may progress to haematuria, oliguria, leucocytosis, leucopenia, thrombocytopenia, and haemorrhage. Polyneuropathy and muscle weakness occur later, followed by death by respiratory distress or cardiovascular failure in a few days if left untreated. It is also known to cause late alopecia. There is no known antidote to Gloriosa poisoning. While it is toxic to humans and most animals, the poison had shown no effect on some mammals such as African porcupine and certain species of moles.

== Uses ==
The tubers are used extensively in traditional medicine

It is grown as an ornamental plant for its varied colored flowers. As it contains colchicine, it is widely used in pharmaceuticals. Colchicine is used in the treatment of gout, and other inflammatory disorders. Colchicine has also used in experimental research to slow cell division, finding application in oncology. The plant derivatives are used in arrow poison in Africa, and snake repellent in India.

The plant is extensively used in traditional medicine such as ayurveda. It has been used to as a laxative, and to treat ulcers, arthritis, haemorrhoids, cholera, infertility, intestinal worms, colic, renal ailments, snake bite, typhus, leprosy, and other dermatological conditions. In Africa, the parts of the plant are used to treat various ailments. The leaves are used for treating asthma in Democractic Republic of Congo, and rheumatism in Burundi. The extract from the leaves are used to treat cough, and pain in Ivory Coast and Burkina Faso, and as a disinfectant and anti-malaria drug in Tanzania. The tuber extract is used as a sleep inducer in Sudan, and to treat abdominal disorders in Kenya and Congo. It is also ued to treat ear ache in Tanzania and tooth ache in Zimbabwe. Apart from traditional uses, the plant and its derivatives has been used to commit murder, suicide, to induce abortions and to poison animals such as dogs.

== Culture and symbolism ==
Gloriosa superba on an Indonesian stamp (1966)

Gloriosa superba is the national flower of Zimbabwe. In 1947, Elizabeth II received a diamond brooch in the shape of the flower for her twenty-first birthday while traveling to Rhodesia.

The flower is known by various names in Tamil including Chenkaanthal and Karthigai Poo (flower blooming in the Tamil calendar month of Karthigai) in Tamil. It is the state flower of the Indian state of Tamil Nadu. As per the Government of Tamil Nadu, it was designated so because of its association with Tamil culture and its medicinal usage.

The flower was designated as the national flower of the de facto state of Tamil Eelam by the Liberation Tigers of Tamil Eelam in 2003, as it contained the colours of the Tamil Eelam flag and because it bloomed during November, coinciding with Maaveerar Naal.
