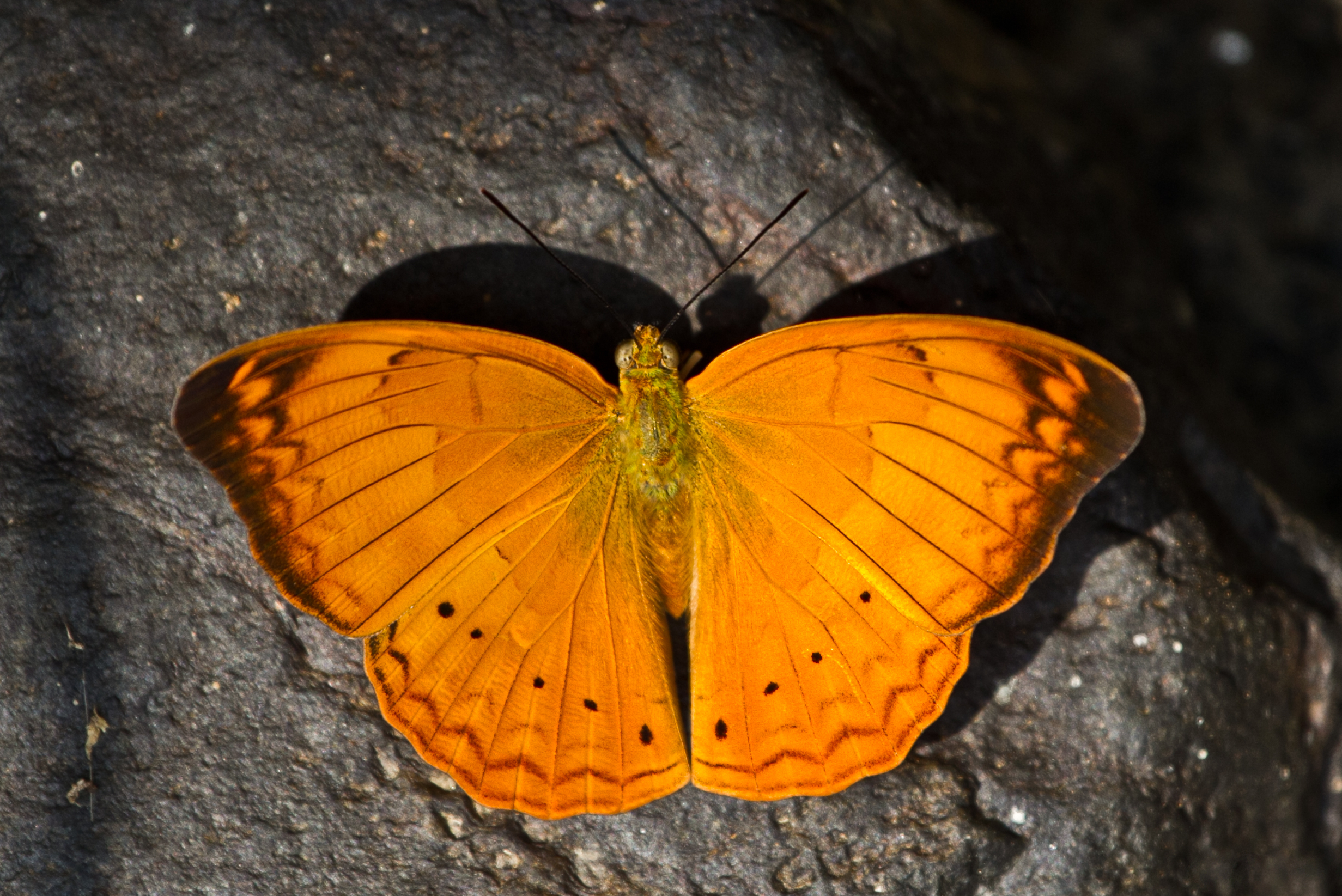
- Upperside
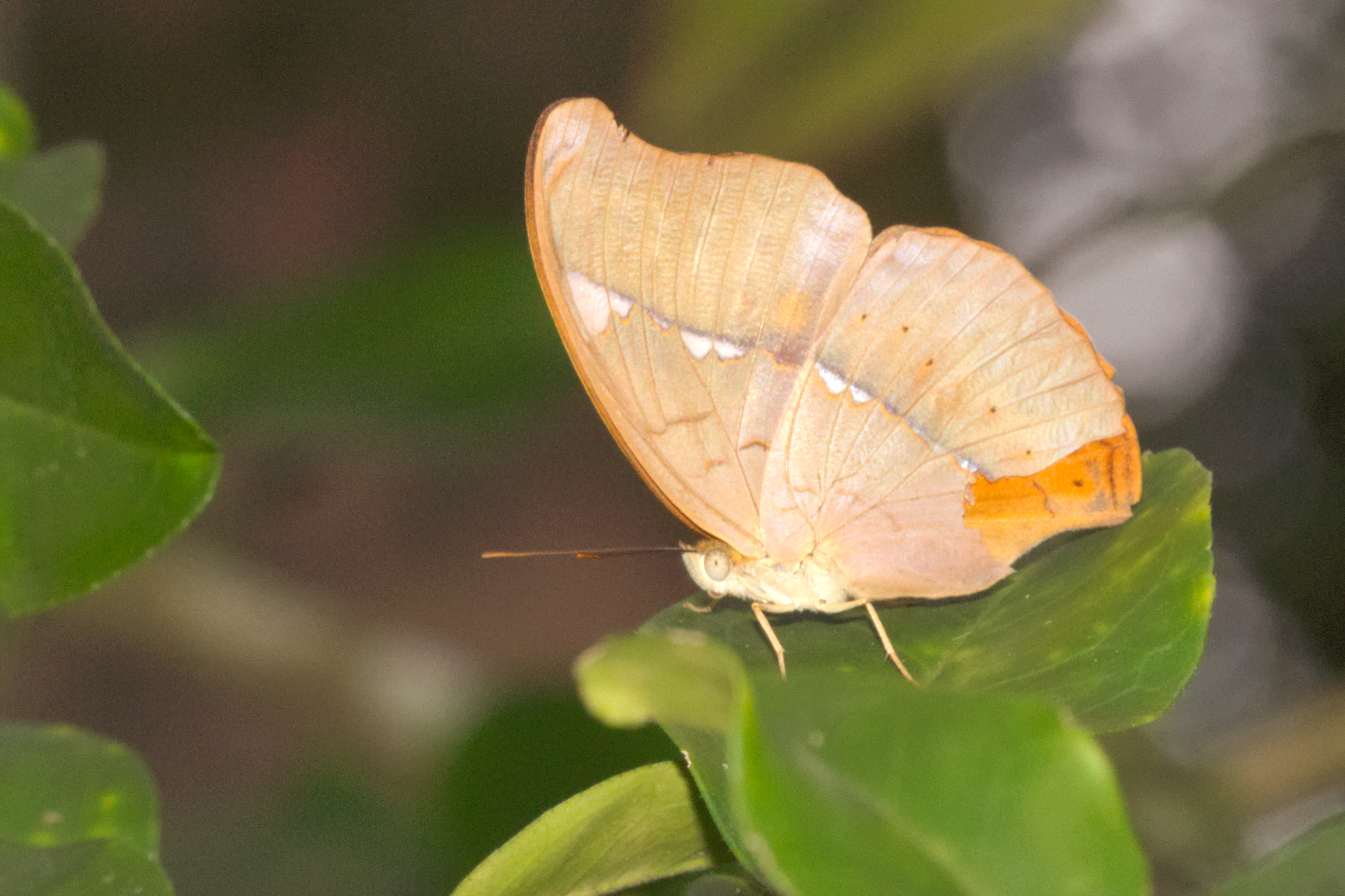
- Underside

Scientific classification
- Kingdom: Animalia
- Phylum: Arthropoda
- Clade: Pancrustacea
- Class: Insecta
- Order: Lepidoptera
- Family: Nymphalidae
- Genus: Cirrochroa
- Species: C. thais

Binomial name
- Cirrochroa thais (Fabricius, 1787)

Synonyms
- Papilio thais Fabricius (1787); Argynnis thea Godart (1819); Cirrochroa swinhoei Butler (1881); Cirrhochroa relata Nicéville (1886)

= Cirrochroa thais =

Tamil yeoman

Species of butterfly

Cirrochroa thais, also known as the Tamil yeoman, is a butterfly species of the nymphalidae family found in South India and Sri Lanka. It was first described under the scientific name Papilio thais by Danish zoologist Johann Christian Fabricius in 1787.

The butterfly has bright reddish yellow coloured wings measuring up to 60 to 75 mm (2.4 to 3.0 in). The wings are paler on the underside and feature a white spot in the middle. The wing tips are black and there are several small black spots on the wings. The The females have similar markings but are slightly paler in colour than the males.

In 2019, it was declared as the state butterfly of the Indian state of Tamil Nadu.

== Taxonomy ==
The butterfly was first described under the name Papilio thais by Danish zoologist Johann Christian Fabricius in the Mantissa Insectorum in 1787. Jean-Baptiste Godart described it as Argynnis thea in the Encyclopédie Méthodique in 1819. It was moved to the genus Cirrochroa after Edward Doubleday established the new genus Cirrochroa in the The Genera of Diurnal Lepidoptera in 1847. Other synonyms include Cirrochroa swinhoei by Arthur Gardiner Butler (1881) and Cirrhochroa relataby Lionel de Nicéville (1886). Two subspecies are recognised–Cirrochroa thais thais from South India and Cirrochroa thais lanka from Sri Lanka.

== Description ==
The butterfly has a wingspan of 60–75 mm (2.4–3.0 in). In the wet season, the male butterfly exhibits a bright yellowish-brown colourisation on the upper side which become darker towards the base. There is a thin, dark streak and wavy black lines across the forewing. The wingtips are black with two irregular lines running close to it. The outer line blends with the wingtips while the inner line becomes wides towards the outer edge. The hindwing also consists of two wavy lines along the edges. It has a white patch at the top edge and a row of small black spots towards the bottom edge. The wings are demarcated by a continuous black line along the margin. The underside is paler with reddish-yellow to brown mixed with pale violet-grey. A broad white or violet-grey line runs across the wings while there is a thin brown line runs near the base of the wings. The inner edge is irregular with a dark border while the outer edge is smooth. There are faint indentations on the forewing while there are several small dark spots on the hindwing.

The female has similar colourisation but is paler than the male on the upper side but darker towards the lower edge. It has more curved forewing edges. The central demarcation line is bordered by a dark purple-grey line on both sides. The row of black spots is smaller than those found in the male. In the dry season, both the sexes exhibit a paler colour. The markings are less distinct and faint. The band in the middle is continuous and unbroken, and the inner edges are fairly smooth.

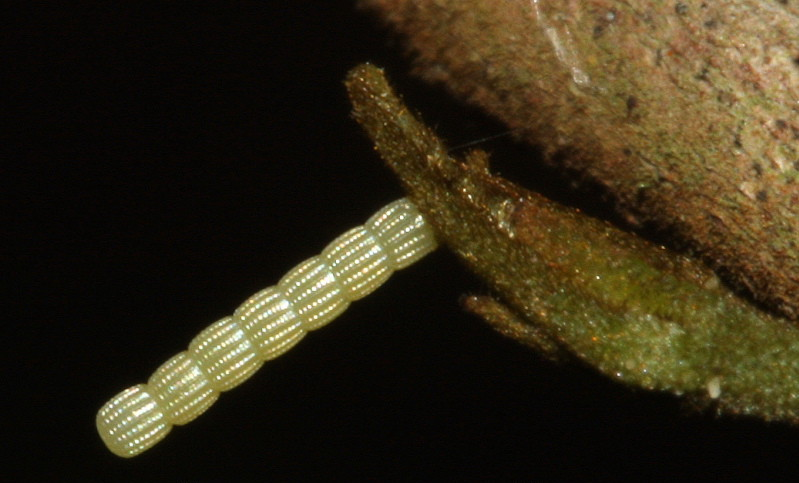
Eggs

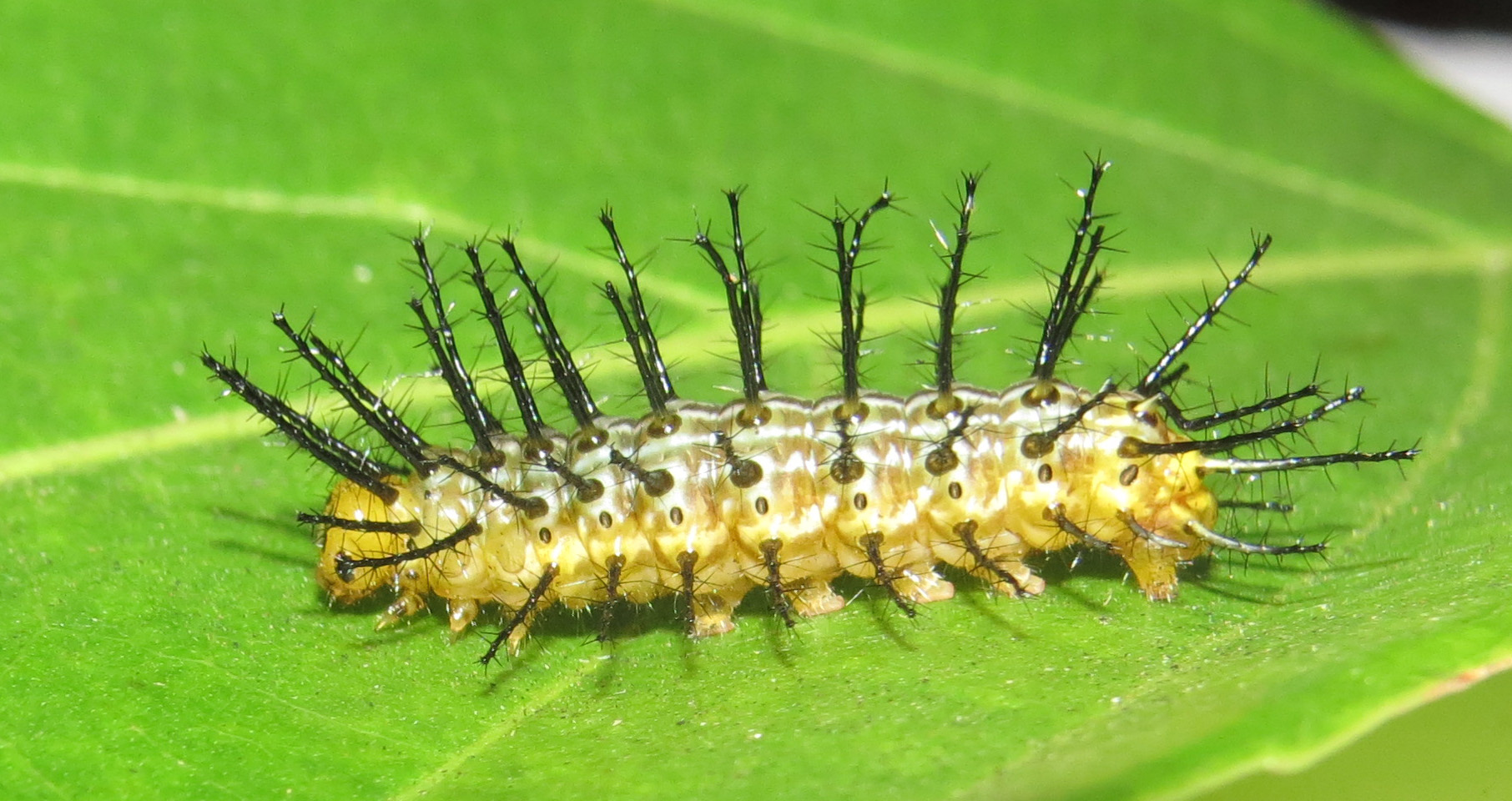
Caterpillar

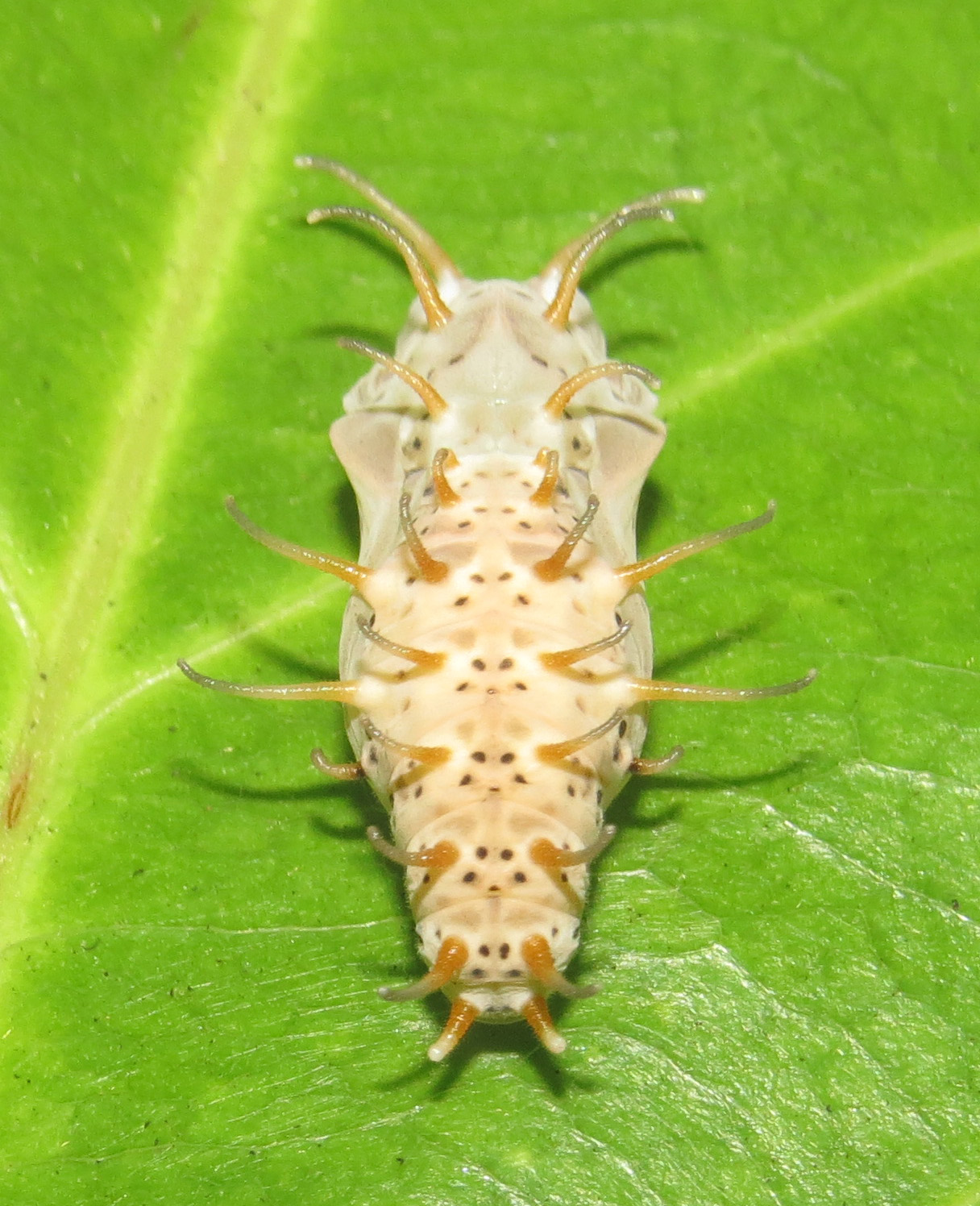
Pupa

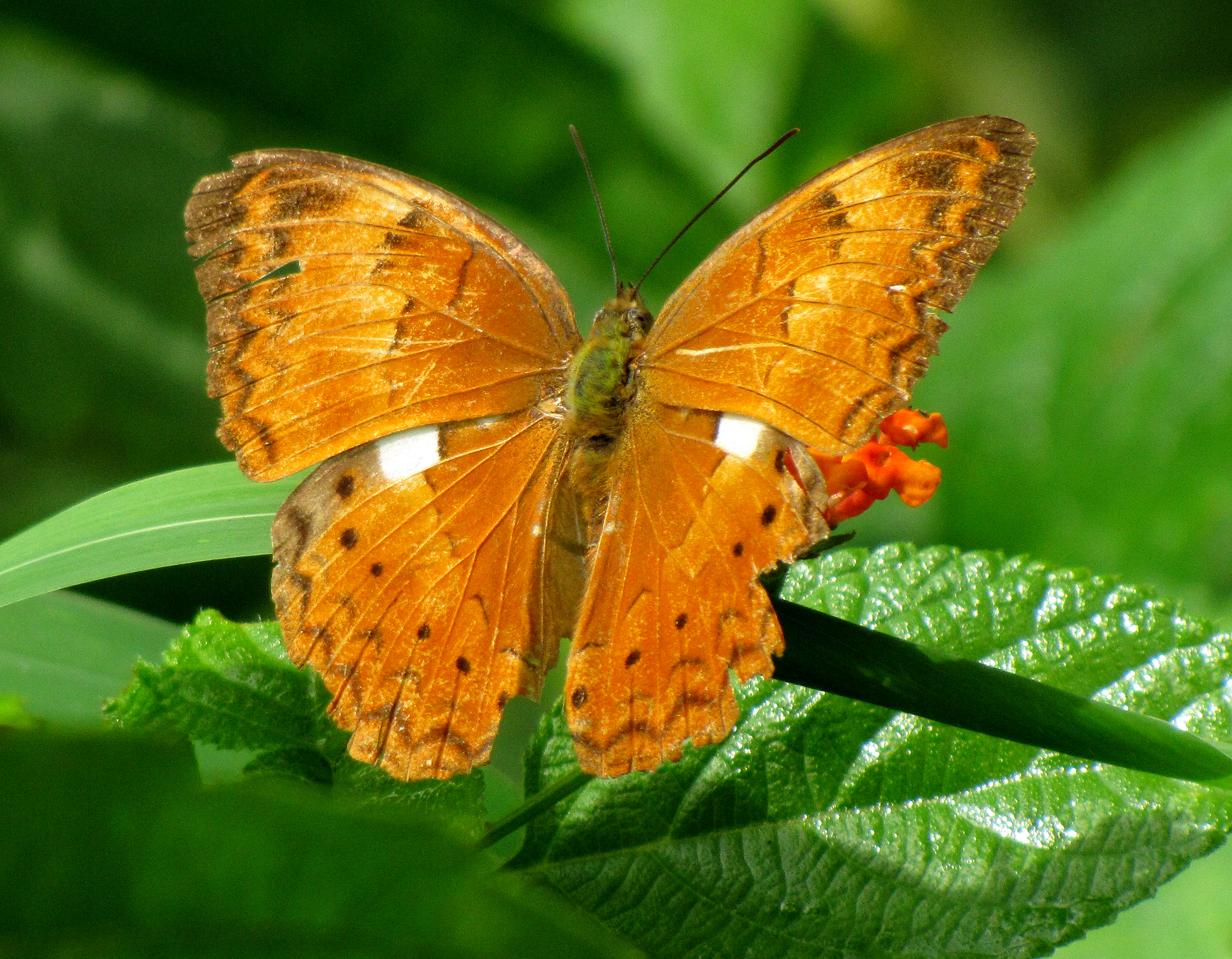
Adult

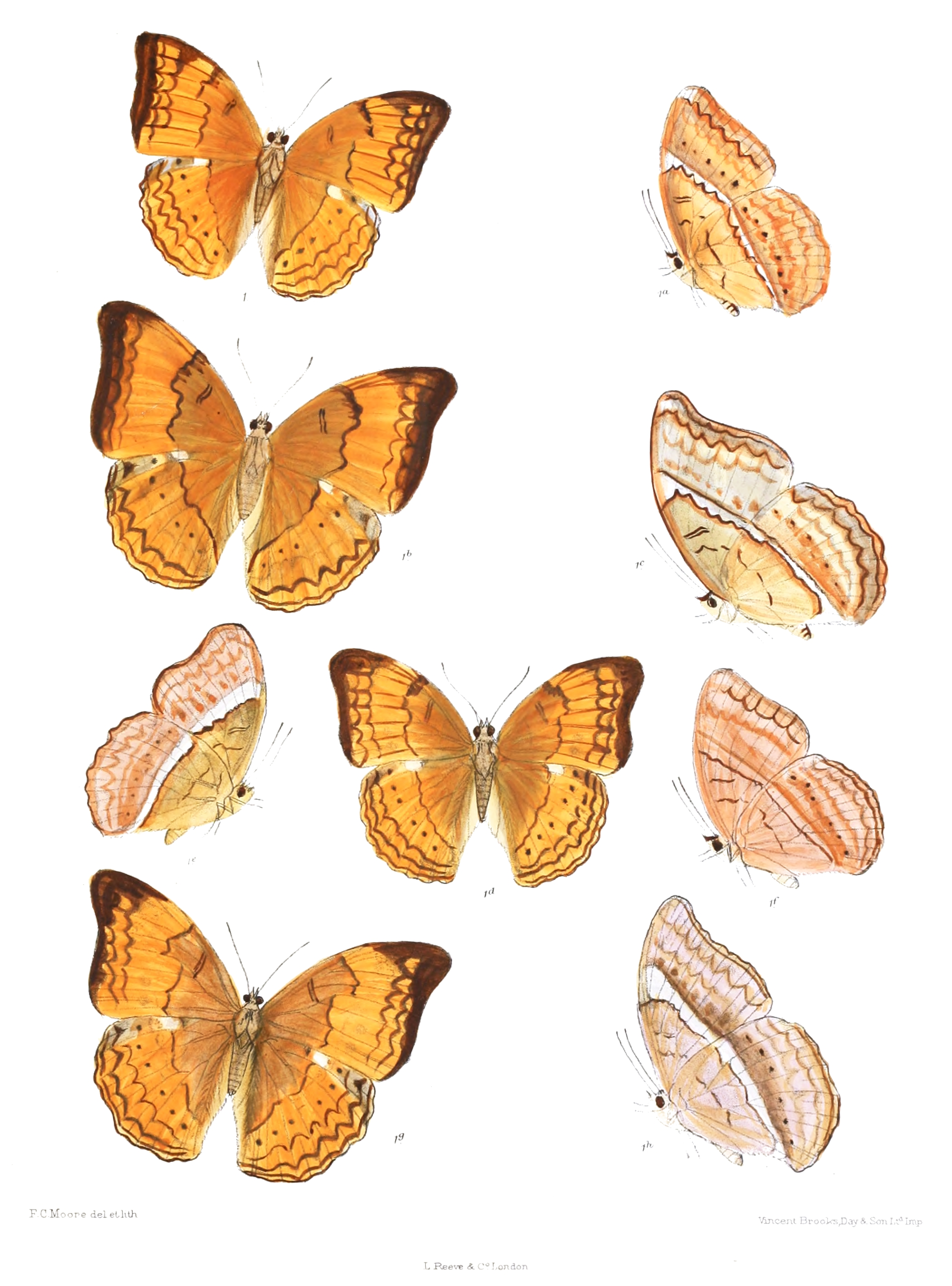
Illustration

== Distribution ==
The butterfly is mainly found in South India and Sri Lanka.

== Symbolism ==
In 2019, Tamil yeoman was declared as the state butterfly of the Indian state of Tamil Nadu. As per the Government of Tamil Nadu, it was chosen for its name and presence in the state, and for the conservation of its major habitat, the Western Ghats.
