= List of Tamil flags =

This is a list of historical and modern flags used by the Tamil people.

== Modern Tamil flags ==
=== Indian Tamil flags ===
Name	Image	Description
Banner of the Government of Tamil Nadu		The banner of the Government of Tamil Nadu depicts the Emblem of Tamil Nadu displayed on a white field. The emblem consists of the National Emblem of India flanked on either side by an Indian flag. Behind the national emblem, is the image of a Gopuram tower based on the West Tower of Madurai Meenakshi Temple.

=== Sri Lankan Tamil flags ===
Name	Image	Description
Sri Lankan Tamil Ethnic flag		The Sri Lankan Tamils use a horizontally split flag in red and yellow. These colors are considered as the national colors of the unrecognized state of Tamil Eelam.
Flag of Tamil Eelam		Another famous flag of the Sri Lankan Tamils is the flag of Tamil Eelam, the Puli Kodi (tiger flag). The flag has emblem depicting a tiger jumping through a circle of bullets, with crossed black bayonets on a red background. This flag has its origin from the Tamil separation movement in Sri Lanka. The tiger symbol was adopted from the emblem of the Chola Empire, it should reflect the martial history (Veera varalaru) and the national upheaval of the Tamils. The crossed bayonets were based on the historical crossed sword emblem of Vannimai and represent the armed resistance. This flag was created by the Liberation Tigers of Tamil Eelam (LTTE) in 1977 and was later in 1990 designated as the National flag of Tamil Eelam. Today, the flag is often seen in Tamil diaspora protests all over the world.

== Historical Tamil flags ==
State	Flag	Image	Description
Chola Dynasty	Pouncing Tiger		The tiger flag of Chola is mentioned in the Periya Puranam.
Vanniar (Chieftain)	Crossed Swords		The flag of Pandara Vanniyan, the last Tamil ruler of Vannimai, was "Crossed Swords".
Pudukkottai state	Lion		The emblem of Pudukkottai state was a lion with the Hanuman flag in its right fore paw on a green background.

== See also ==
- Proposed flag of Tamil Nadu (1970)
