= Emblem of Tamil Nadu =

- Armiger: Government of Tamil Nadu
- Adopted: 1949
- Shield: Meenakshi Temple
- Motto: Vāymaiyē vellum (Truth Alone Triumphs)

The Emblem of Tamil Nadu is the official state emblem of the Indian state of Tamil Nadu. It is used as the seal of the Government of Tamil Nadu.

Designed in 1949 by R. Krishna Rao, the emblem consists of the Lion Capital of Ashoka without the bell lotus foundation, flanked on either side by the Indian flag with an image of a gopuram of a Hindu temple in the background. The round emblem is flanked by the words "Tamiḻnāṭu aracu" ("Government of Tamil Nadu") and "Vāymaiyē vellum" ("Truth Alone Triumphs") in Tamil.

== Designer ==
The state emblem was designed in 1949 by R. Krishna Rao from Madurai. Rao, who was a professor at the Government College of Fine Arts in Chennai, was approached to design the emblem in 1948.

== Design ==
Seal of Government of Tamil Nadu

The round seal consists of the Lion Capital of Ashoka without the bell lotus foundation, flanked on either side by the Indian flag. Behind the capital is an image of a gopuram of a Hindu temple. Around the rim of the seal runs two inscriptions in Tamil script. In the top, it is mentioned "Tamiḻ Nāṭu aracu", which translates to "Government of Tamil Nadu", and the at the bottom, it states "Vāymaiyē vellum" which translates to "Truth Alone Triumphs". It is the only Indian state emblem that has the Indian flag and a temple tower on its seal. As per the designer Rao, the image of the gopuram is based on the west tower of the Madurai Meenakshi Temple.

The Government of Tamil Nadu uses the emblem placed onto a white background as its official seal.

== Historical emblems ==
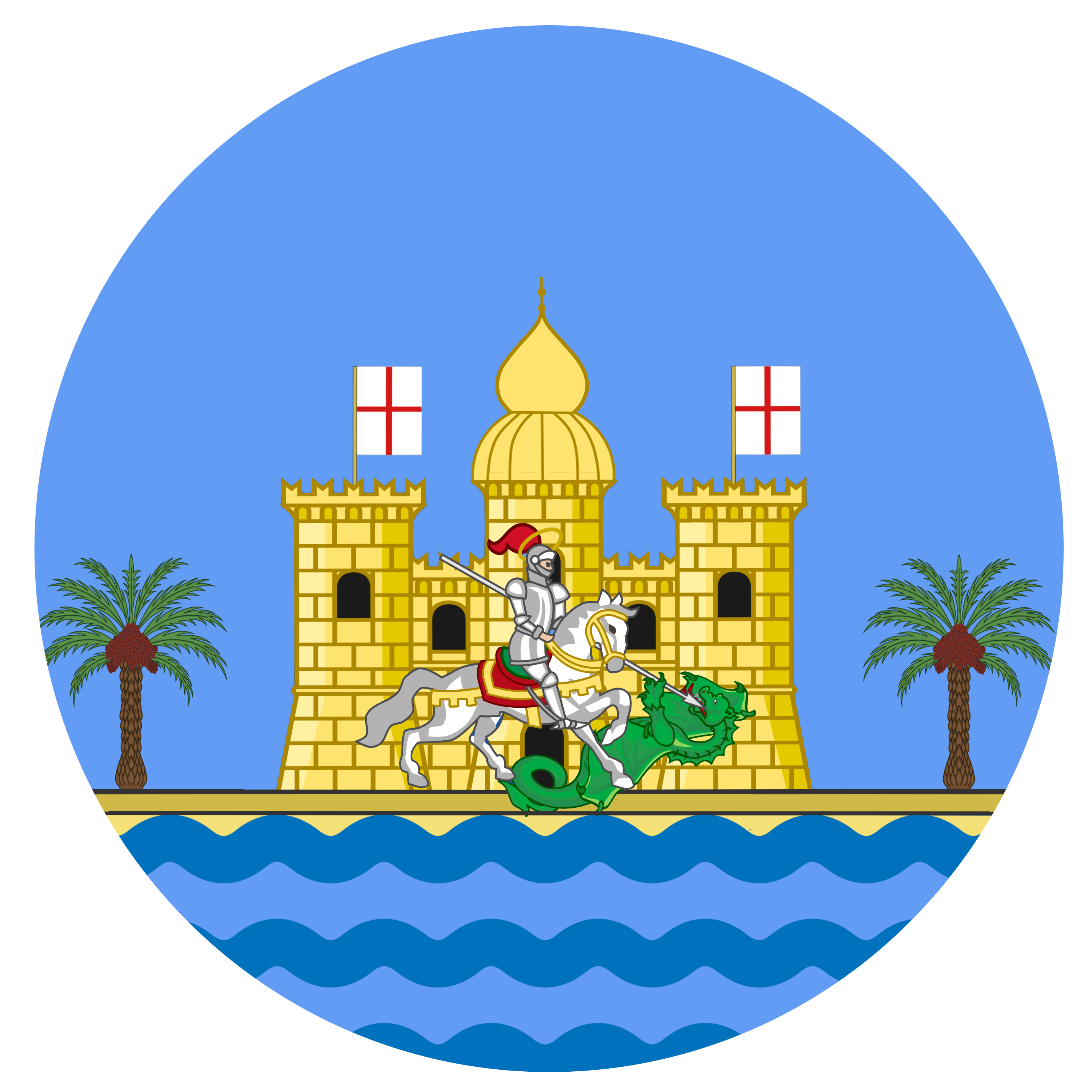
Emblem of Madras Presidency of British India

== See also ==
- Flag of Tamil Nadu
- National Emblem of India
- List of Indian state emblems
- List of Tamil Nadu state symbols
- Tamil Thai Valthu
