= List of Tamil Nadu state symbols =

Tamil Nadu is the southernmost state of India. It is the home of the Tamils, who speak the Tamil language. The Government of Tamil Nadu has designated various symbols that represent the state.

== State Symbols ==
Title	Symbol	Image	Notes
Emblem	Emblem of Tamil Nadu		The emblem is used as the seal of the Government of Tamil Nadu. It was designed in 1949 by R. Krishna Rao from Madurai. The round seal consists of the Lion Capital of Ashoka without the bell lotus foundation, flanked on either side by the Indian flag. Behind the capital is an image of a gopuram of a Hindu temple. Around the rim of the seal runs two inscriptions in Tamil script. In the top, it is mentioned "Tamil Natu aracu", which translates to "Government of Tamil Nadu", and the at the bottom, it states "Vaymaiye vellum" which translates to "Truth Alone Triumphs". As per Rao, the image of the gopuram is based on the west tower of the Madurai Meenakshi Temple. It is the only Indian state emblem that has the Indian flag and a Hindu temple tower on its seal.
Motto	Vaymaiye Vellum ("Truth Alone Triumphs")		Vaymaiyae Vellum is the Tamil translation of Satyameva Jayate ("Truth Alone Triumphs"), the national motto of India. It is a quote taken from the Mundaka Upanishad, which forms part of the sacred Hindu literature of the Vedas.
Anthem	Tamil Thai Valthu ("Invocation to Tamil Mother")		The original song was written by Manonmaniam Sundaram Pillai (1855–1897), as an invocation to Tamil Thai (Tamil Mother) in the prelude to the play Manonmaniam in 1891. A rendition of the song was later composed by M. S. Viswanathan, and sung by T. M. Soundarajan and P. Susheela. On 23 November 1970, the Government of Tamil Nadu announced that verses of the song would be recited as Tamil Thai Valthu at the beginning of state government functions. On 17 December 2021, the state government formally declared it as the official state song.
Day	Tamil Nadu Day; Tamil Nadu Dhinam		The Indian states were linguistically organised by the States Reorganisation Act, 1956 which established the current boundaries of the state and came to effect on 1 November 1956. A resolution to rename Madras State as Tamil Nadu as passed by the Tamil Nadu Legislative Assembly on 18 July 1967, and the state was officially renamed on 14 January 1969. In 2019, the Government of Tamil Nadu announced that 1 November will be celebrated annually as "Tamil Nadu Day" marking the date of formation of the state. In July 2022, the state government announced that 18 July of every year will be celebrated as "Tamil Nadu Day" beginning that year to mark the renaming of the state.
Language (Note: Tamil is declared as the official language of the state. English is used as an additional official language.)	Tamil		Tamil is the official language of the state as per the Tamil Nadu Official Language Act, 1956. It is also the widely spoken language by the state's population. It is one of the oldest languages, with a written history dating to at least the third century BCE. It was the first language to be recognised as a classical language of India on 12 October 2004.
Animal	Nilgiri tahr (Nilgiritragus hylocrius); Varaiyaadu		Nilgiri tahr is an endangered ungulate that is endemic to the Nilgiri Hills and the southern portion of the Western and Eastern Ghats in Tamil Nadu and Kerala. It is the only species in the genus Nilgiritragus. It is a stocky built goat with a short and coarse grey fur with backward-curving horns. The 'Project Nilgiri Tahr', launched by the Government of Tamil Nadu in 2022, is aimed at conserving the species. As a part of the project, 7 October as the 'Nilgiri Tahr Day' in the state.
Bird	Emerald dove (Chalcophaps indica); Maragadhappura		Emerald dove is a common pigeon occupying a wide variety of habitats across the Indian subcontinent including Tamil Nadu. It is a stocky, medium-sized pigeon with bright emerald green coloured wings.
Butterfly	Tamil yeoman (Cirrochroa thais); Tamil Maravan		Tamil yeoman is a species of nymphalidae found in the Western Ghats in South India and Sri Lanka. It has bright reddish yellow coloured wings with black tips and a white spot. It was declared as the state butterfly on 26 June 2019. As per the state government, it was chosen for its name and presence in the state, and for the conservation of its major habitat, the Western Ghats.
Flower	Gloriosa lily (Gloriosa superba); Chenkaanthal		Gloriosa lilly is a flowering plant found across the tropical regions of South Asia and Africa. The plant produces several solitary bright red and yellow coloured flowers on long stalks. It is locally known as Chenkaanthal and Karthigai Poo. While used in folk medicine, most of the parts of the plant are highly toxic.
Fruit	Jackfruit (Artocarpus heterophyllus); Palaapalam		The jackfruit is a large evergreen tree that in the mulberry family of Moraceae. It might have originated in the Western Ghats and is widely cultivated in the region. It produces the largest of all tree-borne fruits, weighing up to 50 kg (110 lb). The fruit consists of several yellow coloured fleshy bulbs each of which encloses a single seed. The fruit bulbs and seeds are edible, and the sap, leaves, and wood have various applications. Both the raw and ripe fruits are extensively used in Tamil cuisine.
Tree	Palmyra palm (Borassus flabellifer); Panai Maram		Palmyra palm is a fan palm found in the tropical regions of South Asia. A tall, sturdy tree, it has large fan-shaped leaves and produces bunches of large fruits containing sweet, watery kernels (called "nungu" locally). It is drought resistant and can have a productive life of 100+ years. Most of the parts of the tree including its fruit, sap, leaves, and trunk, find extensive applications. The fruits and sprouts are edible while the sap is used to make palm wine and jaggery. The tree is known by several names in Tamil literature and forms a major part of the Tamil culture.
Sport	Kabaddi		Kabaddi is a contact and team sport. The objective of the game is for a single player ("raider") to run into the opposing team's half of the court, touch out as many of their players and return without being tackled by the defenders. Points are scored when players are tagged by the raider or when opposing team tackles the raider. The sport has been played for more than four thousand years. The term kabaddi is said to have originated from the Tamil words "kai" and "pidi" meaning "to hold hands".

== See also ==
- List of Indian state symbols
- Emblems of Indian States
