= Voice of Tigers =

Killinochchi; Sri Lanka
- Broadcast area: Sri Lanka

Programming
- Language: Tamil

Ownership
- Owner: Tamil Tigers

History
- First air date: 21 November 1990

Voice of Tigers was a radio station run by the Tamil Tigers. It was located in then rebel-controlled Killinochchi. It was founded in 1988 as a newspaper and it became a radio station on 21 November 1990.

The radio station was subject to air strikes by the Sri Lankan Air Force which killed several staff workers.
