= Pandarikulam =

Pandarikulam பண்டாரிகுளம் පණ්ඩාරිකුළම්
- Suburb
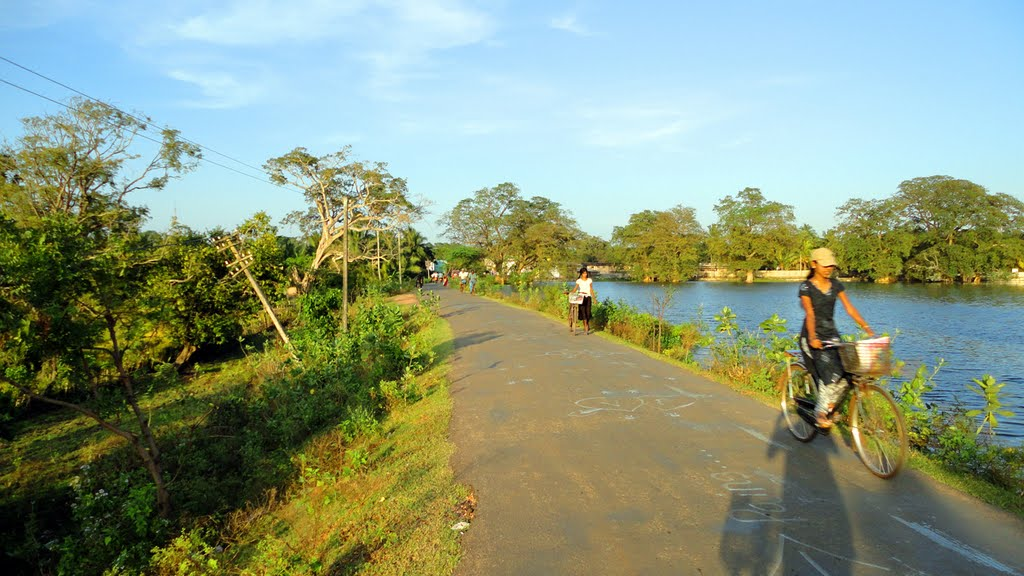
- Road connecting Vavuniya and Pandarikulam

- Map of Pandarikulam
- Interactive map of Pandarikulam
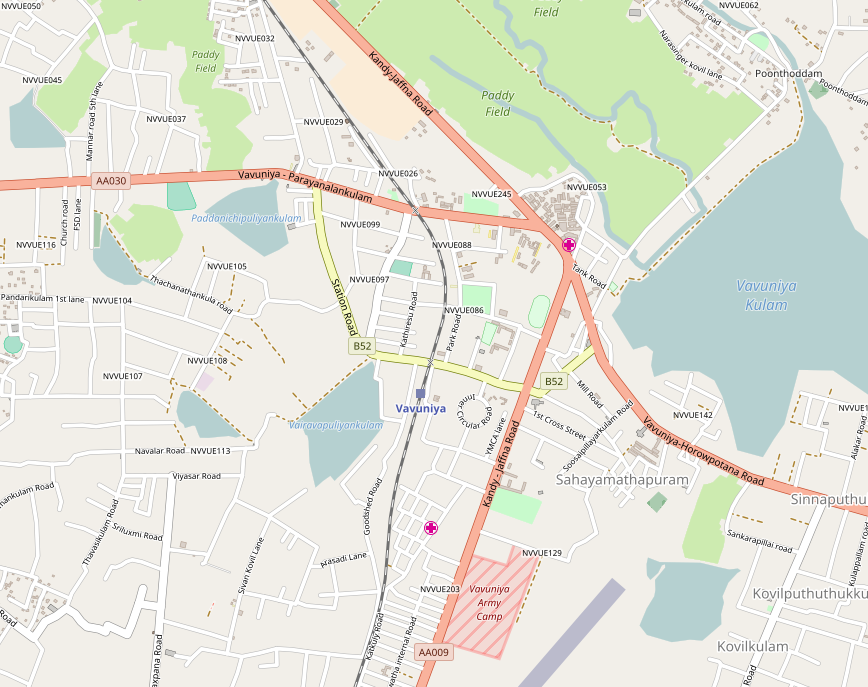
- Location of the Grama Niladhari Office, Pandarikulam (214E) in Greater Vavuniya Pandarikulam (Northern Province) Pandarikulam (Sri Lanka)
- Coordinates: 8.7552°N 80.4831°E
- Country: Sri Lanka
- Province: Northern Province
- District: Vavuniya
- Municipal Council: Vavuniya Municipal Council
- Weather
- Named for: Pandara Wanniyan
- Neighbourhood: Pandarikulam East; Pandarikulam West; Thadchchanathankulam; Rauppakam

Government
  - Type: Municipal Council
  - Body: Grama Niladhari
  - GS: Thuja K
  - Member of Municipal Council: Premathas S

Area
  - Total: 2.73 km^{2} (1.05 sq mi)
  - Water: 0.0317 km^{2} (0.0122 sq mi) 1.16%
- Elevation: 104 m (341 ft)

Population
  - Total: 6,013▼
  - Density: 2,200/km^{2} (5,700/sq mi)
- Time zone: UTC+5:30 (Sri Lanka Standard Time Zone)
- Postal Code: 43000
- Area code: 024
- ISO 3166 code: LK-44

Pandarikulam (/pʌnˈdɑːrɪkʊlʌm/, (PUN-daa-ree-KU-luhm), also known as Pandarikkulam (officially designated as Vavuniya 03 or 214E), is a prominent suburban area located within the northern region of Sri Lanka, in close proximity to the town of Vavuniya. Approximately 2.1 kilometres (1.3 mi) from Vavuniya's town centre, Pandarikulam serves as an integral part of the town's urban expansion, blending the conveniences of urban living with the tranquility characteristic of suburban environments.

The name "Pandarikulam" is rendered in Tamil: பண்டாரிகுளம், romanized: Paṇṭārikuḷam, IPA: [paɳɖaːriɡuɭam]; and in Sinhala: පණ්ඩාරිකුලම්, romanized: Paṇḍārikulam, IPA: [paɳɖaːrikulam]; reflecting the cultural and linguistic diversity of the region. Historically a distinct suburb, it has been incorporated into the broader urban fabric of Vavuniya as the town's boundaries have expanded.

== Etymology ==
The name "Pandarikulam" offers a compelling glimpse into the historical and cultural evolution of this suburb. Originally known as Tamil: கருங்காலியடித்தோட்டம், romanized: Karuṅkāliyaṭittōṭṭam, lit. 'Ebony Garden', the name reflects the region's abundance of ebony trees.

During the era of the Vanni kings, the suburb gained prominence as it was granted to the citizens of the Pandaram community. These individuals were notable for their religious contributions, including the crafting of garlands and participation in worship rituals at a Shaivaite temple dedicated to the goddess Mari in the Suburb.

Subsequent historical records from Vavuniya document the transformation of the suburb's name. Initially referred to as Pandarakulam (Tamil: பண்டாரகுளம், romanized: Paṇṭārakuḷam), the suburb later adopted the name Pandarikulam in honour of King Pandaravanniyan, a heroic figure whose legacy left a lasting impact on the Vanni region.

== Location ==
Pandarikulam is a suburb located approximately 2.1 kilometres (1.3 mi) from the town of Vavuniya in Sri Lanka. It is defined by distinct geographical boundaries, with Kurumankadu to the north, Vairavarpuliyankulam to the east, Ukkulankulam to the west, and Thonikkal to the south.

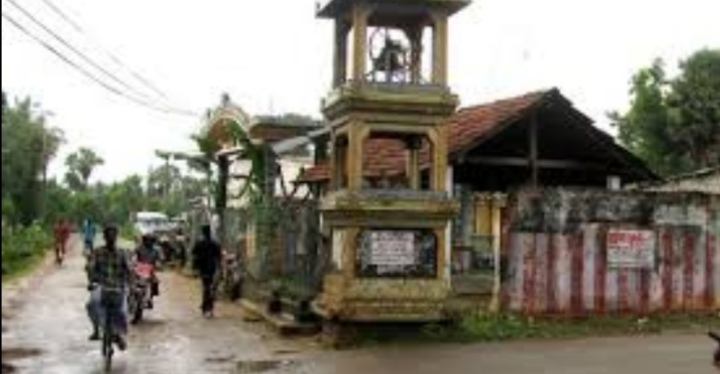
Pandarikulam after Civil War in 2009.

== Topography ==
Pandarikulam covers a total area of 1.01 square kilometres (0.39 sq mi), with a significant portion consisting of water bodies. The area is situated on a slanted slope within the plains of Vavuniya, with a granite-based soil foundation. The primary water body in Pandarikulam spans 0.0317 square kilometres (0.0122 sq mi), contributing to the region’s agriculture by supporting irrigation for crops. The water is vital for local farming, although fishing is prohibited due to the presence of ornamental fish in the pond. The total vegetation area in Pandarikulam covers 0.0058 square kilometres (0.0022 sq mi), with key crops including brinjal, chili, and normal keerai. Additionally, the area has a substantial rice cultivation area of 0.1740 square kilometres (0.0672 sq mi), which plays a significant role in the region's economy, with rice farming being one of the main sources of income for the suburb.

Area of Pandarikulam
1. Water Body (3.14%)
2. Vegetation (0.57%)
3. Rice Cultivation (17.2%)
4. Residential (79.1%)

The civil war in Sri Lanka led to significant population displacement, with many people from Jaffna migrating southward to the Vanni region, specifically to Vavuniya. This influx of migrants, particularly in the decades following the war, caused considerable changes to the region, including the topography of Pandarikulam.

Originally, Pandarikulam was a water pond covering an area of approximately 0.0793 square kilometres (0.0306 sq mi). However, due to rapid migration and subsequent human activities, the pond's size has been reduced. Over a span of 10 to 20 years, the pond's area shrank to approximately 0.0317 square kilometres (0.0122 sq mi), resulting in a loss of 0.0476 square kilometres (0.0184 sq mi) of water-covered land. This represents a loss of approximately 60% of the pond's original area.

Depletion of Water Body Over Time
1. Remaining Water Area (39.9%)
2. Lost Water Area (60.1%)

The transformation of Pandarikulam was driven by the filling of the pond with earth and the construction of new roads to better connect the main town of Vavuniya with surrounding areas. These developments reflect both the urgent need for infrastructure and the changes to the landscape caused by the rapid migration.

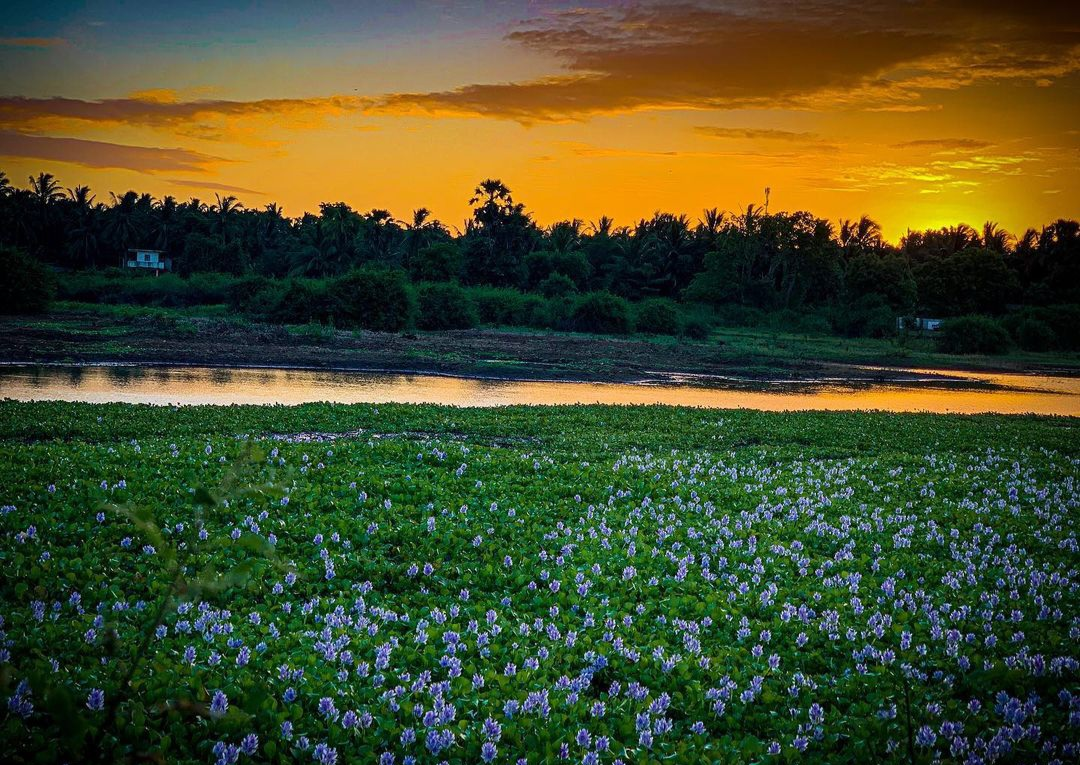
A sunset view of the Pandarikulam Tank during the rainy season, just after the drizzle stopped.

== History ==
Pandarikulam is a suburb located in the Vavuniya District of Sri Lanka, renowned for its rich historical and cultural heritage shaped by centuries of influence from various kingdoms and cultures. Its historical roots trace back to the governance of Tamil kings during the Iyakkar and Nagar periods in ancient Sri Lanka. The construction of numerous tanks and the placement of Naga Sacred Guard Stones with inscriptions are testaments to the Tamil kings' lasting impact on the region.

During the Anuradhapura period, following the arrival of the Sinhalese in Sri Lanka, Pandarikulam became part of the Rajarata kingdom. The suburb flourished agriculturally under the influence of the Rajarata kingdom, leaving a legacy that endures to this day. The Chola invasion later revived Shaivism and Tamil culture in the area. Subsequently, the Pandyas’ conquest of Sri Lanka, following their defeat of the Cholas in Tamil Nadu, brought Pandarikulam under Pandya rule. However, with the dispersion of the Pandyas during the Delhi Sultanate invasion, the Vanni people, who had arrived with the Cholas, asserted their independence and established the Vanni Nation. During this period, the region alternated between serving as an independent entity and a vassal state under the Jaffna Kingdom, until the fall of the Jaffna Kingdom to the Portuguese.

In the Dutch colonial period, Pandarikulam's history was marked by the resistance led by King Pandaravanniyan, who opposed Dutch incursions in coastal Sri Lanka. Despite his efforts, the Dutch assassinated the king and displayed his body publicly to intimidate the populace. This event inspired the naming of ancient suburbs in his honor, including Pandarikulam.

Following the defeat of Pandaravanniyan, the Dutch ceded control of coastal Sri Lanka to the British in 1796, marking a turning point in the region's history. Dutch Lieutenant Von Driberg notably remarked on the heroism of Pandaravanniyan, describing him as unparalleled.

Pandarikulam has undergone significant demographic changes since Sri Lanka's independence in 1948, driven by migration, oppression, and the consequences of war. Before the Civil War, Pandarikulam was one of the earliest inhabited areas in the Vavuniya District, where much of the land was forest-covered. Early settlements were concentrated near the Pandarikulam Amman Kovil, with the Tamil population organised by caste, including individuals from the Vannar caste and some upper caste educated families from Vavuniya. The Civil War led to an influx of wealthy and educated Tamils from Jaffna, transforming Pandarikulam from a small village into a thriving suburb. This migration spurred rapid growth and development in the area. During the early 1980s, the ancient worship of the Mari Goddess by the Vanni people shifted to Agamic traditions, initially incorporating animal sacrifices. Over time, these practices evolved to reflect the cultural and religious progress of the community. Today, following the end of the war, Pandarikulam stands as a vibrant and dynamic suburb in the Vavuniya District.

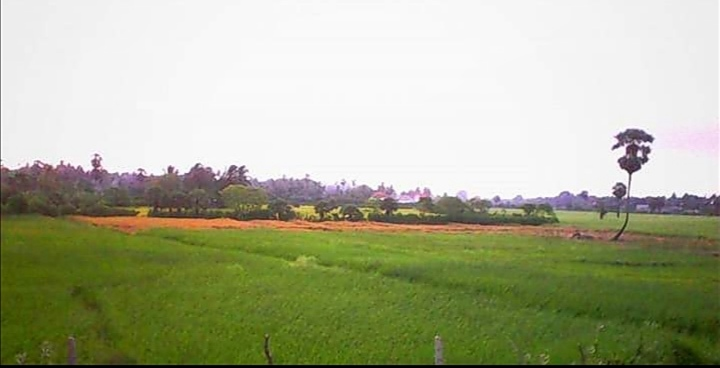
Pandarikulam paddy fields

== Administrative overview ==
Pandarikulam and Ukkulankulam, while often considered separate suburbs, share the same administrative designation, 214E, under the Grama Niladhari system 4-3-09-200 is the location code for the Grama Niladhari Division (GND) covering both Ukkulankulam and Pandarikulam. Historically, Ukkulankulam was a smaller area compared to Pandarikulam and its larger neighbor, Koomankulam. However, rapid suburban expansion has redefined boundaries, with parts of the original villages now incorporated into Pandarikulam, Vairavapuliyankulam, and Ukkulankulam. Currently, Ukkulankulam functions as a small enclave within Pandarikulam. For administrative purposes, Ukkulankulam falls under the Vavuniya South Tamil Pradeshiya Sabha, electing two representatives, while Pandarikulam is governed by the Vavuniya Municipal Council, with one representative. Despite this division, both areas share the same Grama Niladhari and a polling station at Vipulanantha College. Hall-1 serves Pandarikulam, and Hall-2 serves Ukkulankulam. Both suburbs are under the Pandarikulam Police Subdivision, part of the Vavuniya Police Division.

== Demographics ==
Pandarikulam is a suburb predominantly inhabited by Tamil speakers, with the majority identifying as Hindu Shaivaites. A smaller segment of the Tamil population practices Christianity. Notably, a local church is maintained by Hindu Shaivaite families, reflecting the area's spirit of religious harmony. The Sinhalese community in Pandarikulam is minimal, comprising fewer than ten individuals, primarily policemen, who typically speak Tamil as a second language and follow Buddhism. Additionally, a minority of Muslims, who practice Islam, are not permanent residents of Pandarikulam but live in a nearby Muslim suburb and operate fish shops in the area.

Ethnicity
1. Sri Lankan Tamils (99.8%)
2. Sinhalese (0.07%)
3. Sri Lankan Moors (0.03%)
Religions in Pandarikulam
1. Hindu(Shaivites) (94.8%)
2. Christians (4.99%)
3. Buddhists (0.07%)
4. Muslims (0.03%)

== Historical place ==
Pandarikulam, a region of notable historical significance, is home to two prominent landmarks. The first is the Pandarikulam Muthumari Amman Kovil, an ancient Hindu temple dedicated to the goddess Mari Amman. Revered as one of the oldest pilgrimage sites for the ancient Vanni people in the Vavuniya district, the temple is historically significant as the first of the four directional temples built in ancient Vavuniya. Its primary purpose was to protect the local community from diseases and invoke rainfall for agricultural prosperity. According to local folklore, individuals who carefully weave garlands for this temple are believed to also weave them for King Pandaravanniyan. Serving as the western guard temple, the Pandarikulam Muthumari Amman Kovil remains an enduring symbol of the region's cultural and spiritual heritage.

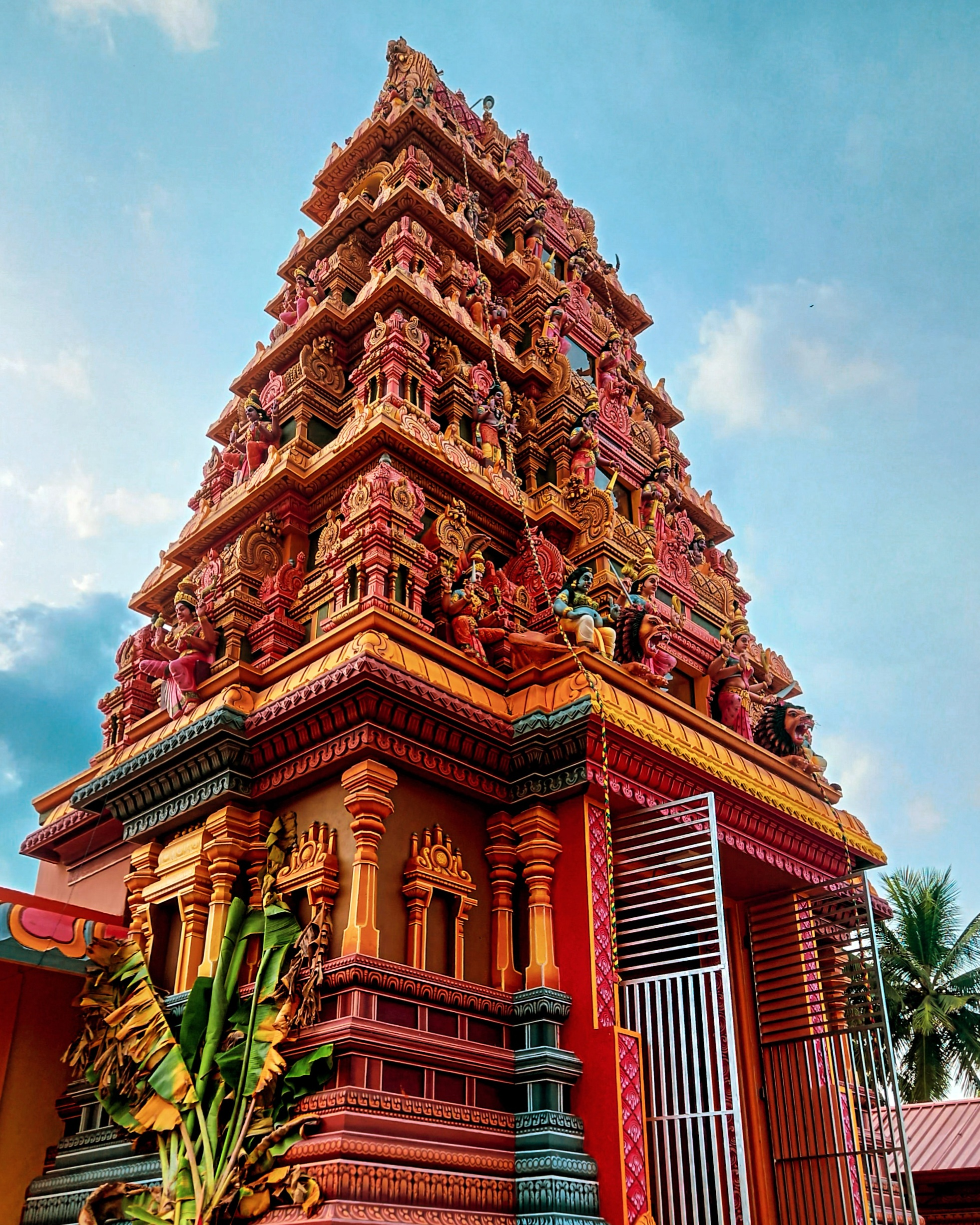
Pandarikulam Amman Kovil, After Maha Kumbabishekam

Another important historical site in Pandarikulam is the step arch, a remnant from the British colonial era. This structure is linked to the construction of the railroad connecting Colombo to Jaffna, with Vavuniya emerging as a key location for replenishing water for steam engines. Vavuniya was known for its numerous tanks, including the prominent Vairavarpuliyankulam near the Vavuniya railway station. However, due to the tank's considerable depth and safety concerns, an alternative water source was sought. Pandarikulam, with its shallower tank and ample water supply, became the most suitable option for water extraction. During the railway's construction, slaves were tasked with this work, and the step arch was erected to provide them a place to rest.

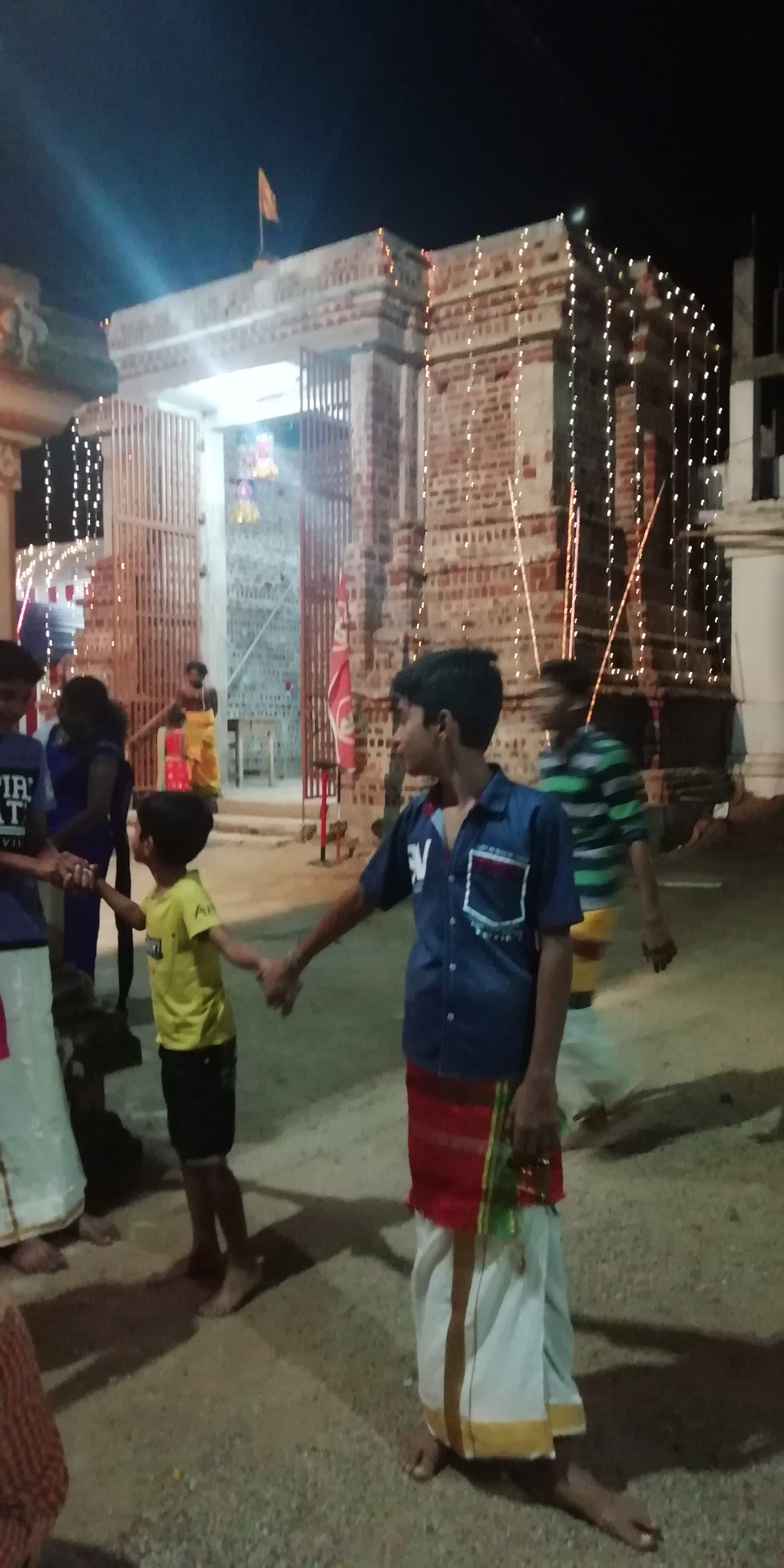
Pandarikulam Amman Kovil, During Construction Period

Local folklore in the present-day Vanni region also suggests that one of the suburbs starting with "Pandara" may be the final resting place of the heroic king Pandaravanniyan. However, the location of his tomb remains a mystery, much like the enigma of King Richard III's burial site.

== Education ==
Pandarikulam, located in Vavuniya, is home to a diverse range of educational institutions that significantly contribute to the region's academic landscape. Among the most prominent is Vipulanantha College, a government-funded school.

The suburb also hosts specialised institutions, such as the Maths Centre, which provides additional support and enrichment for students in mathematics.

== Transportation ==
Pandarikulam, located near Vavuniya, benefits from excellent connectivity through various transportation options. The Vavuniya Railway Station, situated about 1.8 kilometres (1.1 mi) from the locality, serves as the primary rail link to the area, ensuring easy access for commuters. While the Vavuniya Airport is currently inactive, buses provide an alternative means of transportation. The Vavuniya Bus Stand plays a key role in facilitating travel, with bus services like route $\frac{836}{6}$, connecting Vavuniya Town to Koomankulam via Pandarikulam and Ukkulankulam, offering convenient travel for residents and visitors.

== Weather ==
Pandarikulam experiences a tropical monsoon climate, characterised by warm and humid conditions throughout the year. The region benefits from a distinct rainy season during the inter-monsoon periods, which supports its agricultural activities.

Climate data for Pandarikulam
| Month | Jan | Feb | Mar | Apr | May | Jun | Jul | Aug | Sep | Oct | Nov | Dec | Year |
|---|---|---|---|---|---|---|---|---|---|---|---|---|---|
| Mean daily maximum °F | 86 | 90 | 95 | 100 | 100 | 100 | 95 | 95 | 95 | 91 | 88 | 82 | 93 |
| Mean daily minimum °F | 72 | 72 | 73 | 77 | 79 | 81 | 79 | 79 | 79 | 77 | 73 | 73 | 76 |
| Average precipitation inches | 3.0 | 2.2 | 1.9 | 4.4 | 3.1 | 1.3 | 1.9 | 2.5 | 3.1 | 7.8 | 9.6 | 6.7 | 47.5 |
| Mean daily maximum °C | 30 | 32 | 35 | 38 | 38 | 38 | 35 | 35 | 35 | 33 | 31 | 28 | 34 |
| Mean daily minimum °C | 22 | 22 | 23 | 25 | 26 | 27 | 26 | 26 | 26 | 25 | 23 | 23 | 25 |
| Average precipitation mm | 75 | 55 | 48 | 112 | 79 | 34 | 49 | 63 | 80 | 198 | 244 | 170 | 1,207 |
| Average precipitation days | 5 | 4 | 4 | 7 | 5 | 3 | 4 | 4 | 5 | 12 | 14 | 15 | 82 |
Source: Department of Meteorology Sri Lanka
