= Ukkulankulam =

Ukkulankulam உக்குளாங்குளம் උකුලංගුලම්
- Suburb
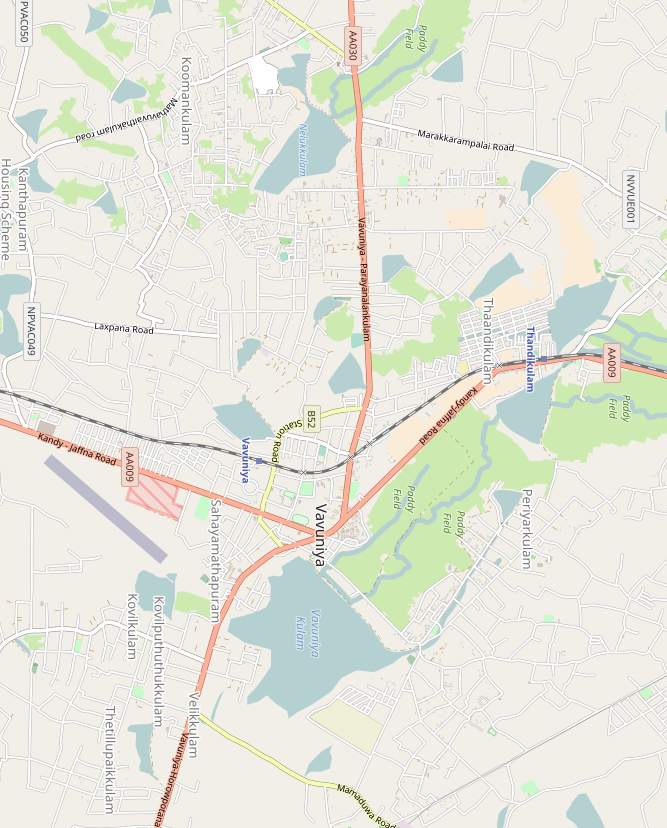
- Location within Greater Vavuniya Location within Northern Province Location within Sri Lanka
- Coordinates: 8°45′14″N 80°28′30″E
- Country: Sri Lanka
- Province: Northern Province, Sri Lanka
- District: Vavuniya
- Urban Council: Vavuniya South Tamil Prasdesihya Sabha
- Weather

Government
  - Type: Prasdesihya Sabha
  - Body: Grama Niladhari
  - GS: S. Rahulprasadh

Area
  - Total: 12.6 km^{2} (4.9 sq mi)
- Elevation: 104 m (341 ft)

Population
  - Total: 3,459
- Time zone: UTC+5:30 (Sri Lanka Standard Time Zone)
- Postal Code: 43000
- Area code: 024

Ukkulankulam (official designation 214E Vavuniya South), (Tamil: உக்குளாங்குளம், romanized: Ukkuḷāṅkuḷam; Sinhala: උකුලංගුලම්, romanized: ukulaṁgulam) is a suburb of Vavuniya in northern Sri Lanka. Ukkulankulam was a part of Pandarikulam during the reign of the Vanni king. Today there are two different villages but administratively the two are considered one and the same. However there are separate local council members.

== Etymology ==
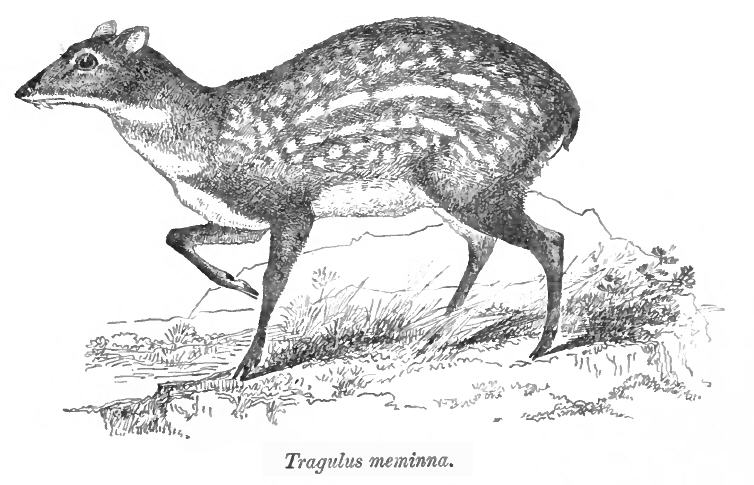
Sri Lankan spotted chevrotain

The name of the village is derived from the presence of the Sri Lankan spotted chevrotain, known as Ukkiḻāṉ, in the area.

== Location ==
Ukkulankulam is located 4 km (2.5 mi) away from Vavuniya. It is bordered to the north and east by Pandarikulam, to the west by Kurumankadu, and to the south by Koomankulam.

== Historical sites ==
The Shiva Lingam found in the Ukkulankulam Shiva Temple is the only 5-faced Shiva Lingam in Sri Lanka. The sanctum sanctorum of the temple is similar to that of the Kasi Vishwanathar Temple of India.

== Education ==
- Kanara Pre-School

== See also ==
- List of towns in Northern Province, Sri Lanka
