= Vairavarpuliyankulam =

Vairavarpuliyankulam வைரவர்புளியங்குளம் වයිරවර්පුලියන්කුලම්
- City
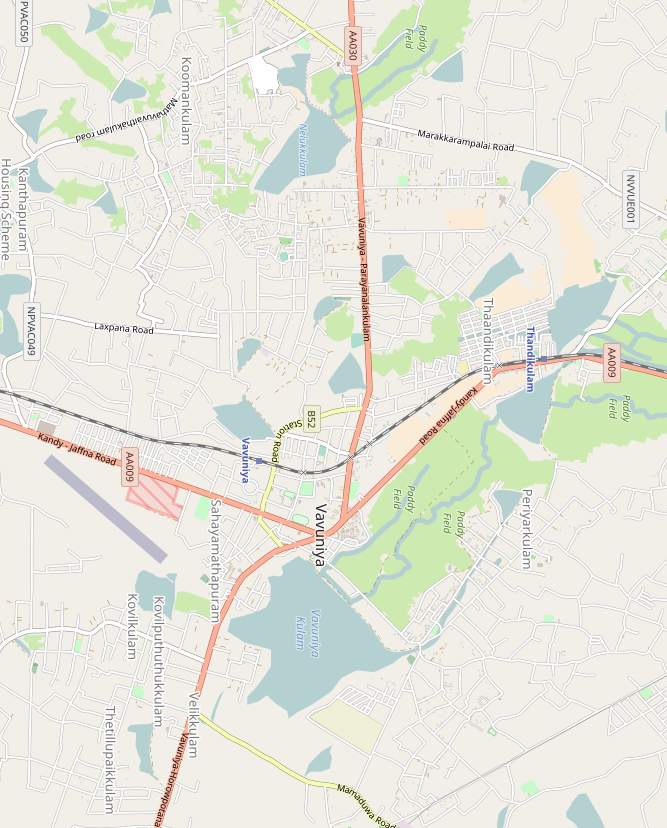
- Location within Greater Vavuniya Location within Northern Province Location within Sri Lanka
- Coordinates: 8°45′31″N 80°28′40″E
- Country: Sri Lanka
- Province: Northern Province, Sri Lanka
- District: Vavuniya
- Urban Council: Vavuniya Urban Council
- Weather
- Named for: Vairavar; Puḷiyamaram

Government
  - Type: Vavuniya Urban Council
  - Body: Grama Niladhari

Area
  - Total: 12.1 km^{2} (4.7 sq mi)
- Elevation: 104 m (341 ft)

Population
  - Total: 2,000 (approx.)
  - Density: 170/km^{2} (430/sq mi)
- Time zone: UTC+5:30 (Sri Lanka Standard Time Zone)
- Postal Code: 43000
- Area code: 024

Vairavarpuliyankulam (Official Name 214D), (Tamil: வைரவர்புளியங்குளம், romanized: Vairavarpuḷiyaṅkuḷam; Sinhala: වයිරවර්පුලියන්කුලම්, romanized: Vayiravarpuliyankulam) is a suburb of Vavuniya in Sri Lanka. All government buildings for the Vavuniya district are located there. This is one of the place in Vavuniya, where Rich and educated people lives. Most of them are originally from Jaffna, came after massive displacement in 1996. Prices of the Land is so High and Living in Vairavarpuliyankulam is matter of Pride.

== Etymology ==
The area was a major tamarind forest, or 'puliyam' in Tamil. The people who lived in Vairavarpuliyankulam built a Hindu temple for the Shaivite deity, Vairavar, giving the village its name.

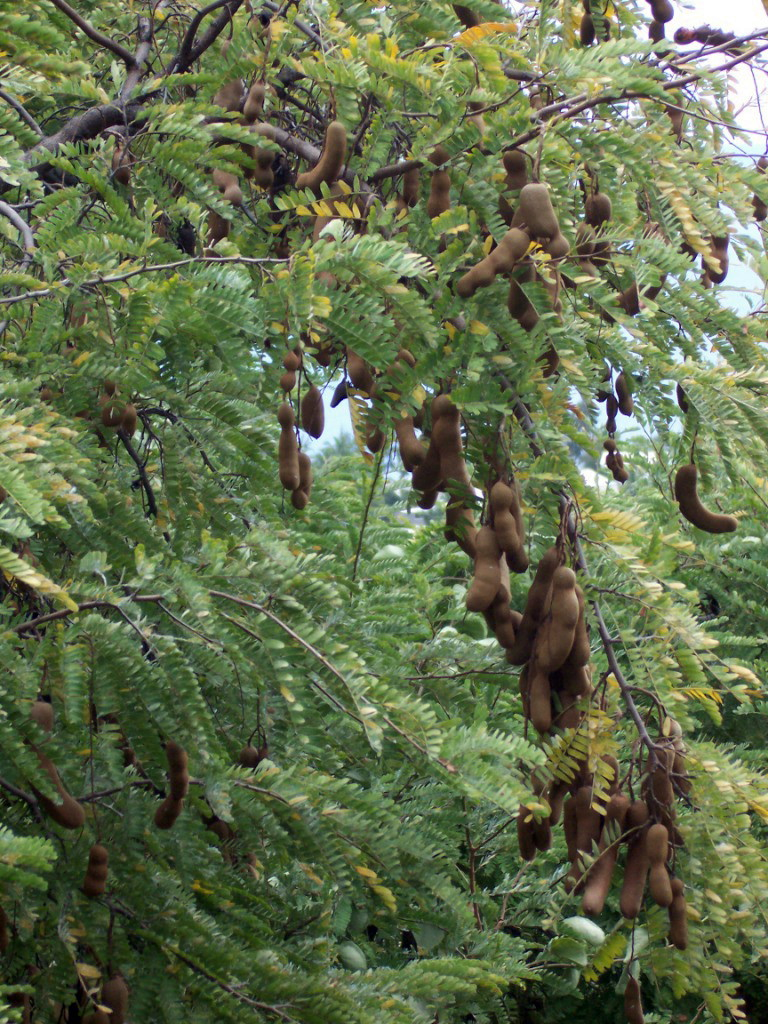
Puḷiya Maram

== Geography ==
Vairavarpuliyankulam is bordered to the north by Kurumankadu, to the east and south by Katkuly, and to the west by Pandarikulam.

== Education ==
Popular schools or other educational services in Vavuniya district are located in or close to the city.

== Transportation ==
Vavuniya Railway Station and Vavuniya Bus Stand are located there.

== Medical ==
Vavuniya General Hospital is located there.
