= Arawwala =

Arawwala ඇරැව්වල
- Village
- Location within Sri Lanka
- Coordinates: 6°49′50.80″N 79°56′6.10″E
- Country: Sri Lanka
- Province: Western Province
- District: Colombo District
- Time zone: UTC+5:30 (Sri Lanka Standard Time Zone)
- Postal Code: 10230

Arawwala or (Erewwala, Arewwala) is a town situated in the Kesbewa electorate, Colombo District, in the Western Province, Sri Lanka. It is located about 20 km distance via High Level (A4) & Maharagama - Piliyandala road from the commercial capital Colombo.

== About Arawwala ==
Arawwala is governed by the Kesbewa Urban Council. The village is divided into three Grama Niladhari divisions which is under Kesbewa Divisional Secretariat. Although village has an agricultural background, lifestyle has rapidly changed due to urbanization and possessed of facilities like supermarkets, clothing, food shops, factories, private educational institutes to fulfill the needs of villagers. Surrounding towns are Maharagama, Pannipitiya, Kottawa, Piliyandala, Bokundara. Arawwala has its own hereditary of low country “Thovil” or "Yathukarma". As a result, the village organizes an annual village ritual ceremony, called “Gammaduwa” by expecting the fertility, rain, prevention of disease & prosperity. Arawwala Nandimithra (ඇරැව්වල නන්දිමිත්‍ර) well known character as a short story writer and a novelist, Mr. Nandimithra has established himself as one of the best writers in the country.

== The Grama Niladhari Divisions ==
- Arawwala North (Grama Niladhari division 581 D)
- Arawwala East (Grama Niladhari division 581)
- Arawwala West (Grama Niladhari division 581 A)

== Arawwala Junction ==
A three way junction situated on the Maharagama - Piliyandala road. This junction is connected to Moraketiya junction by the Arawwala Road. Route No.212/341 buses operate through Arawwala. The most easily accessible cities from Arawwala are Maharagama and Piliyandala. Maharagama-Piliyandala (Route No-341) buses operate through Arawwala.

== Important Places In Arawwala ==
- Arawwala Purana Temple
- Cargills Food City - Arawwala
- Siri Wijaya Nandanaramaya (Egodawatte Temple)
- Siri Wijayasiriwardanaramaya (Doowa Temple)
- Vidyaloka Maha Vidyalaya
- Arawwala Dharmapala Maha Vidyalaya
- Linfield International College
- Colorzone Limited
