= Piliyandala =

Piliyandala පිළියන්දල பிலியந்தலை
- suburb
- Location within Sri Lanka
- Coordinates: 6°51′0″N 79°57′0″E
- Country: Sri Lanka
- Province: Western Province
- District: Colombo District
- Time zone: UTC+5:30 (Sri Lanka Standard Time Zone)
  - Summer (DST): UTC+6
- Postal Code: 10300

Piliyandala (Sinhala: පිළියන්දල, Tamil: பிலியந்தலை) is a suburb in Colombo District, Sri Lanka. It is situated approximately 18 kilometres (11 mi) south of Colombo.

== Piliyandala clock tower ==
According to local residents and documentation, Piliyandala clock tower is the second tallest in the island rising to a height of 78 feet with a 16-foot girth. The clock tower was erected by D. Simon Samarakoon in the memory of his parents Cornelis Wijewickrema Samarakoon and his wife. The foundation stone for the erection of the clock tower was laid by the then Minister of Local Government C.W.W. Kannangara on 11 September 1952. The construction being completed in seven months, the clock tower was commissioned on 30 April 1953 and has been running ever since.

The clock tower which is in existence for more than 70 years, is considered to be of archaeological value thus providing the Piliyandala town with a historical background.

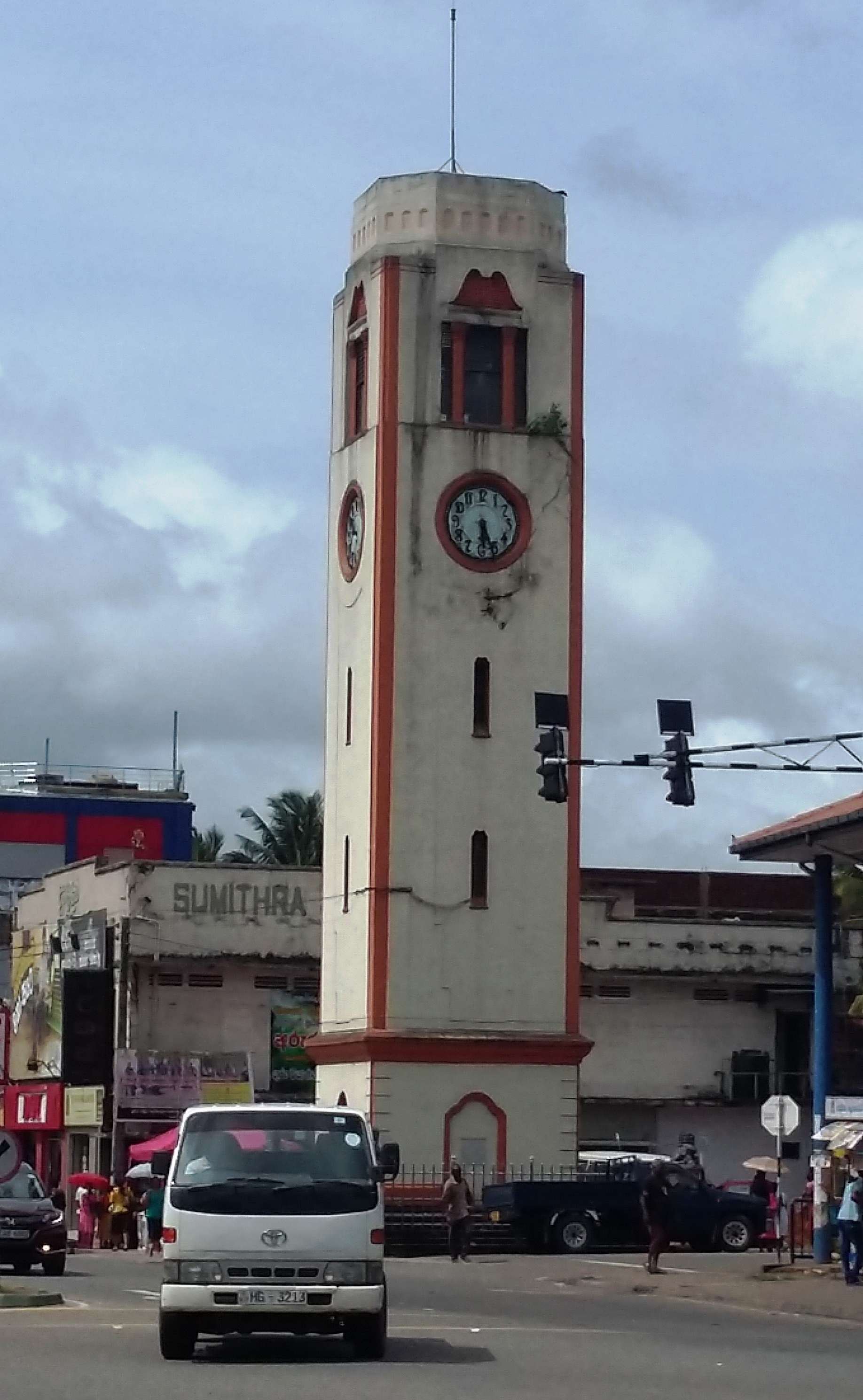
Piliyandala Clock Tower

== Education ==
Piliyandala Central College, the first national sports school established in Sri Lanka is situated in this suburb. It is one of the first central colleges founded by Hon. C. W. W. Kannangara and has about 5,000 students. The school provides facilities for sports such as Rugby, Carrom, Cricket, Football, Girls' Football, Chess, Wushu, Badminton, Karate, Swimming, Athletics, Basketball, Volleyball and Netball. Other popular schools in the area include:

Primary Schools	Secondary Schools	Private Schools (International)
Piliyandala No: 1 Kanishta Vidyalaya	Mampe Dharmaraja Maha Vidyalaya	Negombo South International School
Somaweera Chandrasiri Vidyalaya	Sir John Kotelawela Maha Vidyalaya	Guidance International School
Mampe Junior School	Madapaatha Philip Artygalle Maha Vidyalaya	Leeds International School
Deltara Kanishta Vidyalaya	Kesbewa Dharmasena Attygalle Balika Vidyalaya	Linfield International School
Makuluduwa Kanishta Vidyalaya	Wewala Ananda Samarakoon Vidyalaya	
Makuluduwa Kanishta Vidyalaya		
Hedigama Sri Sudarshana Kanishta Vidyalaya		

== Health ==
Divisional Hospital - Piliyandala (which was established as a Maternity Home in 1939) is a type-B divisional hospital belongs to Ministry of Health and Indigenous Medicine, Sri Lanka. Currently the hospital offers dental clinic, family health clinic, medical clinic, mental health clinic, ante natal clinic, baby clinic, well women clinic, family planning clinics, skin clinic, Direct Observation Treatment (DOT) for TB unit and laboratory services.

== Religion ==
- St. Luke's Church, Piliyandala

== Public Transport ==
Local routes which operate through Piliyandala town.

- 120 - Horana/Kesbewa - Colombo
- 120/285 - Bulathsinhala - Colombo
- 120/458 - Matugama/Neboda - Colombo (via Horana and Anguruwathota)
- 162 - Bandaragama - Colombo
- 162/3 - Atalugama - Colombo (via Bandaragama)
- 139 - Kahathuduwa - Kalubowila
- 255 - Mt. Lavinia - Kottawa

Local bus routes which terminate at Piliyandala town.

- 116 - Mattakkuliya (via Colombo Fort)
- 120 - Pettah
- 127 - Moragahahena (via Gonapola and Olaboduwa Junction)
- 139/1 - Kalubowila
- 139/3 - Korala Ima (via Kahathuduwa)
- 149 - Bandaragama (via Weediyagoda)
- 149/1 - Diyakada
- 149/2 - Homagama (via Diyagama)
- 157 - Kahapola
- 157/1 - Makandana
- 157/2 - Gedabuwana
- 158 - Moratuwa
- 159 - Palagama (via Polgasowita)
- 162/1 - Bandaragama
- 162/2 - Ambalangoda (Western Province)
- 162/3 - Jambureliya (via Kesbewa, Batuwandara, Wewa Ihala Road)
- 162/4 - Karadiyana (via Devananda Road)
- 295 - Dampe (via Suwarapola)
- 295/1 - Hedigama
- 296 - Kottawa (via Gorakapitiya)
- 341 - Maharagama
- 341/2 - Maharagama (via Karadiyana, Thumbowila, Bokundara & Erawwala)
- 342 - Kottawa (via Polgasowita)
- 795 - Gonamadittha
- 866 - Kirigampamunuwa (via Polgasowita)

Long distance bus routes which operate through Piliyandala town.

- 17/255 - Panadura - Kandy (via Kottawa, Athurugiriya, Malabe, Kaduwela, Weliweriya and Pasyala)
- 255/120 A/C - Kadawatha - Moratuwa (via Southern Expressway)
- EX1-26 - Matara (via Southern Expressway)
- 02/425 - Dickwella/Matara - Maharagama (via Boralesgamuwa, Kesbewa, Bandaragama and Kaluthara)
