= Nelukkulam =

Nelukkulam நெளுக்குளம் නෙළුකුලම්
- Suburb
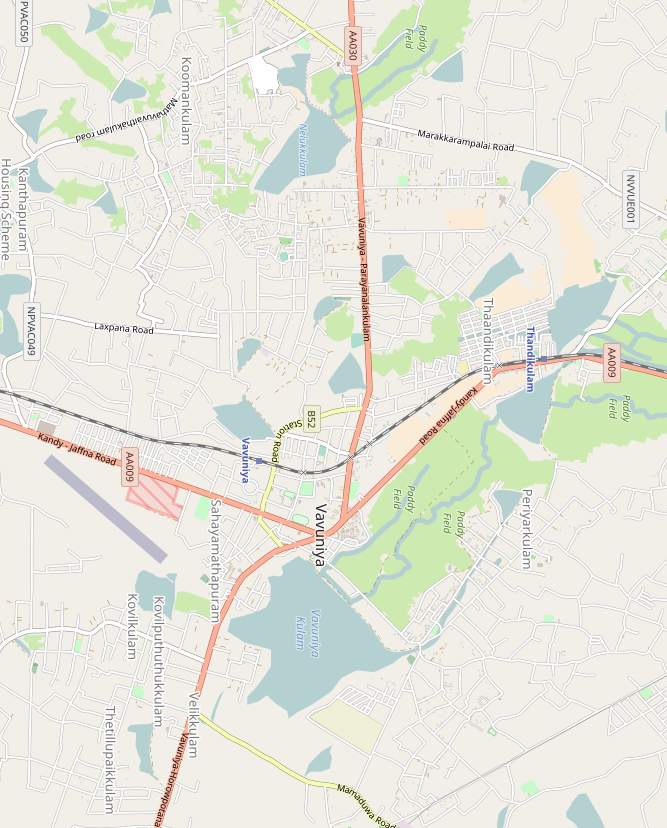
- Location within Greater Vavuniya Location within Northern Province Location within Sri Lanka
- Coordinates: 8°45′29.70″N 80°27′25.70″E
- Country: Sri Lanka
- Province: Northern Province, Sri Lanka
- District: Vavuniya
- Urban Council: Vavuniya Urban Council
- Weather
- Named for: Lotus

Government
  - Type: Urban Council
  - Body: Grama Niladhari
- Elevation: 104 m (341 ft)

Population
  - Total: 5,000
- Time zone: UTC+5:30 (Sri Lanka Standard Time Zone)
- Postal Code: 43000
- Area code: 024

Nelukulam or Nelukkulam or Nellukkulam (official designation 218), (Tamil: நெளுக்குளம், romanized: Neḷukkuḷam; Sinhala: නෙළුකුලම්, romanized: neḷukulam) is a suburb of Vavuniya in northern Sri Lanka. Nelukkulam is located 5.1 km (3.17 mi) away from the centre of Vavuniya.

== Etymology ==
Nelu means lotus in Sinhala and the village is also known as Nelukkulam based on the lotus pond there.

== Location ==
Nelukkulam is located 1 km (0.62 mi) away from Vanuniya. It is bordered to the north by Poovarasankulam, to the east by Vannansinnakkulam, to the west by Kurukkal Puthukkulam, and to the south by Cheddikulam.

== Education ==
Nelukkulam Kalaimagal Maha Vidyalayam
