= Thonikkal =

Thonikkal தோணிக்கல் තෝනිකල්
- Suburb
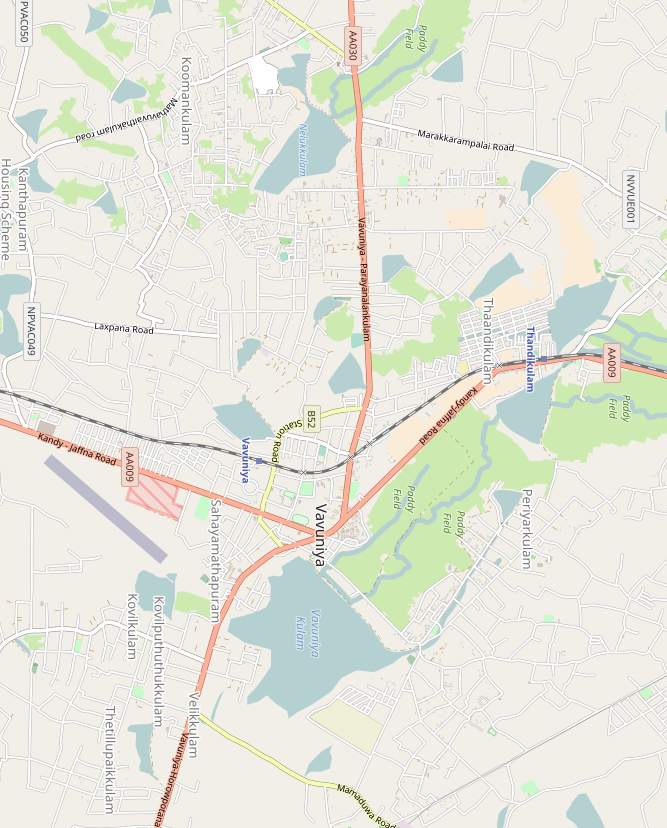
- Location within Greater Vavuniya Location within Northern Province Location within Sri Lanka
- Coordinates: 8°46′34″N 80°27′28″E
- Country: Sri Lanka
- Province: Northern Province, Sri Lanka
- District: Vavuniya
- Pradeshiya Sabha Urban Council: Vavuniya South Tamil Pradeshiya Sabha; Vavuniya Urban Council
- Weather
- Named for: Thoni

Government
  - Type: Pradeshiya Sabha
  - Body: Grama Niladhari

Area
  - Total: 23.6 km^{2} (9.1 sq mi)
- Elevation: 104 m (341 ft)

Population
  - Total: 10,000 (approx.)
  - Density: 420/km^{2} (1,100/sq mi)
- Time zone: UTC+5:30 (Sri Lanka Standard Time Zone)
- Postal Code: 43000
- Area code: 024

Thonikkal or Thonikal (Official Name 214F), (Tamil: தோணிக்கல், romanized: Tōṇikkal; Sinhala: තෝනිකල්, romanized: tōnikal) is a suburb and is considered to be one of the largest village by area in Vavuniya. It is the second most populated area in Vavuniya after Koomankulam. Administered by Vavuniya South Tamil Pradeshiya Sabha and Vavuniya Urban Councildue to its large area.

== Etymology ==
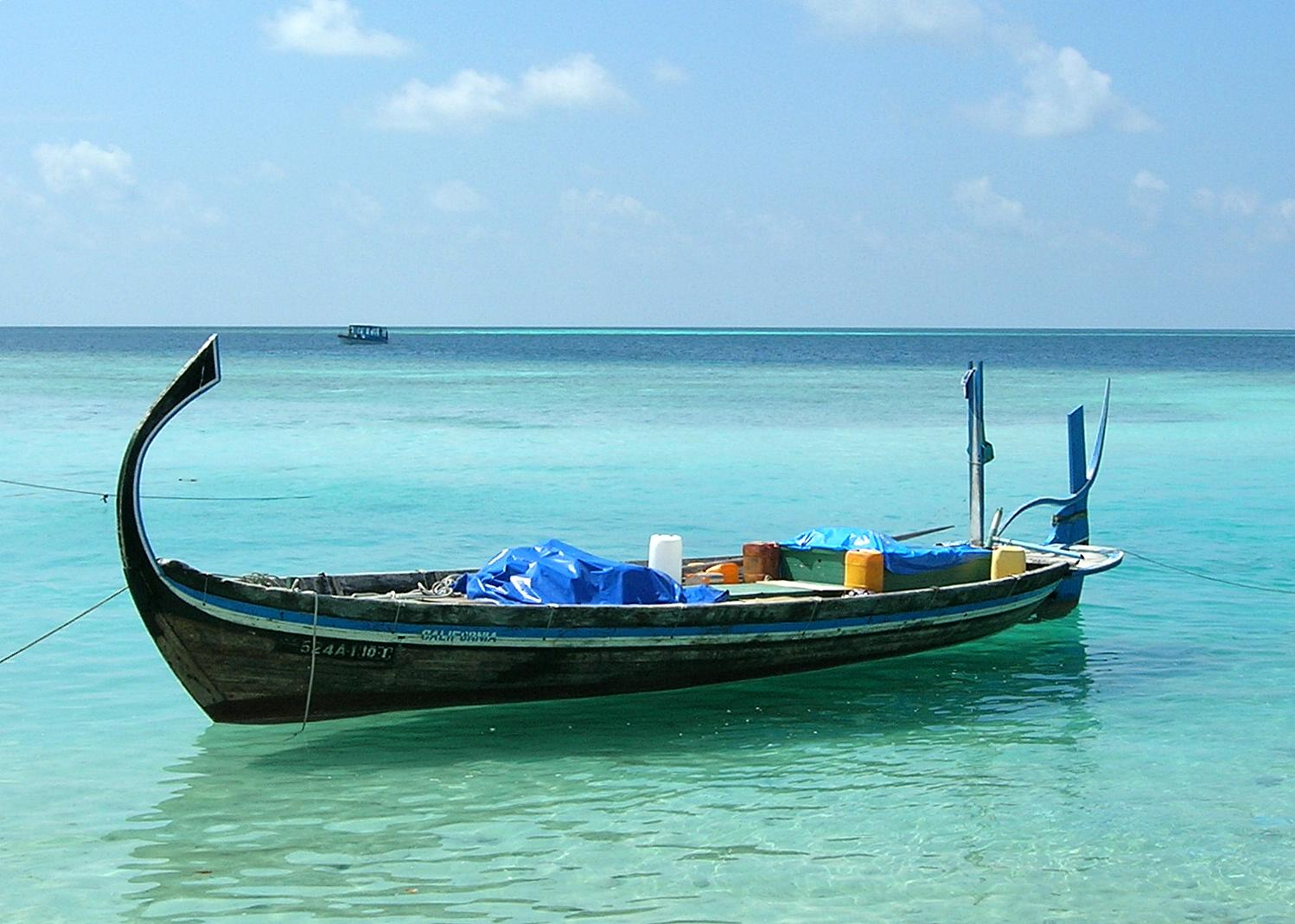
The depiction of Thoni that gave rise to the name Thonikkal

Some of the Indian Tamils who lived under the Madras Presidency during the British rule in India came to Sri Lanka in Dhoni, Stealthily. Initially known as Kalla Thoni, the town later came to be known as Thonikkal.

== Location ==
Thonikkal is located 2.6 km (1.6 mi) away from Vavuniya. It is bordered to the north by Vavuniya, to the east by Kovilkulam, to the west by Kanthapuram and to the south by Moonrumurippu.
