= Kesbewa Urban Council =

Local authority in Sri Lanka

Kesbewa Urban Council: කැස්බෑව නගර සභාව (Sinhala); கெஸ்பேவா நகர சபை (Tamil)

Type
- Type: Local Authority

History
- Founded: 1988; 37 years ago

Leadership
- Chairman: Madduma Kaluge Chamara, (NPP) since (6 May 2025)
- Vice Chairman: Manodya Priyadarshani Galpaayage, (NPP) since (6 May 2025)

Structure
- Seats: 34
- Political groups: Government: NPP (20); Opposition: SJB (5); SLPP (3); Independents (2); UNP (1); SB (1); PA (1); NFF (1)

Elections
- Last election: 6 May 2025
- Next election: TBW

Website
- Kesbewa Urban Council

Kesbewa Urban Council (Sinhala: කැස්බෑව නගර සභාව, Tamil: கெஸ்பேவா நகர சபை) is the local authority for the city of Kesbewa and surrounding suburbs in Sri Lanka.

The vision of the council as stated on their website is:

To provide health services, roads, public utilities and welfare services by efficiently and effectively utilising the human and physical resources of the Municipal Council to promote the well-being and quality of life of the people in the Kesbewa Municipal Council area.

== History ==
In 1987, a new local government system called Pradeshiya Sabha was introduced. The jurisdiction of a Pradeshiya Sabha was mostly confined to a Divisional Secretariat, and accordingly the Kesbewa Pradeshiya Sabha was incorporated with effect from 1 January 1988. The Pradeshiya Sabha functioned in accordance with the provisions of the Pradeshiya Sabha Act No. 15 of 1987.

With the rapid urbanisation of the Kesbewa area, the Kesbewa Urban Council and the Boralesgamuwa Urban Council were incorporated as two Local Government Institutions with effect from 15 April 2006 through a Special Gazette Notification No. 1426/15 dated 4 January 2006.

== Geography ==
Kesbewa Urban Council is situated in Colombo District, south east of the city of Colombo. It is about 41 km^{2} (16 sq mi) in extent.

The council area is bounded on the north by the Colombo-Avissawella main road (A4) and the Maharagama Urban Council boundary. It is bounded on the east by Polgasowita - Kottawa main road and Homagama Pradeshiya Sabha boundary. It is bounded on the south by the Bolgoda Lake. It is bordered to the west by the Dehiwala-Mount Lavinia Municipal Council and Boralesgamuwa Urban Council.

=== Grama Niladhari Divisions ===
The council comprises 55 Grama Niladhari Divisions.

== Demographics ==
In 2018, the council had a population of 192,630, with 141,065 registered voters and 49,478 households.
