= 1985 Vavuniya massacre =

Sri Lankan Army murder of Tamil civilians

- Location of Vavuniya district in Sri Lanka
- Location: Vavuniya District, Sri Lanka
- Date: 16–18 August 1985
- Target: Tamil civilians
- Attack type: Massacre
- Weapon: Guns
- Deaths: 200+
- Perpetrator: Sri Lankan Army

The 1985 Vavuniya massacre refers to the mass murder of over 200 Tamil civilians in the Vavuniya District of northern Sri Lanka by the Sri Lankan Army between 16 and 18 August 1985 during the first phase of the Sri Lankan civil war. The massacre led to the collapse of the second phase of the peace talks between the Sri Lankan government and the Tamil delegation held at Thimphu. It was described as among the "worst anti-Tamil pogroms".

== Background ==
A ceasefire between the Tamil militants and the Sri Lankan government had been in place since June 1985 which was largely observed in the Tamil-dominated Jaffna peninsula, the government's weakest front. However, in other ethnically diverse areas of the contested Tamil Eelam, violence continued. Starting from August 1985, there was an upsurge of violence against the Tamil population of Vavuniya and Trincomalee districts by the Sri Lankan security forces and the Home Guards as part of a plan to drive the Tamils out of these strategically important areas in order to create a military buffer zone with Sinhalese settlements. These attacks led to the displacement of tens of thousands of Tamil civilians, most of whom fled to the relative safety of Jaffna where they ended up in refugee camps.

== Massacre ==
On 16 August 1985, at about 5am, a landmine exploded on the outskirts of the Vavuniya town, causing a minor damage to a culvert but no one was injured nor killed. Although the Tamil militants were suspected of having detonated the landmine targeting security personnel, it was reported based on eyewitness accounts that the incident was staged by the Sri Lankan Army itself in order to use it as an excuse to drive the Tamils out of Vavuniya. An official spokesman for the Eelam National Liberation Front (ENLF) consisting of the LTTE, TELO, EROS and EPRLF also denied any responsibility for the explosion. It was further reported that on the previous morning the Sinhalese residents of Thonikkal had been moved to Navagama close to the Eratperiyakulam Army Camp.

Soon after the explosion, the Sri Lanka Army soldiers went on a rampage, shooting at Tamil civilians and burning down houses and shops until about 8:30am. The house of Kathiramalai, the local head of the Sarvodaya voluntary organisation, was the first to be targeted for attack and his family members were shot dead. About fifty Tamils who had sought refuge in the house of C. Suntharalingam were ordered out and lined up under a tree; when the soldiers who stood guard over them opened fire, they fled but many were mowed down by bullets.

The soldiers surrounded the Vavuniya Hospital till about 1:30pm, shooting, burning down the staff quarters and threatening the doctors in order to prevent the injured from getting treatment. About twenty houses near the hospital were burned down by the police. Over 1,000 Tamil families took refuge in the St. Anthony's Church. Survivors witnessed soldiers and the police chief returning to collect dead bodies and two trailers filled with corpses being driven toward the army camp. Sinhalese civilians joined the soldiers in looting Tamil properties near the army camp.

In the night, the farming villages of Irampaikulam, Thonikkal, Koolaipillaiyar Kulam, Koodamankulam and Moonrumurippu were cordoned off by about 400 soldiers and the huts were searched, during which some of the youths were shot dead before their families. A senior army officer ordered everyone below the age of 40 to stand in a line and over 50 youths who did so were shot dead. The killings continued for the next two days. The following afternoon two bound corpses of Tamils who had been shot dead that morning by the army were delivered during a funeral service for a Tamil mother and her teenage daughter who had been killed the previous day.

Many Tamil residents along Vavuniya-Kandy road were reported missing. About six refugee camps were set up for the displaced. Hundreds of Tamils were at the railway station scrambling to get out of the town. The streets were deserted, stores closed and Vavuniya took on the appearance of a "ghost town". An inquest held by the Vavuniya Magistrate into the death of 21 victims included 10 children. In total, over 200 Tamil civilians were estimated to have been killed in the massacre spanning three days.

== Aftermath ==
When the news of the massacre reached the Tamil delegation engaged in the second phase of the peace talks with the Sri Lankan government held at Thimphu, many of them broke down and wept. The peace talks collapsed when the Tamil delegation consisting of the TULF and the Tamil militant groups LTTE, EROS, TELO, EPRLF and PLOTE decided to walk out in protest. The Tamil delegation issued the following statement:

As we have talked here in Thimphu the genocidal intent of the Sri Lankan state has manifested itself in the continued killings of Tamils in their homeland. In the most recent incidents which have occurred during the past few days more than 200 innocent Tamil civilians, including young children—whose only crime is that they are Tamils—have been killed by the Sri Lanka armed forces running amok in Vavuniya and elsewhere. These events are proof of the intention of the Sri Lanka government to seek a military solution to the Tamil national question. It is farcical to continue peace talks at Thimphu when there is no peace and no security for the Tamil people in their homelands. We do not seek to terminate the talks at Thimphu but our participation in peace talks has been now rendered impossible by the conduct of the Sri Lankan state which has acted in violation of the cease-fire agreements which constitute the fundamental basis for Thimphu talks.

The LTTE leader Prabhakaran was angered by the massacres in Vavuniya and Trincomalee which he had predicted in the previous year and later stated that they were worse than even the Black July pogrom. The ENLF militant groups vowed to launch "a joint military campaign" against the Sri Lanka Army as a retaliation for these massacres.

== See also ==
- List of attacks on civilians attributed to Sri Lankan government forces
- Role of the Sri Lankan Home Guards in the Sri Lankan Civil War
