= Koomankulam =

koomankulam கூமாங்குளம் කුමාංකුලම්
- Suburb
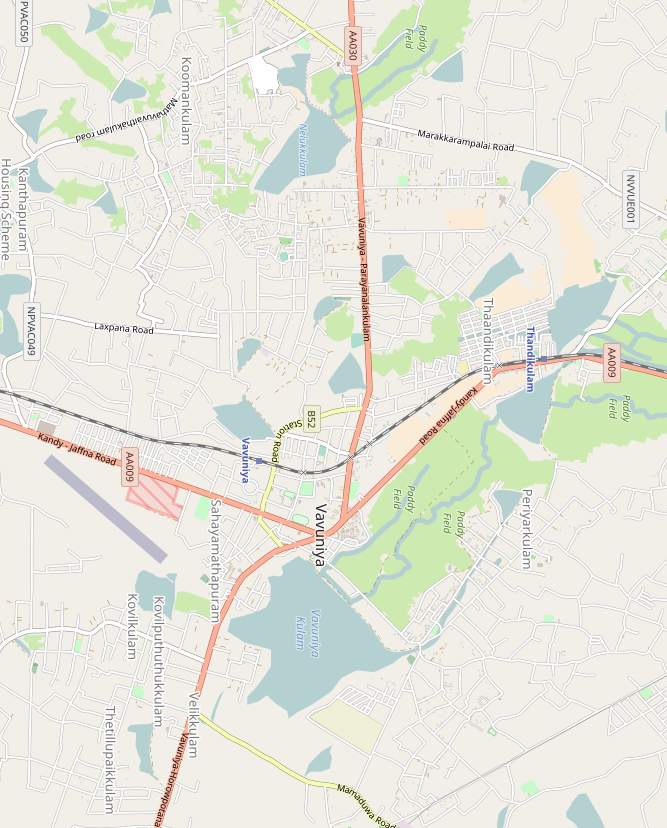
- Location within Greater Vavuniya Location within Northern Province Location within Sri Lanka
- Coordinates: 8°46′34″N 80°27′28″E
- Country: Sri Lanka
- Province: Northern Province, Sri Lanka
- District: Vavuniya
- Pradeshiya Sabha: Vavuniya South Tamil Pradeshiya Sabha
- Weather
- Named for: Kūmā Tree

Government
  - Type: Pradeshiya Sabha
  - Body: Grama Niladhari

Area
  - Total: 31.3 km^{2} (12.1 sq mi)
- Elevation: 104 m (341 ft)

Population
  - Total: ~15,000
- Time zone: UTC+5:30 (Sri Lanka Standard Time Zone)
- Postal Code: 43000
- Area code: 024

Koomankulam (Vavuniya-04 or Official Name 214F), (Tamil: கூமாங்குளம், romanized: Kūmāṅkuḷam; Sinhala: කුමාංකුලම්, romanized: kumāṁkulam) is a suburb and is considered to be the largest village in Sri Lanka. It is the most populated area in Vavuniya. Administered by Vavuniya South Tamil Pradeshiya Sabha.

== Etymology ==
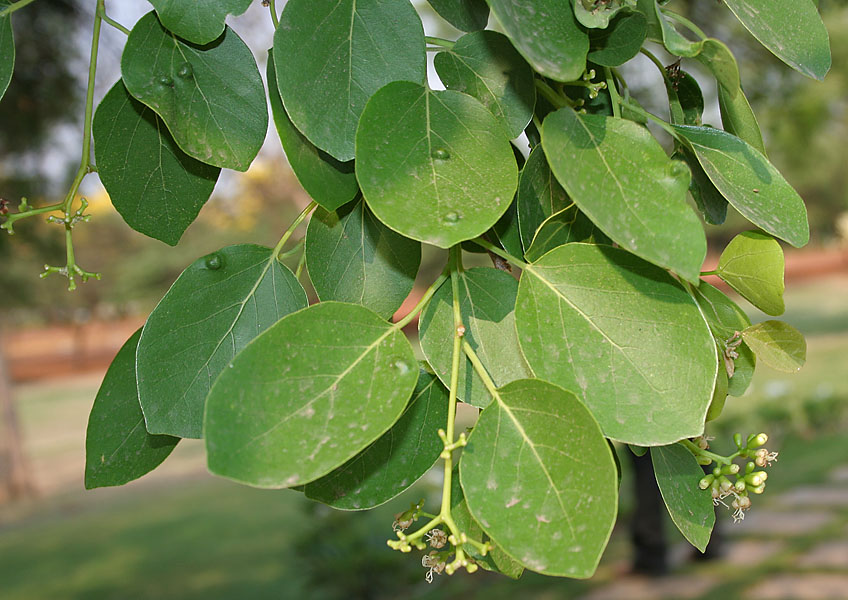
The Kūmā tree that gave rise to the name Koomankulam

The village came to be known as Koomankulam due to the abundance of Kūmā trees in the area.

== Location ==
Koomankulam is located 5.4 km (4.6 mi) away from Vanuniya. It is bordered to the north by Nelukulam, to the east by Ukkulankulam, to the west by Rasenthirakulam, and to the south by Thavasikulam

== Education ==
Koomankulam Sithivinaygar Vidyalayam
