= Nampamunuwa =

- Village
- Location within Sri Lanka
- Coordinates: 6°48′0″N 79°57′0″E
- Country: Sri Lanka
- Province: Western Province
- Time zone: UTC+5:30 (Sri Lanka Standard Time Zone)
  - Summer (DST): UTC+6

Nampamunuwa is a village in the Western Province in Sri Lanka. The nearest town, Piliyandala, is 3.4 km away.
