= Urban councils of Sri Lanka =

Administrative division in Sri Lanka

There are 41 Urban councils in Sri Lanka, which are the legislative bodies that preside over the second tier municipalities in the country. Introduced in 1987 through the 13th Amendment to the Constitution of Sri Lanka, Urban councils became a devolved subject under the Provincial Councils in the Local Government system of Sri Lanka. The Urban councils collectively govern approximately 1,388,000 people. There are 417 Councillors in total, ranging from 22 to 7 per council.

== Urban councils ==
=== Current ===
United National Party Illankai Tamil Arasu Kachchi National People's Power (NPP) Independent Sri Lanka Podujana Peramuna Samagi Jana Balawegaya Democratic Tamil National Alliance

Province	District		Urban council		Municipality	Established/ Elevated	No. of Councillors	Chairman	Area (km^{2})	Population (2024)	Website
Western	1	Colombo	1	Kolonnawa	Kolonnawa	1930	19 (▼1)	(List)		43,470	
Western	1	Colombo	2	Seethawakapura	Seethawakapura		25	(List)		113,257	seethawakapura.uc.gov.lk
Western	1	Colombo	3	Maharagama	Maharagama	1963	43 (▲21)	(List)		144,675	maharagama.uc.gov.lk
Western	1	Colombo	4	Boralesgamuwa	Boralesgamuwa	2006	17 (▲8)	(List)		40,678	
Western	1	Colombo	5	Kesbewa	Kesbewa	1988	34 (▼1)	(List)		154,494	kesbewa.uc.gov.lk
Western	2	Gampaha	6	Wattala-Mabola	Wattala-Mabola		16	(List)		21,374	
Western	2	Gampaha	7	Peliyagoda	Peliyagoda		17	(List)		17,983	
Western	2	Gampaha	8	Katunayake-Seeduwa	Katunayake-Seeduwa		19	(List)		30,890	
Western	2	Gampaha	9	Minuwangoda	Minuwangoda		17 (▲6)	(List)		6,256	
Western	2	Gampaha	10	Ja-Ela	Ja-Ela	1942	17 (▼1)	(List)		141,170	
Western	3	Kalutara	11	Panadura	Panadura	1923	18 (▲1)	(List)		23,841	
Western	3	Kalutara	12	Horana	Horana		13 (▲4)	(List)		139,731	
Western	3	Kalutara	13	Kalutara	Kalutara	1923	31 (▲11)	(List)		56,280	
Western	3	Kalutara	14	Beruwala	Beruwala		16	(List)		30,394	
North Western	4	Kurunegala	15	Kuliyapitiya	Kuliyapitiya		16	(List)		4,049	
North Western	5	Puttalam	16	Puttalam	Puttalam		19	(List)		36,523	puttalamuc.com
North Western	5	Puttalam	17	Chilaw	Chilaw		20 (▲2)	(List)		18,488	
Central	6	Kandy	18	Wattegama	Wattegama		16	(List)		6,977	
Central	6	Kandy	19	Kadugannawa	Kadugannawa		15 (▲4)	(List)		10,894	
Central	6	Kandy	20	Gampola	Gampola		29	(List)		34,028	
Central	6	Kandy	21	Nawalapitiya	Nawalapitiya		15 (▼1)	(List)		10,391	
Central	7	Nuwara Eliya	22	Hatton-Dickoya	Hatton-Dickoya		15 (▼1)	(List)		11,108	
Central	7	Nuwara Eliya	23	Talawakele-Lindula	Talawakele-Lindula	1948	12 (▼3)	(List)		4,319	talawakelle-lindula.uc.gov.lk
Uva	8	Badulla	24	Haputale	Haputale		11	(List)		3,051	
Southern	9	Galle	25	Ambalangoda	Ambalangoda		22 (▲1)	(List)	20	18,804	ambalangoda.uc.gov.lk
Southern	9	Galle	26	Hikkaduwa	Hikkaduwa		19 (▲8)	(List)		23,107	
Southern	10	Matara	27	Weligama	Weligama		10 (▲8)	(SJB)		17,769	
Southern	11	Hambantota	28	Tangalle	Tangalle		19	(List)		7,105	
Sabaragamuwa	12	Ratnapura	29	Balangoda	Balangoda		16	(List)		17,455	balangoda.uc.gov.lk
Sabaragamuwa	12	Ratnapura	30	Embilipitiya	Embilipitiya	200	14	(List)		32,567	embilipitiya.uc.gov.lk
Sabaragamuwa	13	Kegalle	31	Kegalle	Kegalle		21 (▲3)	(List)		14,561	
Northern	14	Jaffna	32	Point Pedro	Point Pedro		15 (▲6)	(List)		8,792	
Northern	14	Jaffna	33	Valvettithurai	Valvettithurai		16 (▼1)	(List)		7,041	
Northern	14	Jaffna	34	Chavakachcheri	Chavakachcheri		18 (▲7)	(List)		13,996	
Northern	15	Mannar	35	Mannar	Mannar	2006	16 (▲2)	(List)		16,196	
Northern	16	Vavuniya	36	Vavuniya	Vavuniya		21 (▲3)	(List)		20,609	
Eastern	17	Batticaloa	37	Kattankudi	Kattankudi		18 (▲9)	(List)		34,686	kattankudy.uc.gov.lk
Eastern	17	Batticaloa	38	Eravur	Eravur	2011	17 (▲8)	(List)		20,561	
Eastern	18	Ampara	39	Ampara	Ampara		17 (▲1)	(List)		17,811	
Eastern	19	Trincomalee	40	Trincomalee	Trincomalee	1940	25	(List)		38,338	
Eastern	19	Trincomalee	41	Kinniya	Kinniya	2006	15	(List)		36,772	

Municipal councils by party
1. National People's Power (56.1%)
2. Sri Lanka Muslim Congress (4.87%)
3. Samagi Jana Balawegaya (14.6%)
4. Ilankai Tamil Arasu Kachchi (4.87%)
5. Independent (7.31%)
6. Democratic Tamil National Alliance (2.43%)
7. All Ceylon Tamil Congress (7.31%)
8. Ceylon workers congress (2.43%)

=== Former ===
Elevated to Municipal council status in 1959

- Dehiwala-Mount Lavinia Urban Council

Elevated to Municipal council status in 1997

- Moratuwa Urban Council
- Sri Jayawardenapura Kotte Urban Council

Elevated to Municipal council status in 2011

- Bandarawela Urban Council
- Hambantota Urban Council

== See also ==
- List of cities in Sri Lanka
- Provincial government in Sri Lanka
