= Bandaragama =

Suburb in Kalutara District, Western Province, Sri Lanka

Bandaragama බණ්ඩාරගම பண்டாரகம
- Suburb
- Location in Sri Lanka
- Coordinates: 6°42′53″N 79°59′21″E
- Country: Sri Lanka
- Province: Western Province
- District: Kalutara District
- DS Division: Bandaragama

Government
  - Type: Pradeshiya Sabha
  - Body: Bandaragama Pradeshiya Sabha

Area
  - Total: 56.50 km^{2} (21.81 sq mi)

Population (2024 Census)
  - Total: 124,133
  - Density: 2,197/km^{2} (5,690/sq mi)
- Time zone: UTC+5:30 (SLST)

Bandaragama (Sinhala: බණ්ඩාරගම, Tamil: பண்டாரகம) is a suburb and town in the Kalutara District, Western Province, Sri Lanka. Located approximately 30 km (19 mi) south-east of Colombo, it serves as a residential, commercial, and transit hub linking the coastal belt with the interior towns of the Kalutara and Colombo districts.

== Administration and demographics ==
Bandaragama serves as the administrative center for the Bandaragama Divisional Secretariat in the Kalutara District. According to the 2024 Sri Lankan Census, the Bandaragama Divisional Secretariat division recorded a population of 124,133 across a land area of 56.50 km^{2} (21.81 sq mi). Local municipal governance is overseen by the Bandaragama Pradeshiya Sabha.

== Geography ==
Bandaragama is situated in the lowland wet zone of Sri Lanka. Its surrounding landscape consists of low-lying alluvial plains, wetlands, and agricultural land associated with the Bolgoda Lake system to the west and north-west.

== Economy ==
Traditionally an agrarian area characterized by wet-rice paddy fields, rubber estates, and coconut cultivation, Bandaragama has developed into a commuter and commercial suburb due to its proximity to Colombo and major highway networks.

== Transport ==
Bandaragama is a major road junction in the Western Province:

- Southern Expressway (E01): The Gelanigama Interchange connects Bandaragama directly to Sri Lanka's expressway network, providing high-speed access north toward Colombo and south toward Galle and Matara.
- A8 Highway (Panadura–Ratnapura Road): Runs directly through Bandaragama, linking the coastal town of Panadura in the west with Horana, Ingiriya, and Ratnapura in the east.
- Regional B-grade roads: Connected to neighboring towns via routes including the B254 (Kesbewa–Kindelpitiya–Bandaragama Road) and B458 (Waskaduwa–Bandaragama Road).

== Education ==
Bandaragama falls under the Horana Educational Zone and the Bandaragama Educational Division. Notable schools in the division include Bandaragama Central College (Bandaragama Maha Vidyalaya), Pathahawatta Shri Swarnajothy Maha Vidyalaya, and Algassalie Muslim Primary School.

== Sports and recreation ==
Bandaragama is home to the Sri Lanka Karting Circuit (SpeedBay Bandaragama), an FIA-CIK homologated international-standard karting track measuring approximately 1.2 km (0.75 mi) that hosts national motorsport and karting events.
