= St. Luke's Church, Piliyandala =

St Luke’s Church, Piliyandala
- Location: Old Kesbawa Road, Piliyandala, Sri Lanka
- Denomination: Anglican (Church of Ceylon)
- Website: dioceseofcolombo.lk

Architecture
- Functional status: Active
- Architectural type: Church
- Completed: 1896

Administration
- Diocese: Diocese of Colombo
- Archdeaconry: Galle Archdeaconry

Clergy
- Vicar: S. L. W. Pathmasiri

St. Luke's Church, Mampe, Piliyandala, is a Christian (Anglican) church located at the centre of Piliyandala, a suburb of Colombo, Sri Lanka. The church's first priest was the Rev. R. T. Dowbiggin (from 1896 to 1902).

Mampe Primary School is also situated at the same location. The school was the property of the Church Missionary Society (CMS). In 1962, with the government takeover of church schools, the mission house was also taken together with much of the land that belonged to the church.
