= Kurumankadu =

- Town
- Location within Northern Province
- Coordinates: 8°45′0″N 80°29′0″E
- Country: Sri Lanka
- Province: Northern Province
- District: Vavuniya

Population
  - Total: 2.455
- Time zone: UTC+5:30 (Sri Lanka Standard Time)

Kurumankadu or Vavuniya 01 is a town in Vavuniya District, Sri Lanka. It is the second-largest town in the district after Vavuniya. It is situated in the Jaffna, Mannar Junction at Vavuniya.

== Location ==
Kurumankadu is located 1.5 km (0.93 mi) away from Vanniyar. Its boundaries are to the north is Thandikkulam, to the east Kuddiyiruppu, the west Padanichipuliyankulam, and to the south Pandarikulam.

== History ==
Settlements in Kurumankadu expanded significantly in the late 20th century. Previously a forested area until the 19th century, the population grew as people displaced by the Sri Lankan Civil War, particularly from Jaffna, sought refuge and settled in the area.
