= Vipulanantha College =

- விபுலாநந்தா கல்லூரி

Location
- 113 School Road; Vavuniya, Vavuniya District, Northern Province, 43000; Sri Lanka
- Coordinates: 8°45′25.50″N 80°28′58.20″E

Information
- School type: Public provincial 1AB
- School district: Vavuniya South Education Zone
- Authority: Northern Provincial Council
- School number: 1302006
- Principal: Mrs Gnanamathi
- Teaching staff: 100
- Grades: 1-13
- Gender: Mixed
- Age range: 5-18

Vipulanantha College (Tamil: விபுலாநந்தா கல்லூரி Vipulānantā Kallūri) is a provincial school in Vavuniya, Sri Lanka.

== See also ==
- List of schools in Northern Province, Sri Lanka
