= Boralesgamuwa Urban Council =

Boralesgamuwa Urban Council: බොරලැස්ගමුව නගර සභාව (Sinhala); போரலெஸ்கமுவ நகர சபை (Tamil)

Type
- Type: Local Authority

History
- Founded: 2006; 19 years ago

Leadership
- Chairman: Pradeep Nishantha, (NPP) since (6 May 2025)
- Vice Chairman: Dhammika Sriyananda Gamlath, (NPP) since (6 May 2025)

Structure
- Seats: 17
- Political groups: Government (10): NPP (10); Opposition (7): SJB (2); UNP (1); SLPP (1); SB (1); PA (1); Independents (1)

Elections
- Last election: 6 May 2025
- Next election: TBD

Boralesgamuwa Urban Council (Sinhala: බොරලැස්ගමුව නගර සභාව, Tamil: போரலெஸ்கமுவ நகர சபை) is the local authority for Boralesgamuwa and surrounding suburbs in Sri Lanka.

== History ==
Previously a part of the Kesbewa Pradeshiya Sabha, the Boralesgamuwa Urban Council was incorporated as a separate local government institution with effect from 15 April 2006 through a Special Gazette Notification No. 1426/15 dated 4 January 2006.

== Geography ==
=== Wards ===
For electoral and administrative purposes, the council is divided into 10 wards:

1. Pepiliyana
2. Divulpitiya
3. Rattanapitiya
4. Boralesgamuwa West
5. Bellanvila
6. Werahera
7. Boralesgamuwa East
8. Bodhirajapura
9. Katuwawala
10. Neelammahara
