= Boralesgamuwa =

City in Sri Lanka

Boralesgamuwa: බොරලැස්ගමුව (Sinhala); பொரலெஸ்கமுவ (Tamil)
- Town
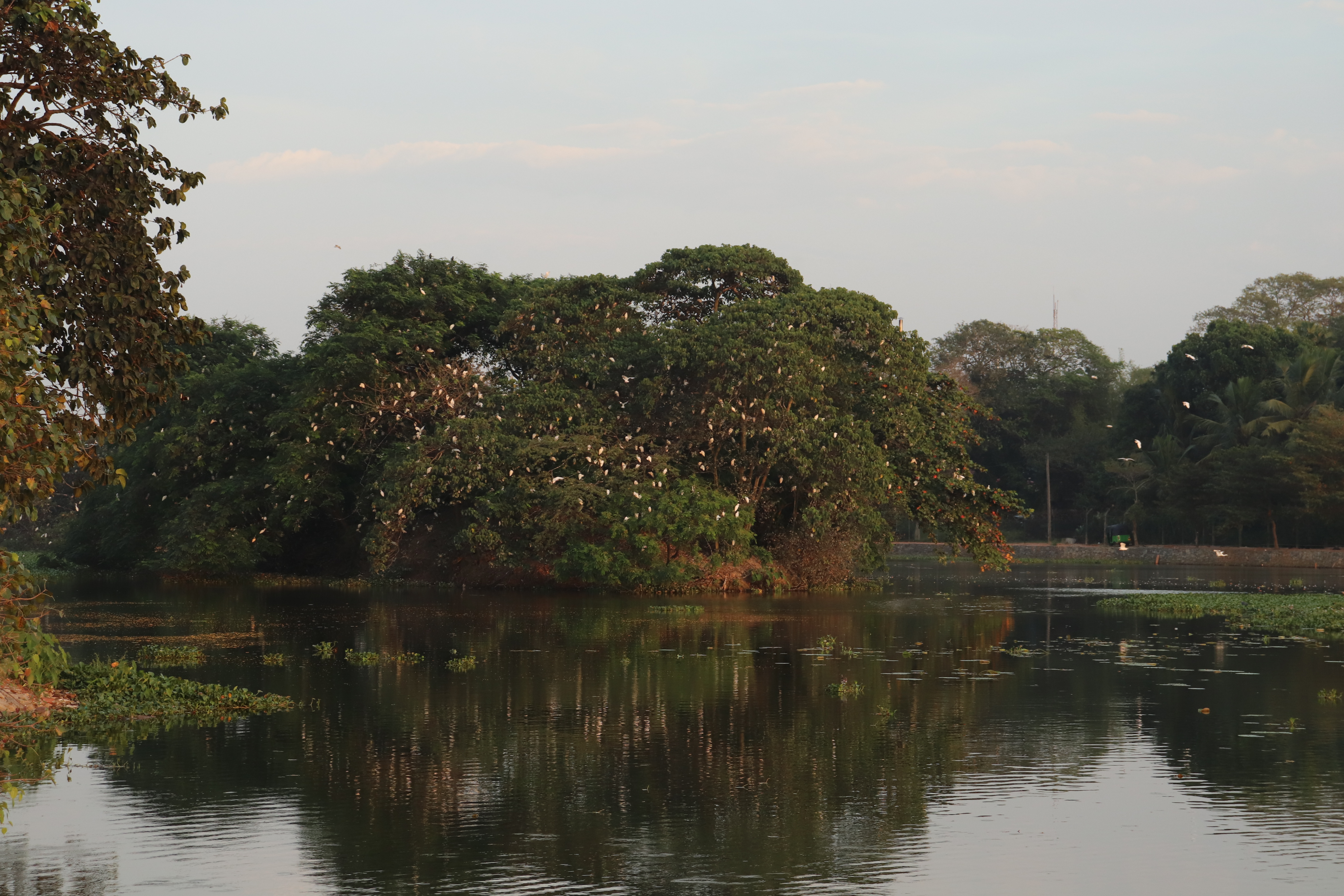
- Boralasgamuwa Lake

- Location within Colombo District
- Coordinates: 6°51′N 79°54′E
- Country: Sri Lanka
- Province: Western Province
- District: Colombo District

Government
  - Type: Boralesgamuwa Urban Council
- Time zone: +5.30
- Postal code: 10290

Boralesgamuwa is a town in Colombo District, Sri Lanka. It is located 14 km (8.7 mi) southeast of Colombo, and forms part of Colombo urban development area. It is administered by the Boralesgamuwa Urban Council. The town has significant kaolin deposits.

== History ==
The Bellanwila Rajamaha Viharaya is situated in Boralesgamuwa. The sacred Bodhi tree at the vihara is believed to be one of the 32 saplings originating from the Jaya Sri Maha Bodhi in Anuradhapura, which was brought to Sri Lanka from India in the third century BCE. The tree was rediscovered around 1850 by a Buddhist monk while traveling by boat along the Katu-ela stream.

The town has significant deposits of kaolin, a clay mineral used in the ceramics industry, identified in the area during the early 1940s. Investigations conducted by the Department of Geological Survey in 1952 established reserves of approximately 725,000 tons of pure kaolin over an area of six acres. A kaolin refinery with a production capacity of 5,000 tons annually was established by the Ceylon Ceramic Corporation in 1962.

== Geography and administration ==
Boralesgamuwa is a town in Colombo District, Western Province, Sri Lanka. It is located 14 km (8.7 mi) southeast of Colombo, along the road connecting Horana with Colombo. The town forms part of larger Colombo urban development area and is administered by the Boralesgamuwa Urban Council.

== Demographics ==
Boralesgamuwa had a population of 59,483 in 2011. According to the 2024 census, the Boralesgamuwa Urban Council area had a population of 59,240 inhabitants, comprising 28,240 males and 31,000 females.
