= Gonapola =

Gonapola ගෝනපොල
- Village
- Interactive map of Gonapola
- Coordinates: 6°45′43.3″N 80°00′52.5″E
- Country: Sri Lanka
- Province: Western Province
- District: Kalutara
- Time zone: UTC+5:30 (Sri Lanka Standard Time)
- Postal Code: 12410

Gonapola is a village in Sri Lanka. It is located within Western Province.

== See also ==
- List of towns in Western Province, Sri Lanka
