= Weras Ganga Park =

Public park in Colombo, Sri Lanka

- Location within Sri Lanka
- Type: Public park
- Location: Bellanwila in Colombo, Sri Lanka
- Coordinates: 6°50′29″N 79°53′38″E
- Status: Open year round

The Weras Ganga Park (also known as Weras Ganga Bellanwila Recreation Park) is a public park located in Bellanwila area, next to the Bellanwila Rajamaha Viharaya in Colombo, Sri Lanka.

== History ==
Weras Ganga Park was opened in 2014 as a part of Weras Ganga Development Project - Bellanwila Section. The construction work of the park was handled by the Sri Lanka Army and the Sri Lanka Navy. The work has been carried out under the guidance of Defense and Urban Development Ministry Secretary Gotabhaya Rajapaksa and this work was initiated by the Sri Lanka Land Reclamation and Development Corporation (SLLR&DC) based on a hydrological study carried out by JICA together with SLLR&DC for the preparation of a Master Plan to control flooding in Nugegoda, Rattanapitiya, Borelasgamuwa, Maha Ela and Ratmalana areas.

== Features ==
The place is all stone tiles with planned patches of green with a seating space and around the seating space there is a neat walkway that goes along the Weras Lake. Food outlets are also available to cater to the needs of the visitors.
