= Bolgoda Lake =

Lake in Sri Lanka

- බොල්ගොඩ වැව (Sinhala); போல்கோடா ஏரி (Tamil)
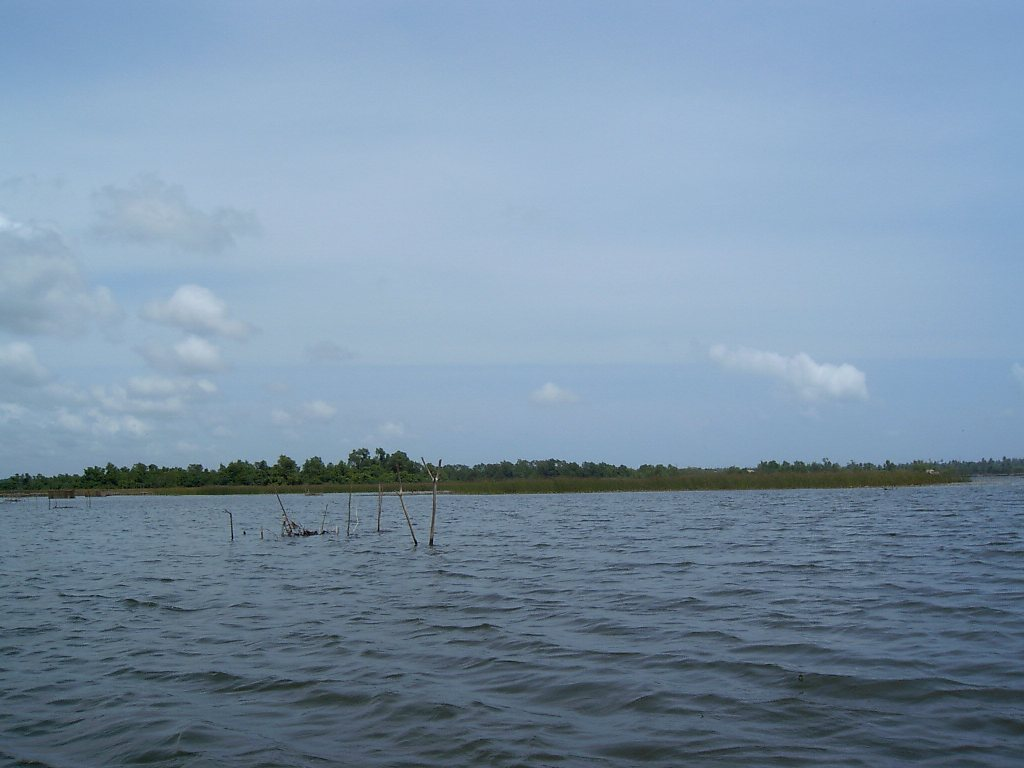
- Bolgoda Lake

- Location of Bolgoda Lake
- Location: Colombo District; Kalutara District
- Coordinates: 6°46′16″N 79°54′27″E
- Basin countries: Sri Lanka
- Surface area: 374 square kilometres (144 sq mi)
- Islands: 13
- Settlements: Panadura

Bolgoda Lake or Bolgoda River (Sinhala: බොල්ගොඩ වැව, Tamil: போல்கோடா ஏரி) is a freshwater lake in the Western Province of Sri Lanka, straddling the border between Colombo District and Kalutara District. It consists of two main bodies of water, a northern portion and a southern portion, connected by a waterway called Bolgoda River. The lake drains into the sea at the estuary in Panadura.

Bolgoda Lake is part of Bolgoda Environmental Protection Area, gazetted in December 2009 and consisting of 5 subdivisions:

1. Bolgoda Ganga
2. Bolgoda North Lake
3. Bolgoda South Lake
4. Panadura Ganga
5. Weras Ganga

The lake is a popular location for watersports with the Ceylon Motor Yacht Club located on the shores of the lake since 1936. The waterfront properties around the lake are owned by wealthy and notable individuals such as Mangala Samaraweera and Susanthika Jayasinghe.

== Lake environment ==
Illegal constructions near the lake are a major emerging issue, with the Sri Lankan government claiming that 90% of constructions have not obtained the required environmental approval. Pollution and irregular disposal of garbage are some other concerns facing the lake and its surroundings. The Sri Lanka Navy and the Police are involved in efforts to protect the wetlands.

== Gallery ==
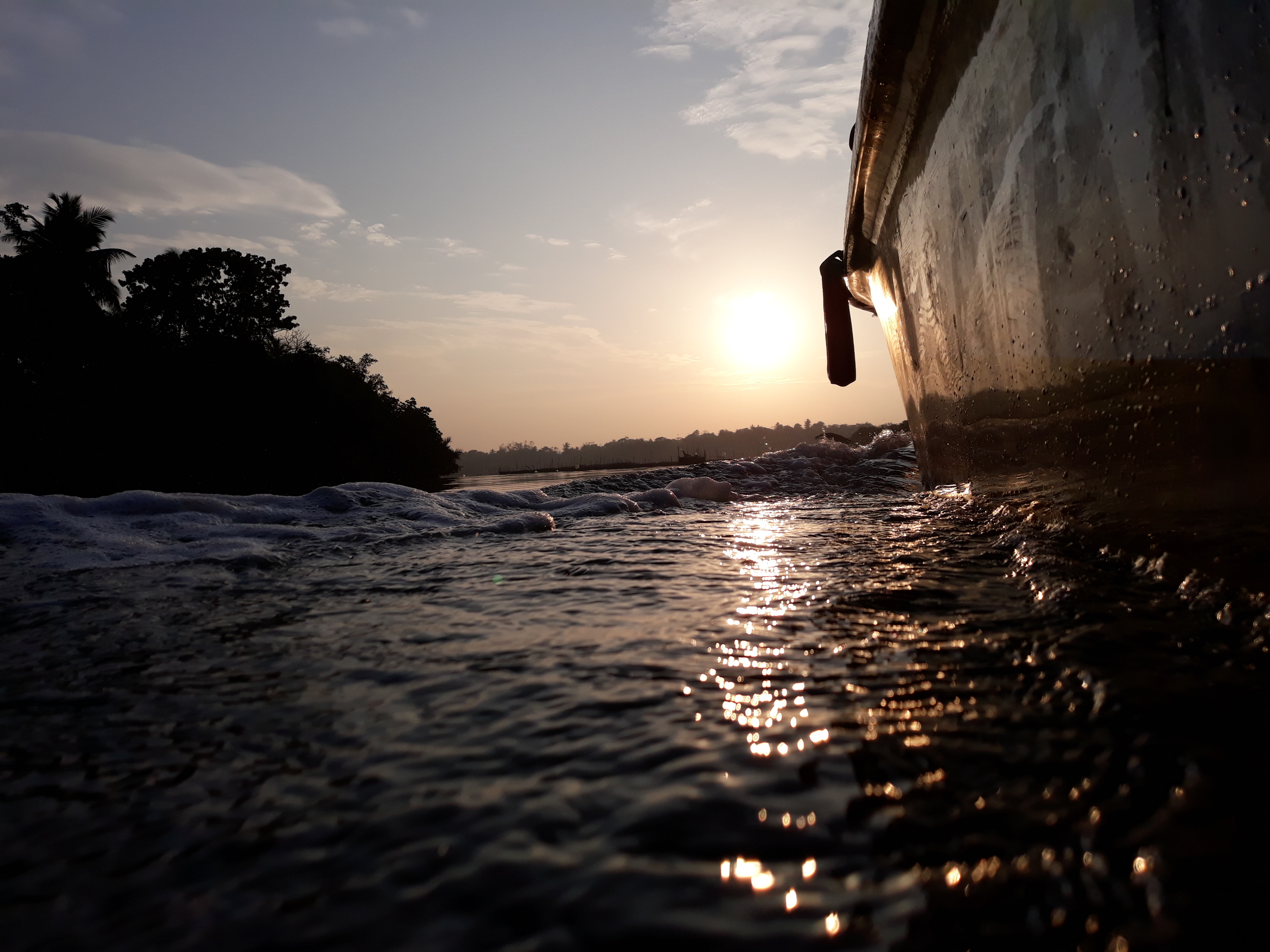
A boat on Bolgoda Lake

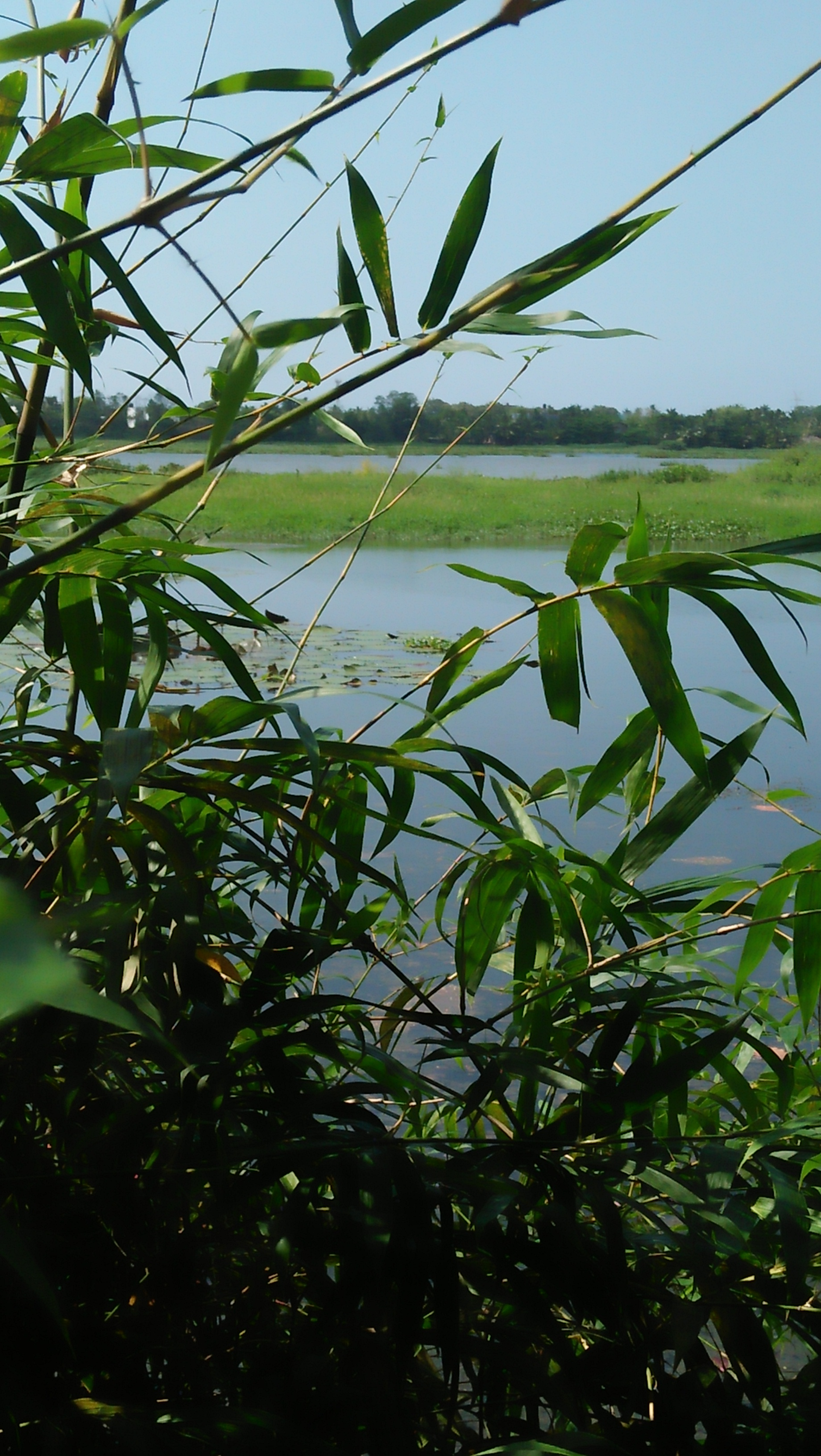
Bolgoda Lake captured through bamboo plants

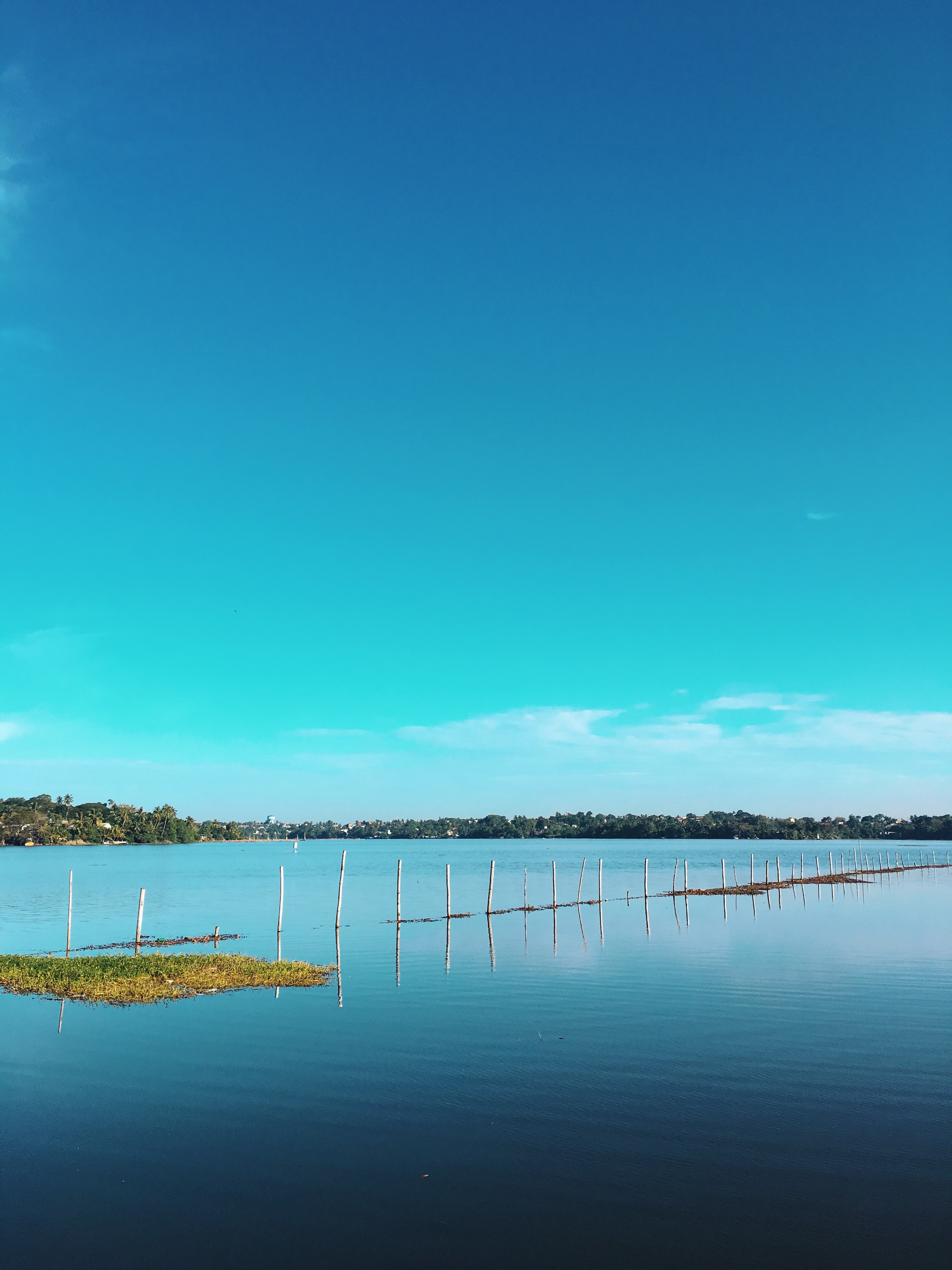
Prawn Fishing on Bolgoda Lake
