= Polgasowita =

Polgasowita පොල්ගස්ඕවිට போல்கசோவிட
- Location within Sri Lanka
- Coordinates: 6°47′3.00″N 79°58′52″E
- Country: Sri Lanka
- Province: Western Province
- Time zone: UTC+5:30 (SLT)

Polgasowita is a town and suburb in Colombo District, Western Province, Sri Lanka. It is located a short distance south-east of central Colombo, close to the Ratmalana Airport. It has a population of 15,000.
