= Vavuniya =

Vavuniya: வவுனியா; වවුනියාව
- City
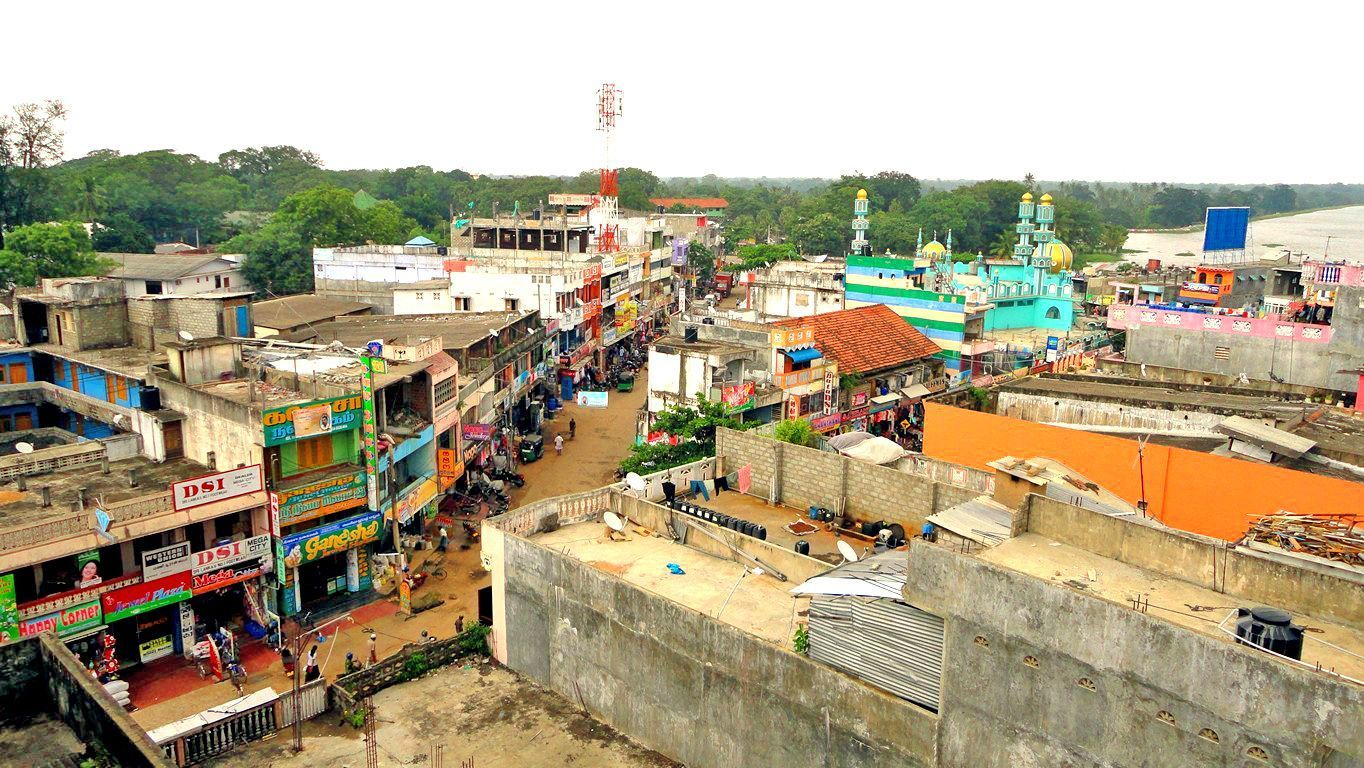
- Partial aerial view of Vavuniya

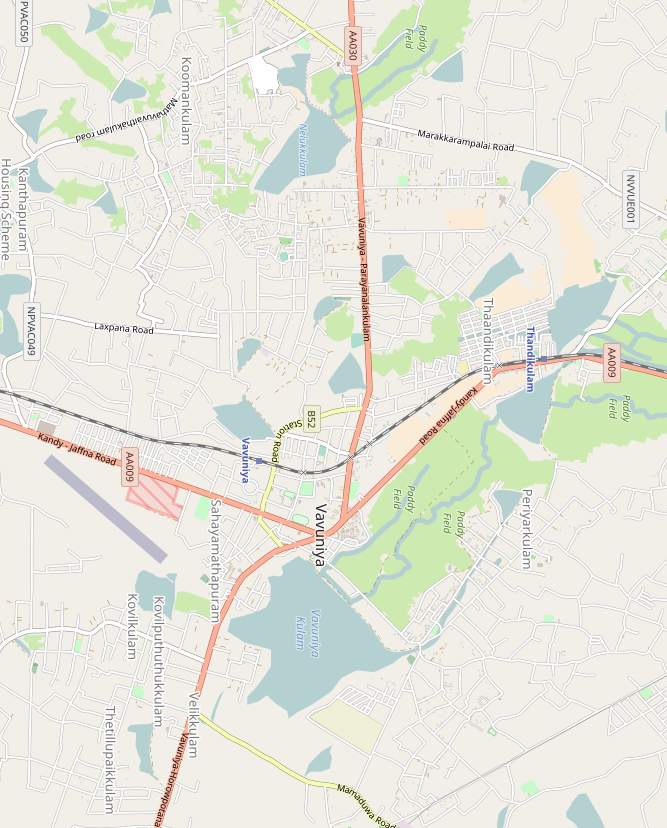
- Location within Greater Vavuniya Location within Northern Province Location within Sri Lanka Location within Asia
- Coordinates: 8°45′0″N 80°29′0″E
- Country: Sri Lanka
- Province: Northern
- District: Vavuniya
- DS Division: Vavuniya South (Tamil)

Government
  - Type: Municipal Council
  - Chairman: Gowthaman (TNA)

Area
  - Land: 22.4896 km^{2} (8.6833 sq mi)
- Elevation: 200 m (660 ft)
- Demonyms: Vavuniyan; Vanniyan
- Time zone: UTC+5:30 (Sri Lanka Standard Time Zone)
- Postal code: 43000
- Website: VUC

Vavuniya (Tamil: வவுனியா, romanized: Vavuniyā, Sinhala: වවුනියාව, romanized: Vavuniyāva) is a city in Vavuniya District in the Northern Province of Sri Lanka. The municipality is administered by a Municipal Council. The town has been known since ancient times, but being a heavily forested area, less than 100,000 people lived in the entire district before the Sri Lankan Civil War. The city is situated as a border town that divides the Tamil and Sinhalese population. To the south of the city are the Sinhalese population, and to the north are the Tamil population. The city has a large population of Tamils, Muslims, and a significant number of Sinhalese. In the early days, Vavuniya was known as Vanni due to the abundance of Vanni Trees. The Security Forces Headquarters - Wanni is located in Vavuniya.

== History ==
This city has a long history of being ruled by the Tamil kings, who built many tanks and placed Naga Sacred Guard Stones near them with inscriptions. They inherited the city from the ancient Yaka and Nagas of Sri Lanka. Later, the city became part of the Rajarata kingdom after the arrival of the Sinhalese Ancestor or Exiled Aryan (Vijaya) to Sri Lanka. The city experienced a revival of Hinduism (Shaivism) and Tamil culture after the Chola invasion and reformed as Vanni under the rule of Vanni Chieftains. However, the Cholas were soon defeated by the Pandya in Tamil Nadu, and the city fell under their control when they invaded Sri Lanka. The Pandya lost their power in Sri Lanka when the Vijayanagar Dynasty invaded and dispersed them. The Vanni Chieftains (Aryans), who had come with the Cholas, broke away from the Pandya and formed their own Vanni nation (Not a nation but a collection of small nations), which was loyal to the central government. The Vanni resisted the Portuguese occupation but succumbed to the Dutch invasion despite the heroism of Pandara Vanniyan. The city then came under British rule when the Dutch were succeeded by the British in Sri Lanka at the start of the 19th century.

The British granted independence to Sri Lanka, but the Sinhalese oppression sparked a war that forced many affluent people to migrate abroad or to Vavuniya. Vavuniya is a city that was heavily affected by the war but has since recovered. Now, Tamils, Muslims, and Sinhalese live together without distinction. The district recently got its own university (University of Vavuniya), and there are plans to upgrade the district airport to an international airport.

== Climate ==
Vavuniya has a tropical savanna climate (Köppen: As) with warm to hot temperatures throughout the year and a distinct wet season from October to December. Temperatures are cooler from November to February compared to the rest of the year.

Climate data for Vavuniya (1991–2020)
Month	Jan	Feb	Mar	Apr	May	Jun	Jul	Aug	Sep	Oct	Nov	Dec	Year
Record high °C (°F)	34.0 (93.2)	36.0 (96.8)	38.8 (101.8)	40.1 (104.2)	38.8 (101.8)	38.5 (101.3)	38.8 (101.8)	38.4 (101.1)	39.1 (102.4)	38.1 (100.6)	35.0 (95.0)	33.0 (91.4)	40.1 (104.2)
Mean daily maximum °C (°F)	29.9 (85.8)	31.5 (88.7)	34.3 (93.7)	34.9 (94.8)	34.3 (93.7)	34.4 (93.9)	34.7 (94.5)	34.6 (94.3)	34.5 (94.1)	32.6 (90.7)	30.6 (87.1)	29.6 (85.3)	33.0 (91.4)
Daily mean °C (°F)	25.5 (77.9)	26.4 (79.5)	28.4 (83.1)	29.5 (85.1)	29.7 (85.5)	29.8 (85.6)	29.9 (85.8)	29.7 (85.5)	29.6 (85.3)	28.2 (82.8)	26.7 (80.1)	25.8 (78.4)	28.3 (82.9)
Mean daily minimum °C (°F)	20.9 (69.6)	21.1 (70.0)	22.4 (72.3)	24.0 (75.2)	25.0 (77.0)	25.1 (77.2)	24.9 (76.8)	24.7 (76.5)	24.4 (75.9)	23.6 (74.5)	22.7 (72.9)	21.9 (71.4)	23.4 (74.1)
Record low °C (°F)	12.4 (54.3)	10.5 (50.9)	13.4 (56.1)	15.3 (59.5)	17.8 (64.0)	18.8 (65.8)	18.2 (64.8)	18.2 (64.8)	18.5 (65.3)	16.0 (60.8)	16.5 (61.7)	13.0 (55.4)	10.5 (50.9)
Average precipitation mm (inches)	107.0 (4.21)	76.2 (3.00)	43.1 (1.70)	123.1 (4.85)	95.4 (3.76)	21.1 (0.83)	36.9 (1.45)	63.9 (2.52)	88.7 (3.49)	230.0 (9.06)	276.0 (10.87)	249.1 (9.81)	1,410.5 (55.53)
Average precipitation days (≥ 1.0 mm)	7.1	4.7	3.9	9.2	5.8	2.1	2.6	4.1	5.7	13.3	17.1	12.5	88.0
Source: NOAA

== Demographics ==
The total population of the Northern Province, as per the statistics, is 1.246 million, the least populous province in the country, with 606,678 males (47.3%) and 639,775 females (52.7%). The population density is 136 persons per Sq. km as against 346 for the whole Island. The majority of the province lives in areas classified as rural (84.5%), and only 15.5% of the population lives in areas classified as urban. The majority of the population, i.e., 89% in the province, are Sri Lankan Tamils, and others are Sri Lankan Moors, Sinhalese, and Indian Tamils living in the province. Most of the Sri Lankan Tamils are Hindus, and the other religious persuasions in the province are Christians, Muslims, and a small number of Buddhists. The graph here shows the difference in ethnic composition from province to district to city. While usually, the city usually shows a more cosmopolitan nature than the province. The Vavuniya city reflects the composition of the district quite closely, even more so than the provincial percentages.

1. Sri Lankan Tamils (84.3%)
2. Sri Lankan Moors (8.22%)
3. Sinhalese (6.52%)
4. Indian Tamils (0.93%)

== Electoral Wards ==
Ward Number	Area
1	Thandikkulam
2	Paddanichipuliyankulam
3	Pandarikulam
4	Vairavarpuliyankulam
5	Kudiyiruppu
6	Kadai Veethi
7	Moondru Muripu
8	Rambaikulam
9	Sinnaputhukkulam
10	Kovilkulam

== Transport ==
Vavuniya railway station, which is located on the Northern Line connects Kankesanthurai (the northern terminus of the line) through to Colombo. During the civil war Vavuniya was the terminus of the Northern Line.Vavuniya airport, which is an air force base and a domestic airport is also located here. Vavuniya is situated in the middle of the Vanni region and is the gateway to the northern province, where people can access all the northern cities quickly.

== Educational Areas ==
Vavuniya is divided into 4 educational divisions, such as Vavuniya North, Vavuniya South, Vavuniya South-Sinhala division, and Chettikulam. Vavuniya City comes under the Vavuniya South Division.

== See also ==
- Vipulanantha College
- Nedunkerny
- Pandarikulam
- Nelukkulam
- Vavuniya kulam
- Vavuniya Tamil Madhya Maha Vidyalayam
- Rambaikulam
- Rambaikulam SriGanavairavar kovil
