= Kesbewa =

Kesbewa කැස්බැව கெஸ்பேவா
- Location in Colombo District
- Coordinates: 6°47′43″N 79°56′19″E
- Country: Sri Lanka
- Province: Western Province
- District: Colombo District

Area
  - Total: 50.39 km^{2} (19.46 sq mi)

Population (2012)
  - Total: 243,842
  - Density: 3,488/km^{2} (9,030/sq mi)
- Time zone: UTC+05:30
- Postal code: 10300

Kesbewa (Sinhala: කැස්බැව, Tamil: கெஸ்பேவா) is a suburb town of the city of Colombo, Sri Lanka, situated approximately 20 km (12 mi) south of Colombo. It is one of the relatively more populated suburbs located in the Colombo District of the Western Province and it is surrounded by the other suburbs of Moratuwa, Maharagama, Pannipitiya, Bandaragama and Kahathuduwa. The Kesbewa Urban Council is located in Piliyandala.

== Transport ==
=== Roads ===
Two major roads run through Kesbewa; the road connecting Colombo and Horana, known as the 120 bus route, and the road connecting Mount Lavinia and Kottawa (the 255 bus route). In addition, a new bypass road named the "Piliyandala Bypass Road" was built in 2015 connecting Piliyandala and Kesbewa Junction. The beaches of Mount Lavinia are a 15-30 minute drive away from Piliyandala.There are other bus routes from Maharagama to Piliyandala, and Bandaragama to Pilyandala (the 162 bus route).
