= Vavuniya Urban Council =

Sri Lankan local authority

Vavuniya Urban Council வவுனியா நகர சபை

Type
- Type: Local authority

Leadership
- Chairman: Iyaththurai Kanagiah, TNA since July 2011
- Deputy Chairman: Muththuchchuwamy Muhuntharathan, TNA since August 2009
- Secretary: V. Vasanthakumar
- Seats: 11

Elections
- Last election: 2009 Sri Lankan local government elections

Vavuniya Urban Council (Tamil: வவுனியா நகர சபை Vavuṉiyā Nakara Capai; VUC) is the local authority for the city of Vavuniya in northern Sri Lanka. VUC is responsible for providing a variety of local public services including roads, sanitation, drains, housing, libraries, public parks and recreational facilities. It has 11 members elected using the open list proportional representation system.

== Election results ==
=== 1983 local government election ===
Results of the local government election held on 18 May 1983:

Alliances and parties	Votes	%	Seats
Tamil United Liberation Front	5,454	77.04%	9
United National Party	1,625	22.96%	2
Valid Votes	7,079	100.00%	11
Rejected Votes	69		
Total Polled	7,148		
Registered Electors	10,230		
Turnout	69.87%		

According to the pro-LTTE TamilNet, the Sri Lankan government had suspended all local government in the north and east of the country in 1983 using emergency regulations. The civil war prevented elections from being held for VUC until 1994 as the LTTE did not hold elections when it controlled the area..

In March 1994 elections were held in the east and in Vavuniya in the north. However, elections weren't held in other areas of the north, including the Jaffna Peninsula, because most of these areas were at that time controlled by the rebel Tamil Tigers. In August 1995 the Sri Lankan military launched an offensive to recapture the Jaffna Peninsula. By December 1995 the military had captured most of the Valikamam region of the peninsula, including the city of Jaffna. By 16 May 1996 the military had recaptured the entire peninsula. In late 1996 the government announced elections would be held for 23 local authorities in Jaffna District, Kilinochchi District, Mannar District and Vavuniya District but following opposition from Tamil political parties postponed them. On 3 December 1997 the government announced that elections would be held for the 17 local authorities on the Jaffna Peninsula. The Tamil political parties were still opposed to holding elections as "normalcy" hadn't returned to the peninsula. The peninsula was under the firm grip of the Sri Lankan military and civil government had little, if any, role in the administration of the peninsula. The Tamil Tigers were also firmly against the elections being held. Despite these objections the elections were held on 29 January 1998.

On 1 January 2002 local authority elections were called for the entire country. It was later announced that elections would be held on 25 March 2002 in the north and east, and on 20 March 2002 in the rest of the country. The normal life term of Sri Lankan local government bodies is four years. The life term of VUC expired in February 2002 but the central government extended this by another year, as the law allows. On 21 March 2002 the Election Commissioner announced that the elections in the north and east, except for eight local authorities in Ampara District, had been postponed until 25 September 2002. On 17 September 2002 elections in the north and east were postponed, for a second time, until 25 June 2003. Elections should have been held when the extension expired in February 2003 but in January 2003, following a request from the Tamil National Alliance, the central government instead dissolved VUC using emergency powers and instead put in place special commissioners to administer the local area. In June 2003 elections in the north and east were postponed, for a third time, until 24 January 2004. In January 2004 elections in the north and east, except for local authorities in Ampara District, were postponed, for a fourth time, until 23 October 2004.

On 27 January 2006 local authority elections were called for the entire country. It was later announced that elections would be held on 30 March 2006 across the entire country. The Election Commissioner subsequently postponed the elections in the north and Batticaloa District until 30 September 2006. On 23 September 2006 elections in the north and Batticaloa District were postponed until 30 June 2007.

VUC continued to be administered by special commissioners until the 2009 elections.

=== 2009 local government election ===
Results of the local government election held on 8 August 2009:

Alliances and parties	Votes	%	Seats
Tamil National Alliance (ITAK, EPRLF (S), TELO)	4,279	34.81%	5
Democratic People's Liberation Front (PLOTE, EPRLF (V), TULF)	4,136	33.65%	3
United People's Freedom Alliance (EPDP, SLFP, ACMC et al.)	3,045	24.77%	2
Sri Lanka Muslim Congress	587	4.78%	1
United National Party	228	1.85%	0
Sri Lanka Progressive Front	10	0.08%	0
Independent 1	6	0.05%	0
Independent 3	1	0.01%	0
Independent 2	0	0.00%	0
Valid Votes	12,292	100.00%	11
Rejected Votes	558		
Total Polled	12,850		
Registered Electors	24,626		
Turnout	52.18%		

The following candidates were elected: Kanthar Thamotharampillai Linganathan (DPLF), 2,958 preference votes (pv); Muttu Sivasami Muguntharathan (TNA), 2,551 pv; Abdul Pari Muhammadu Sareep (UPFA), 2,270 pv; Rathinasigam Sivakumar (TNA), 1,105 pv; S. N. G. Nathan (TNA), 1,099 pv; Sundaram Kumarasamy (DPLF), 962 pv; Jayasekara Arachchige Dhammika Lalith Jayasekara (UPFA), 952 pv; Sellaththurai Surenthiran (TNA), 858 pv; Kandasamy Partheepan (DPLF), 834 pv; Iyaththurai Kanagiah (TNA), 791 pv; and Abdul Latif Mohamed Munawfar (SLMC) 665 pv.

S. N. G. Nathan (TNA) and Muttu Sivasami Muguntharathan (TNA) were appointed chairman and deputy chairman respectively.

S. N. G. Nathan (TNA) ceased to be member of VUC in May 2011 after ceasing to be a member of the TNA. He was replaced as chairman by Iyaththurai Kanagiah (TNA). Ponnaiah Sellathurai (TNA) replaced him on VUC.

Kanthar Thamotharampillai Linganathan (DPLF) resigned from VUC and was replaced by Suwampillai Thevakingsly Rajeswaran (DPLF).
