= Postal codes in Sri Lanka =

Postal codes in Sri Lanka are five digit numbers used by Sri Lanka Postal Service, that identifies each postal jurisdiction to sort mail more efficiently. They were first introduced in 1997.

== See also ==
- ISO 3166-2:LK
- Sri Lanka Post
- Subdivisions of Sri Lanka
- Telephone numbers in Sri Lanka
