= 1803 =

1803 in various calendars
- Gregorian calendar: 1803; MDCCCIII
- French Republican calendar: 11–12; XI–XII
- Ab urbe condita: 2556
- Armenian calendar: 1252; ԹՎ ՌՄԾԲ
- Assyrian calendar: 6553
- Balinese saka calendar: 1724–1725
- Bengali calendar: 1209–1210
- Berber calendar: 2753
- British Regnal year: 43 Geo. 3 – 44 Geo. 3
- Buddhist calendar: 2347
- Burmese calendar: 1165
- Byzantine calendar: 7311–7312
- Chinese calendar: 壬戌年 (Water Dog); 4500 or 4293 — to — 癸亥年 (Water Pig); 4501 or 4294
- Coptic calendar: 1519–1520
- Discordian calendar: 2969
- Ethiopian calendar: 1795–1796
- Hebrew calendar: 5563–5564
- Hindu calendars
- Vikram Samvat: 1859–1860
- Shaka Samvat: 1724–1725
- Kali Yuga: 4903–4904
- Holocene calendar: 11803
- Igbo calendar: 803–804
- Iranian calendar: 1181–1182
- Islamic calendar: 1217–1218
- Japanese calendar: Kyōwa 2 (享和２年)
- Javanese calendar: 1729–1730
- Julian calendar: Gregorian minus 12 days
- Korean calendar: 4136
- Minguo calendar: 109 before ROC 民前109年
- Nanakshahi calendar: 335
- Thai solar calendar: 2345–2346
- Tibetan calendar: ཆུ་ཕོ་ཁྱི་ལོ་ (male Water-Dog); 1929 or 1548 or 776 — to — ཆུ་མོ་ཕག་ལོ་ (female Water-Boar); 1930 or 1549 or 777

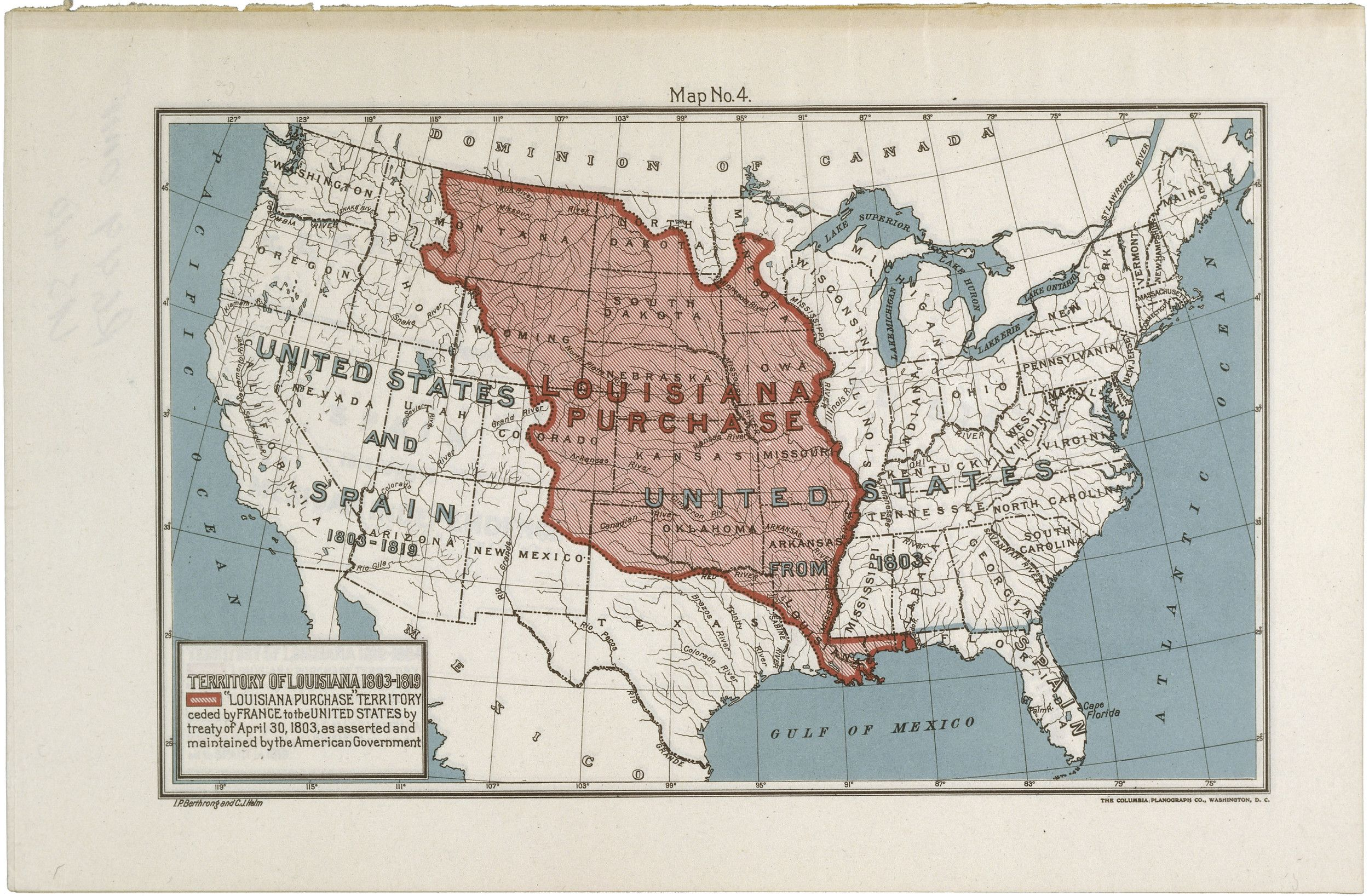
December 20: U.S. increases in size with Louisiana purchase

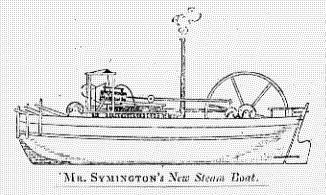
January 5: steamboat Charlotte Dundas is demonstrated.

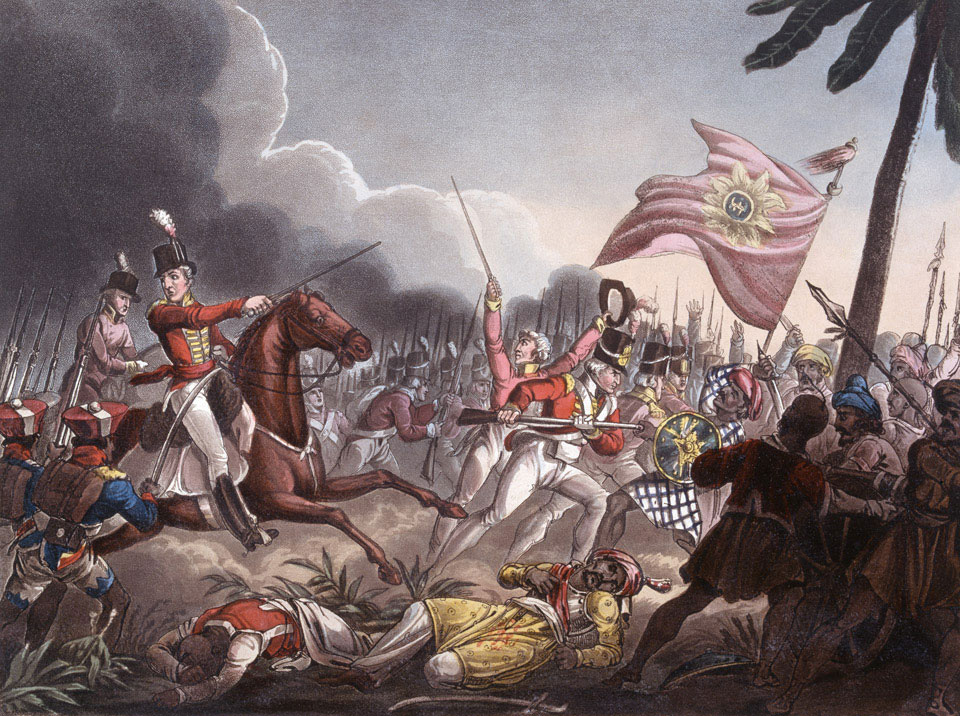
September 23: Battle of Assaye

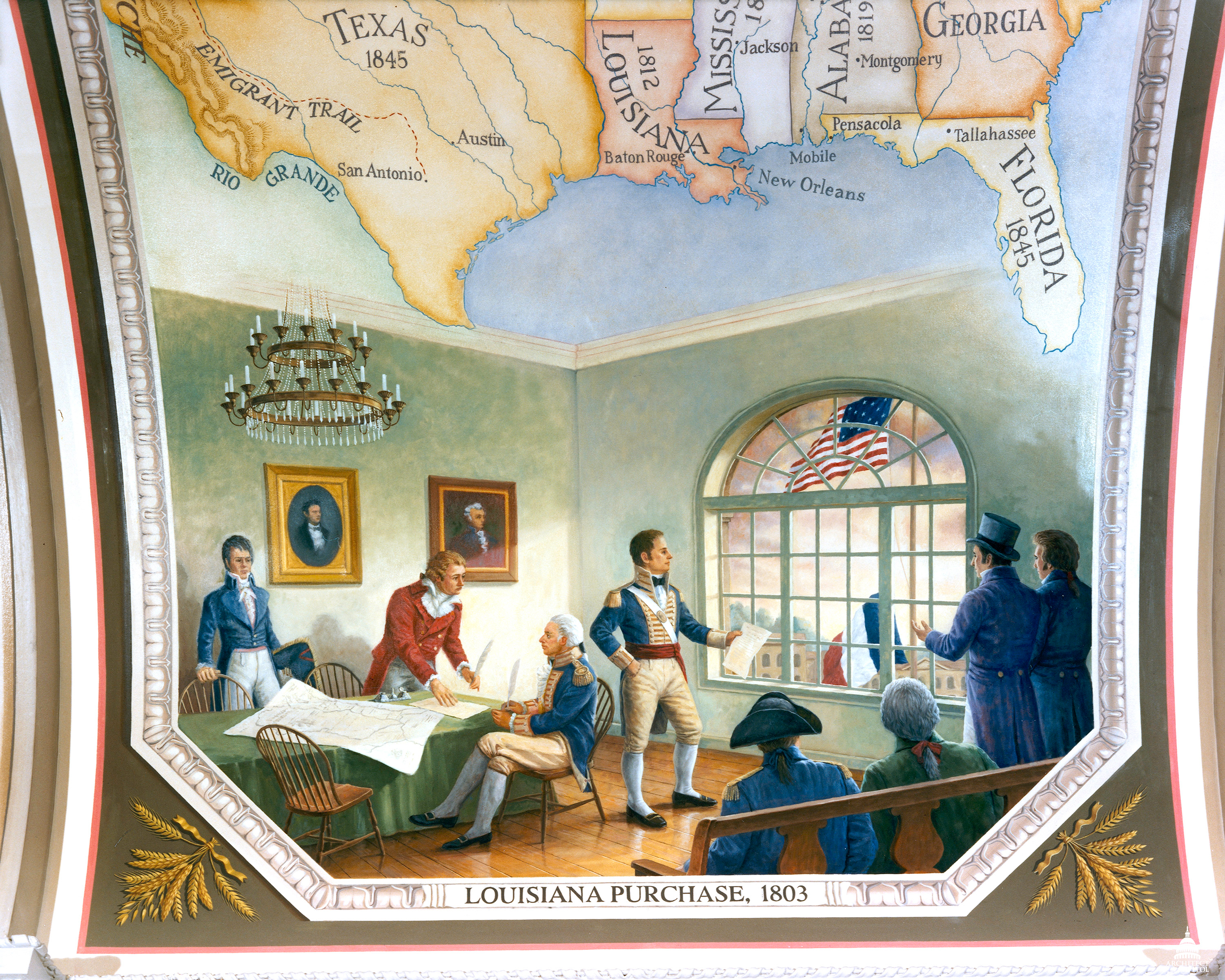
Completing the Louisiana Purchase from France .

1803 (MDCCCIII) was a common year starting on Saturday of the Gregorian calendar and a common year starting on Thursday of the Julian calendar, the 1803rd year of the Common Era (CE) and Anno Domini (AD) designations, the 803rd year of the 2nd millennium, the 3rd year of the 19th century, and the 4th year of the 1800s decade. As of the start of 1803, the Gregorian calendar was 12 days ahead of the Julian calendar, which remained in localized use until 1923.

== Events ==
=== January–March ===
- January 1 – The first edition of Alexandre Balthazar Laurent Grimod de La Reynière's Almanach des gourmands, the first guide to restaurant cooking, is published in Paris.
- January 4 – William Symington demonstrates his Charlotte Dundas, the "first practical steamboat", in Scotland.
- January 30 – Monroe and Livingston sail for Paris to discuss, and possibly buy, New Orleans; they end up completing the Louisiana Purchase.
- February 19
  - An Act of Mediation, issued by Napoleon Bonaparte, establishes the Swiss Confederation to replace the Helvetic Republic. Under the terms of the act, Graubünden, St. Gallen, Thurgau, the Ticino and Vaud become Swiss cantons.
  - Ohio is admitted as the 17th U.S. state.
- February 20 – Kandyan Wars: Kandy, Ceylon is taken by a British detachment.
- February 21 – Edward Despard and six others are hanged and beheaded for plotting to assassinate King George III, and to destroy the Bank of England.
- February 24 – Marbury v. Madison: The Supreme Court of the United States establishes the principle of judicial review.
- February 25 – A major redistribution of territorial sovereignty within the Holy Roman Empire is enacted, via an act known as the Reichsdeputationshauptschluss.
- March 9 – Aargau becomes a Swiss canton.

=== April–June ===
- March–April – The franc germinal is introduced in France.
- April 5 — Ludwig van Beethoven puts on a big Akademie concert at the Theater an der Wien, in Vienna consisting of the premieres of his second symphony, third piano concerto, and his oratorio Christ on the Mount of Olives.
- April 26 – The L'Aigle meteorite falls in Normandy, causing a shift in scientific opinion on the origin of meteorites.
- April 30 – The Louisiana Purchase is made from France by the United States.
- May – First Consul of France, Citizen Bonaparte, begins making preparations to invade England.
- May 18 – The Napoleonic Wars begin, when the United Kingdom declares war on France, after France refuses to withdraw from Dutch territory.
- May 19 – Master Malati, a Coptic Christian leader, is beheaded by a Muslim mob in Cairo, Egypt.
- June 7 – Indiana Territory governor (and future U.S. president) William Henry Harrison signs treaties at Fort Wayne, with representatives of the Delaware, Shawnee, Potawatomi, Miami, Kickapoo, Eel River, Wea, Piankeshaw and Kaskaskia Indian tribes. The U.S. Senate ratifies the treaties on November 25.
- June 14 – Napoleon Bonaparte orders the establishment of five military camps to defend the coast of France, located at Bayonne, Ghent, Saint-Omer, Compiègne, Saint-Malo, and one in the occupied Netherlands, at Utrecht. Each one has 20,000 infantry and 2,000 cavalry to defend it.

=== July–September ===
- July 4 – The Louisiana Purchase is announced to the American people.
- July 5 – The convention of Artlenburg leads to the French occupation of Hanover (which had been ruled by the British king).
- July 23 – Robert Emmet's uprising in Ireland begins.
- July 26 – The wagonway between Wandsworth and Croydon is opened, being the first public railway line in England.
- August 3 – The British begin the Second Anglo-Maratha War, against the Scindia Dynasty of Gwalior.
- August 31 – The Lewis and Clark Expedition begins as Lewis and a crew of 11 depart on the Ohio River.
- September 6 – John Dalton, British scientist, begins using symbols to represent the atoms of different elements.
- September 11 – Second Anglo-Maratha War: Battle of Delhi – British troops under General Lake defeat the Marathas of Scindia's army, under General Louis Bourquin.
- September 20 – Irish rebel Robert Emmet is executed.
- September 23 – Second Anglo-Maratha War: Battle of Assaye – British-led troops defeat Maratha forces.

=== October–December ===
- October 14 – Orissa, an area of India along the Bay of Bengal that comprises the modern-day Indian state of Odisha, is occupied by the British under the British East India Company, after the Second Anglo-Maratha War. The Maratha Empire formally cedes the area in the Treaty of Deogaon, signed on December 17.
- October 20 – The Senate ratifies the Louisiana Purchase Treaty, doubling the size of the United States.
- November 18 – Haitian Revolution: Battle of Vertières – The Haitian army, led by Jean-Jacques Dessalines, defeats the French army sent by Napoleon.
- November 30
  - The Balmis Expedition starts in Spain, with the aim of vaccinating millions against smallpox in Spanish America and the Philippines.
  - At the Cabildo in New Orleans, Spanish representatives Governor Manuel de Salcedo and the Marqués de Casa Calvo officially transfer Louisiana (New Spain) to French representative Prefect Pierre Clément de Laussat. Barely three weeks later, France transfers the same land to the United States.
- December 9 – The proposed Twelfth Amendment to the United States Constitution, requiring that electoral ballots distinctly list the choice for president and the choice for vice president, is approved by Congress for submission to the states for ratification; passed in the wake of the problems in the 1800 presidential election, the amendment is ratified by 13 of the 17 states and is proclaimed in effect on September 25, 1804.
- December 20 – The Louisiana Purchase is completed as the French prefect, de Laussat, formally transfers ownership of land between the Mississippi River and the Rocky Mountains to the United States, by way of commissioners William C. C. Claiborne and James Wilkinson. Claiborne is appointed as the area's first American governor.

=== Date unknown ===
- Major breakthroughs in chemistry occur, with the identification of the elements rhodium and palladium (by William Hyde Wollaston); osmium and iridium (by Smithson Tennant); and cerium (by Wilhelm Hisinger, Jons Jakob Berzelius and Martin Heinrich Klaproth)

== Births ==
=== January–June ===
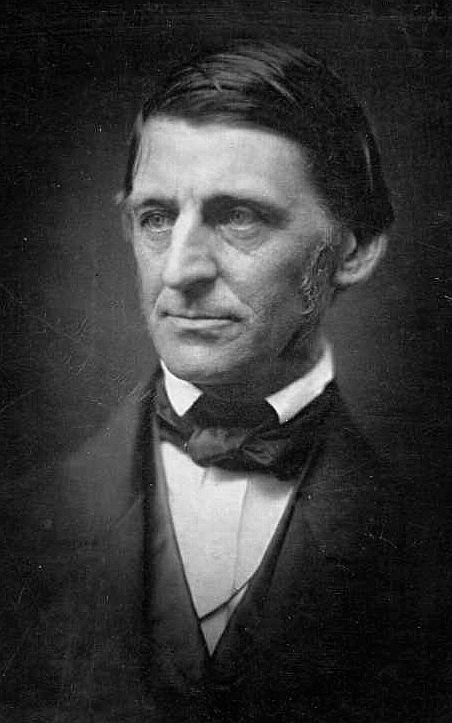
Ralph Waldo Emerson

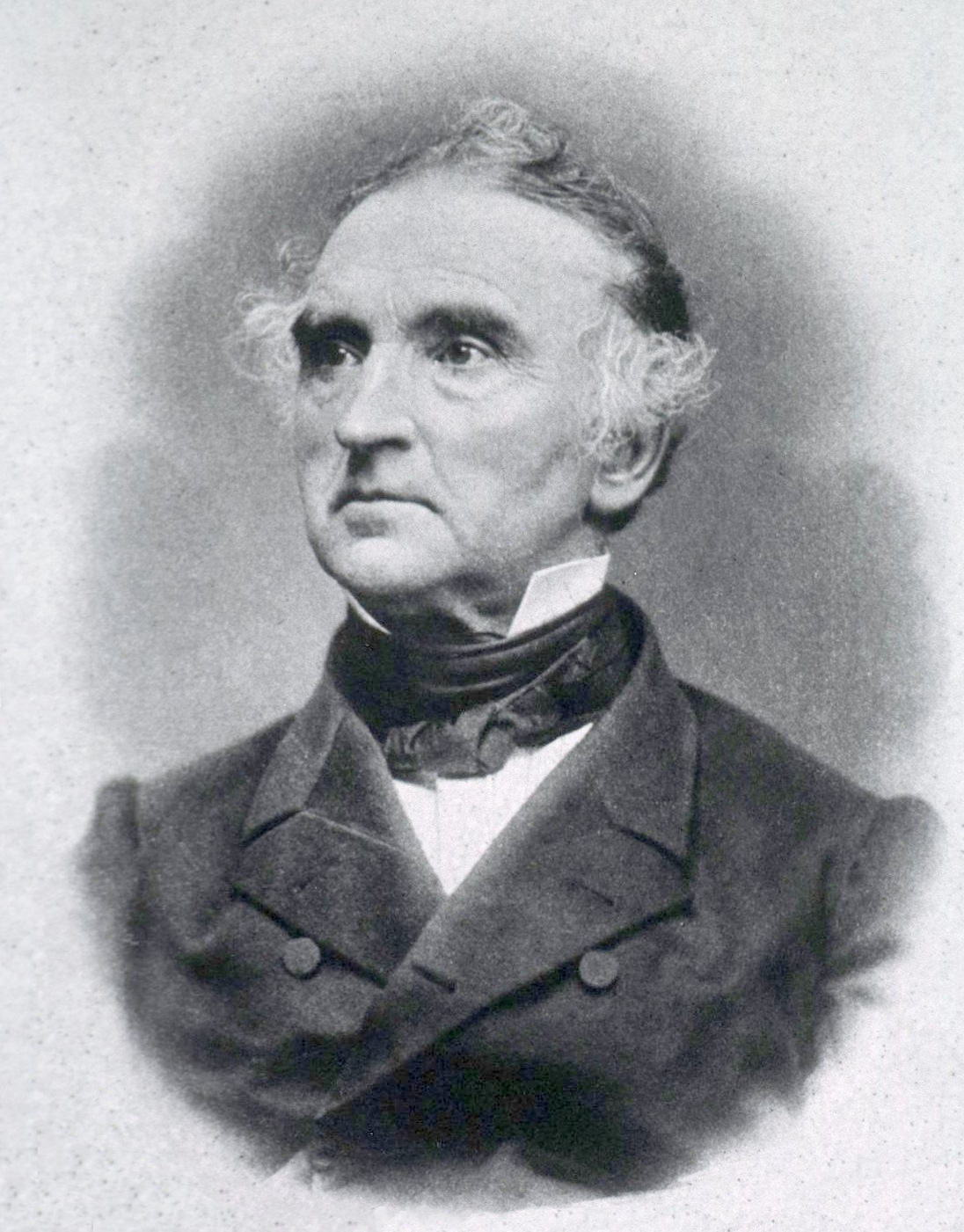
Justus von Liebig

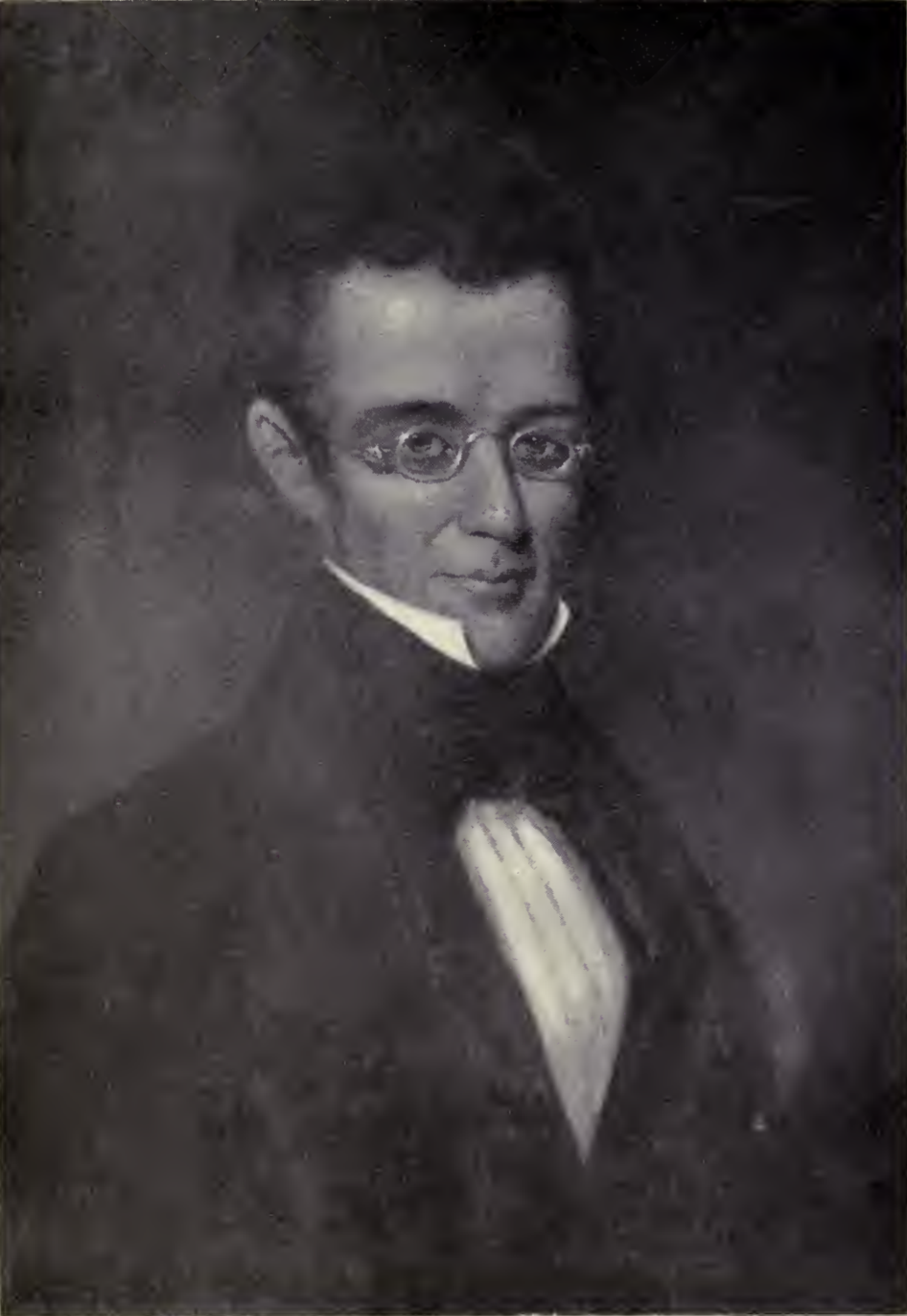
Osgood Johnson

- February 2 – Albert Sidney Johnston, American Confederate general (d. 1862)
- February 4 – Antonija Höffern, Slovene noblewoman and educator (d. 1871)
- February 15
  - Karl Friedrich Schimper, German botanist, naturalist and poet (d. 1867)
  - John Sutter, German-American pioneer (d. 1880)
- February 26 – Arnold Adolph Berthold, German physiologist, zoologist (d. 1861)
- March 12 – Guillaume de Felice, Savoy nobleman, abolitionist (d. 1871)
- March 13 – John Boyle, British politician (d. 1874)
- March 16 – Nikolay Yazykov, Russian poet, Slavophile (d. 1846)
- March 27 – Charles Lafontaine, Swiss mesmerist (d. 1892)
- April 7 – Flora Tristan, French feminist (d. 1844)
- April 18 – Charles Ferdinand Pahud, Governor-General of the Dutch East Indies (d. 1873)
- April 30
  - Jeremiah E. Cary, American politician (d. 1888)
  - Albrecht von Roon, Prime Minister of Prussia (d. 1879)
- May 12 – Justus von Liebig, German chemist (d. 1873)
- May 20 – Ann Walker, English landowner and philanthropist (d. 1854)
- May 24 – Charles Lucien Bonaparte, French naturalist, ornithologist (d. 1857)
- May 25
  - Edward Bulwer-Lytton, English novelist, playwright and politician (d. 1873)
  - Ralph Waldo Emerson, American writer (d. 1882)
- June 8 – Amalia Assur, Swedish dentist (d. 1889)
- June 24 – George James Webb, English-born composer (d. 1887)

=== July–December ===
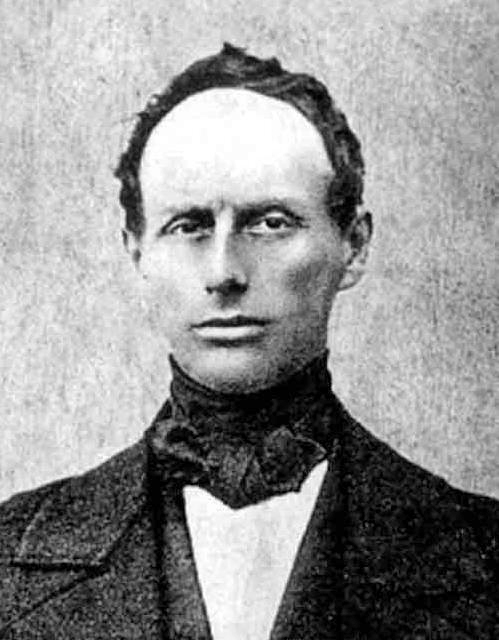
Christian Doppler

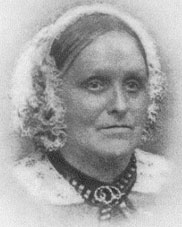
Susannah Moodie

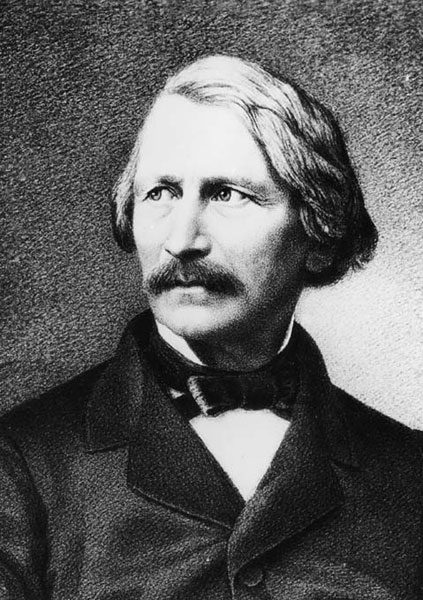
Gottfried Semper

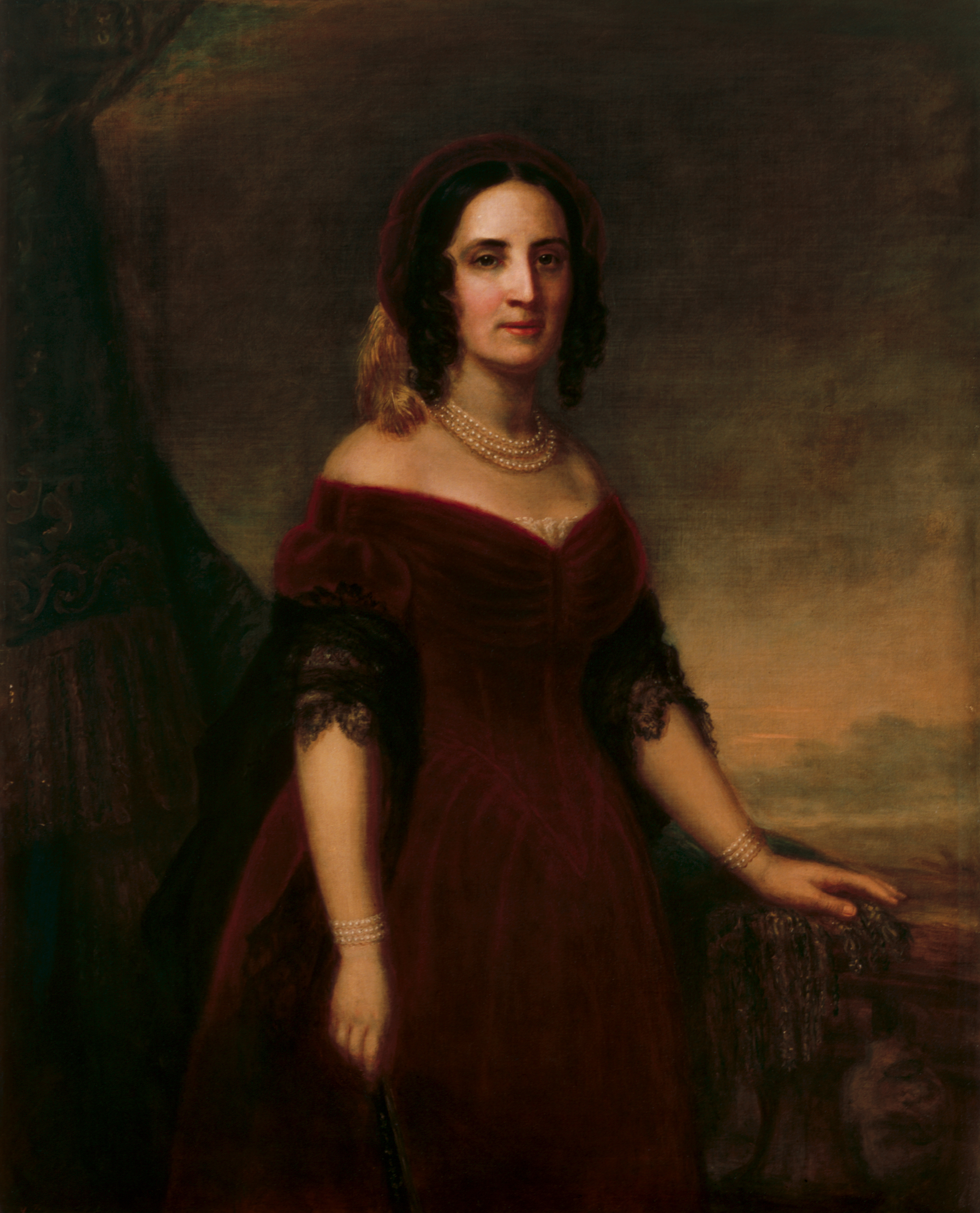
Sarah Childress Polk

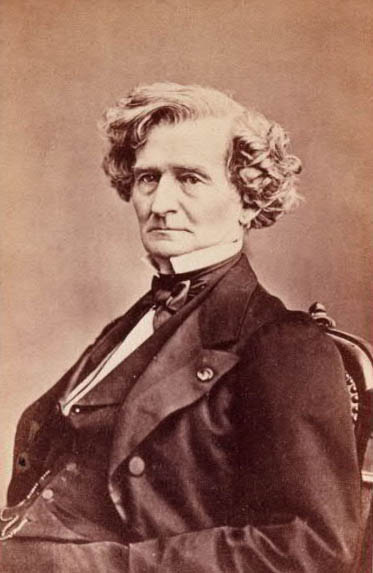
Hector Berlioz

- July 10 – William Todd (1803–1873), American businessman, Canadian senate nominee
- July 20 – John Hymers, English mathematician (d. 1887)
- July 24 – Adolphe Adam, French composer (d. 1856)
- July 31 – John Ericsson, Swedish inventor, engineer (d. 1889)
- August – Francesca Anna Canfield, American linguist, poet and translator (d. 1833)
- August 3
  - Mary Dominus, American settler of Hawaii (d. 1889)
  - Sir Joseph Paxton, English gardener, architect and Member of Parliament (d. 1865)
- August 10 – Joseph Vinoy, French general (d. 1880)
- August 13 – Vladimir Odoyevsky, Russian philosopher, writer, music critic (d. 1869)
- August 18 – Nathan Clifford, American politician, Associate Justice of the Supreme Court of the United States (d. 1881)
- August 23
  - Jan Erazim Vocel, Czech poet, archaeologist, historian and cultural revivalist (d. 1871)
  - Gustaf Wappers, Belgian painter (d. 1874)
- August 27 – Edward Beecher, American theologian (d. 1895)
- September 4
  - Anna Nielsen, Danish mezzo-soprano (d. 1856)
  - Sarah Childress Polk, First Lady of the United States (d. 1891)
- September 11 – Francisca Zubiaga y Bernales, first lady of Peru, controversial socialite (d. 1835)
- September 27 – Samuel Francis Du Pont, American admiral (d. 1865)
- September 28 – Prosper Mérimée, French writer (d. 1870)
- September 29 – Mercator Cooper, American sea captain (d. 1872)
- September 30 – Gustav von Alvensleben, Prussian general (d. 1881)
- October 5 – Friedrich Bernhard Westphal, Danish-German painter (d. 1844)
- October 16 – Robert Stephenson, English civil engineer (d. 1859)
- November 11 – Adolf von Bonin, Prussian general (d. 1872)
- November 14 – Jacob Abbott, American writer (d. 1879)
- November 29
  - Christian Doppler, Austrian mathematician (d. 1853)
  - Gottfried Semper, German architect (d. 1879)
- December 5 – Fyodor Tyutchev, great Russian Romantic poet (d. 1873)
- December 6 – Susanna Moodie, English writer (d. 1885)
- December 11 – Hector Berlioz, French composer (d. 1869)

=== Date unknown ===
- Ahmad al-Bakkai al-Kunti, West African Islamic and political leader (d. 1865)
- Barbarita Nieves, Venezuelan mistress of José Antonio Páez (d. 1847)

== Deaths ==
=== January–June ===
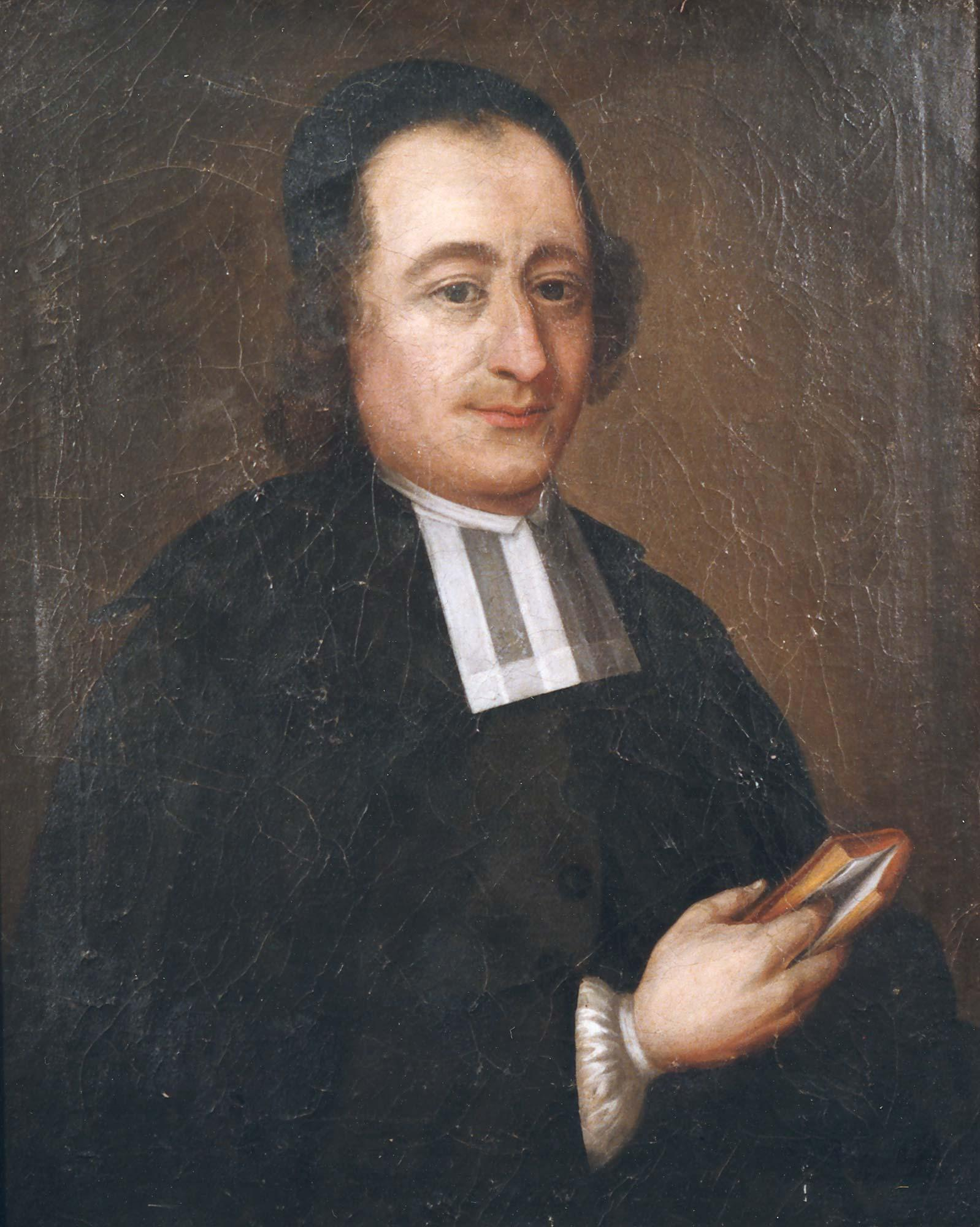
Anders Chydenius

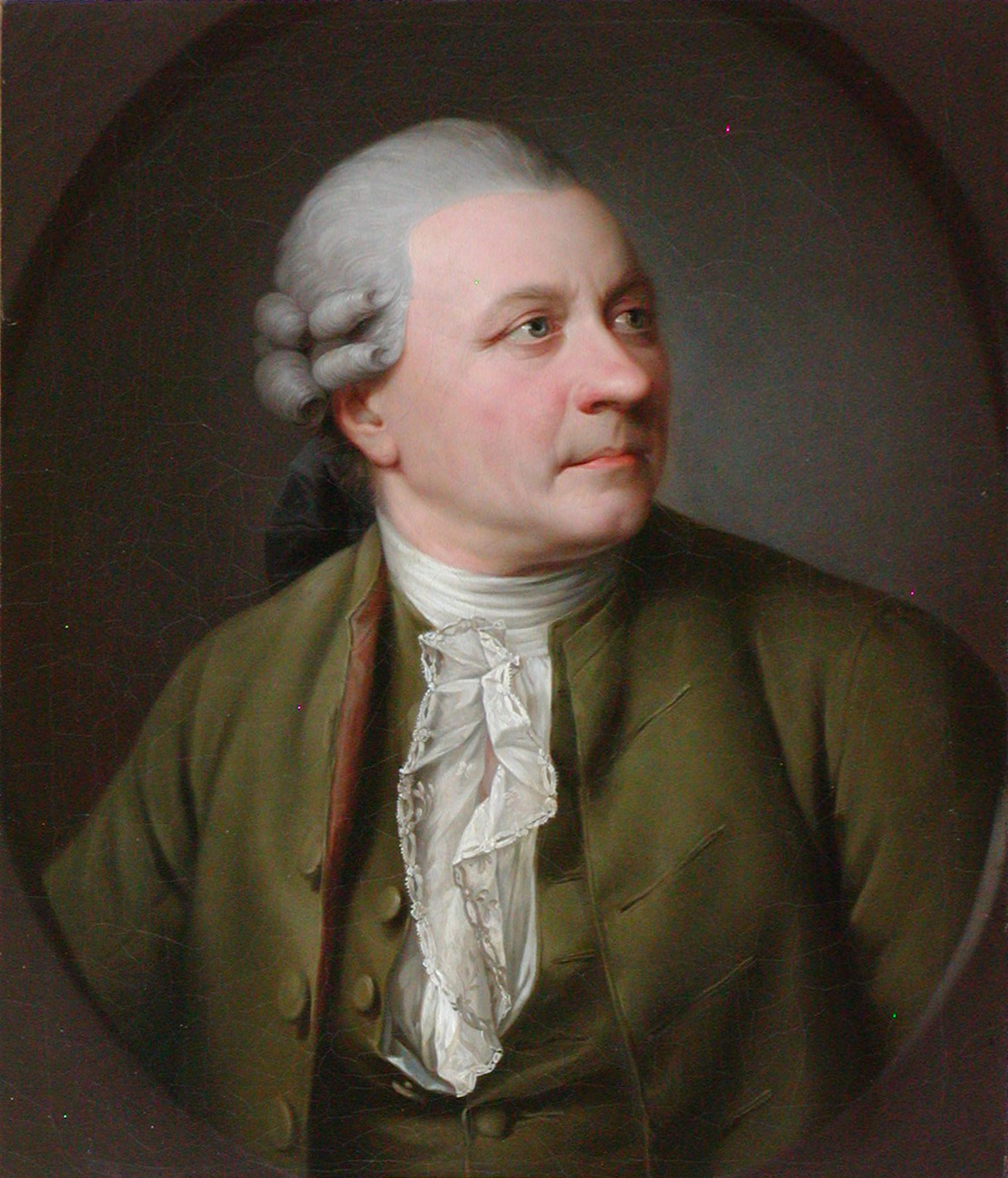
Friedrich Gottlieb Klopstock

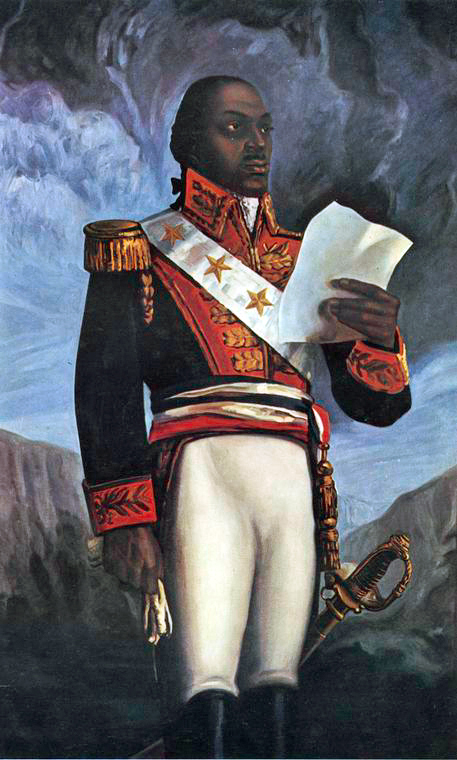
Toussaint Louverture

- January 1 – James Woodforde, English clergyman, diarist (b. 1740)
- January 18 – Ippolit Bogdanovich, Russian poet (b. 1743)
- January 23 – Arthur Guinness, Irish brewer (b. 1725)
- February 1 – Anders Chydenius, Finnish priest, politician (b. 1729)
- February 3 – María Isidra de Guzmán y de la Cerda, Spanish scholar (b. 1768)
- February 9 – Jean François de Saint-Lambert, French poet (b. 1716)
- February 11 – Jean-François de La Harpe, French critic (b. 1739)
- February 18 – Johann Wilhelm Ludwig Gleim, German poet (b. 1719)
- February 20 – Marie Dumesnil, French actress (b. 1713)
- February 22 – Jacques-Donatien Le Ray de Chaumont, French Father of the American Revolution (b. 1726)
- February 23 – Praskovia Kovalyova-Zhemchugova, Russian serf actress, opera soprano (b. 1768)
- February 21 – Edward Despard, British revolutionary (b. 1751)
- March 14 – Friedrich Gottlieb Klopstock, German poet (b. 1724)
- March 28 – Peter Du Cane, Sr., British businessman (b. 1713)
- April 2 – Sir James Montgomery, 1st Baronet, Scottish politician, judge (b. 1721)
- April 6 – William Hamilton, British diplomat, antiquary (b. 1730)
- April 7
  - Antoine de Bosc de la Calmette, Danish statesman, landscape architect (b. 1752)
  - Toussaint L'Ouverture, Haitian revolutionary (b. 1743)
- April 14 – Christoph Anton Migazzi, Austrian Catholic bishop (b. 1714)
- April 24 – Adélaïde Labille-Guiard, French portrait painter (b. 1749)
- May 8 – John Joseph Merlin, Belgian-born British clock- and musical-instrument-maker and inventor (b. 1735)
- May 29 – Louis-Antoine Caraccioli, French writer (b. 1719)
- June 24 – Matthew Thornton, American signer of the Declaration of Independence (b. 1714)
- June 26 – Fermín Lasuén, Spanish missionary (b. 1736)

=== July–December ===
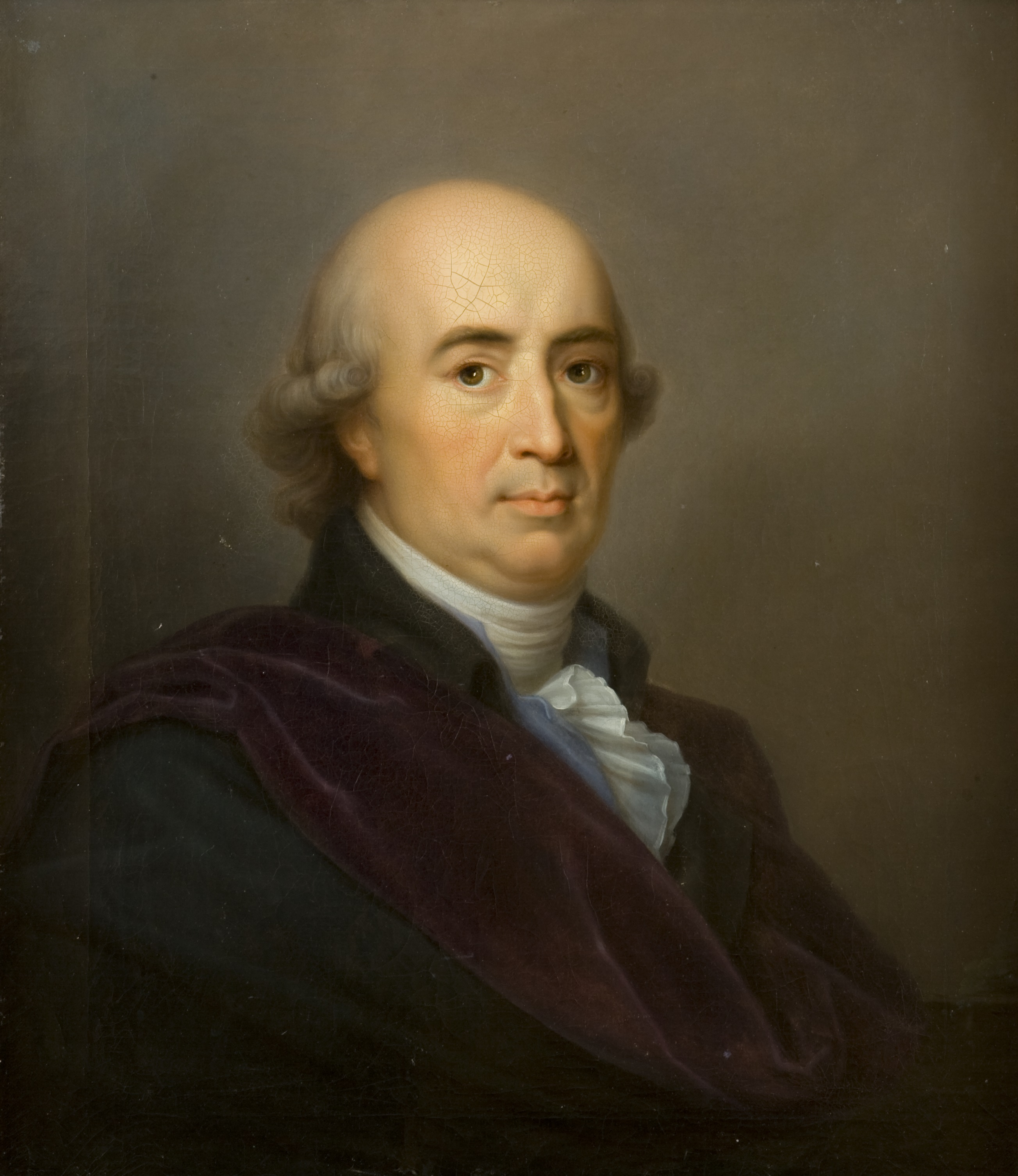
Johann Gottfried Herder

- August 24 – James Napper Tandy, Irish republican
- September 5 – Pierre Choderlos de Laclos, French general, author (b. 1741)
- September 13 – John Barry, officer in the Continental Navy during the American Revolutionary War, later in the United States Navy (b. 1745)
- September 15
  - Gian Francesco Albani, Italian Catholic cardinal (b. 1719)
  - François Devienne, French composer (b. 1759)
- September 16 – Nicolas Baudin, French explorer (b. 1754)
- September 17 – Franz Xaver Süssmayr, Austrian composer (b. 1766)
- September 23 – Joseph Ritson, English antiquary (b. 1752)
- September 27 – Frances Brett Hodgkinson, English-born American actress (b. 1771)
- October 2 – Samuel Adams, American revolutionary leader (b. 1722)
- October 8 – Vittorio Alfieri, Italian dramatist, poet (b. 1749)
- October 14 – Louis Claude de Saint-Martin, French philosopher (b. 1743)
- October 26 – Granville Leveson-Gower, 1st Marquess of Stafford, English politician (b. 1721)
- October 31 – Pandara Vanniyan, last King of Vanni (defeated by Lt. von Driberg)
- November 11 – Raphael Cohen, German rabbi (b. 1722)
- November 17 – John Willett Payne, British Royal Navy admiral (b. 1752)
- November 18 – Ditlevine Feddersen, Norwegian culture figure (b. 1727)
- November 25 – Joseph Wilton, English sculptor (b. 1722)
- December 7 – Gerrit Paape, Dutch politician, writer (b. 1752)
- December 15 – Dru Drury, English entomologist (b. 1725)
- December 18 – Johann Gottfried Herder, German philosopher, writer (b. 1744)
- December 26 – Gian Carlo Passeroni, Italian writer (b. 1713)
- December 30 – Francis Lewis, American signer of the Declaration of Independence (b. 1713)

=== Date unknown ===
- Moscho Tzavela, Greek-Souliote heroine (b. 1760)
