= Vanniar (Sri Lanka) =

Medieval Sri Lankan title

Vanniar or Vanniyar (Tamil: வன்னியர், romanized: vanniyar, Sinhala: වන්නියා, romanized: vanniyā) was a title borne by chiefs in medieval Sri Lanka who ruled in the Chiefdom of Vavuni regions as tribute payers who were incorporated into the Jaffna kingdom. There are a number of origin theories for the feudal chiefs, coming from an indigenous formation. The most famous of the Vavni chieftains was Pandara Vannian, known for his resistance against the British colonial power.

== Etymology ==
The word Vanni may have been a derivation of the Tamil word Vanam, meaning "forest", with Vanniar meaning "person from the forest".

== History ==
Medieval Tamil chronicles such as the 18th-century Yalpana Vaipava Malai and stone inscriptions like Konesar Kalvettu recount that the Chola royal Kankan, a descendant of the legendary King Manu Needhi Cholan, restored the Koneswaram temple at Trincomalee and the Kantalai tank after finding them in ruins. He visited the Munneswaram temple on the west coast, before settling ancient Vanniars in the east of the island. According to the chronicles, he extensively renovated and expanded the shrine, lavishing much wealth on it; he was crowned with the epithet Kulakottan meaning Builder of tank and temple.

Further to the reconstruction, Kulakottan paid attention to agricultural cultivation and economic development in the area, inviting the Vanniar chief Tanniuna Popalen and families to a new founded town in the area Thampalakamam to maintain the Kantalai tank and the temple itself. The effects of this saw the Vanni region flourish. The Vanniars were brought here by this chief to make them cultivate in this region.

Following the re-rise of the Tamil kingdom in the medieval period and demise of the Rajarata kingdom period after the twelfth century AD, many petty chiefs took power in the buffer lands between the northern-based Independant Jaffna Kingdom and other kingdoms based on the southwest of the island – namely Kotte Kingdom and the Kandyan Kingdom. These petty chiefs paid tribute to the Jaffna Vassal State. Sometimes they were independent of any central control or subdued by the southern kingdoms during the European colonial era for strategical purposes. The ruling class was composed of multi-caste origins.

The Vannimai ruling class arose from a multi-ethnic and multi-caste background Some scholars conclude the Vanniyar title as a rank of a local chieftain which was introduced by the Velaikkarar mercenaries of the Chola dynasty. There were also number of Vannia chiefs of Sinhalese ancestry. Many kings and chiefs with titles such as Vannia had ruled in northern areas of modern Sri Lanka termed as Vanni Nadu or Vannimai during the Jaffna Vassal State era.

As a title, it is no longer registered amongst northern Sri Lankan Tamils but in the 1900s it was present singly in the North and North Central provinces. It was recorded as the name of a separate caste in the North Western part of Ceylon in the census of 1871.
