= Vanni chieftaincies =

Chieftaincies in Sri Lanka

- 13th century
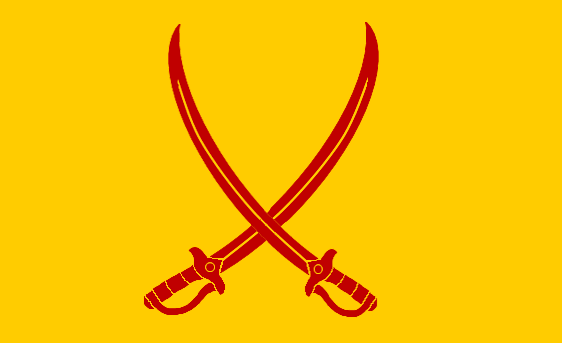
- Flag of Pandara Vanniyan

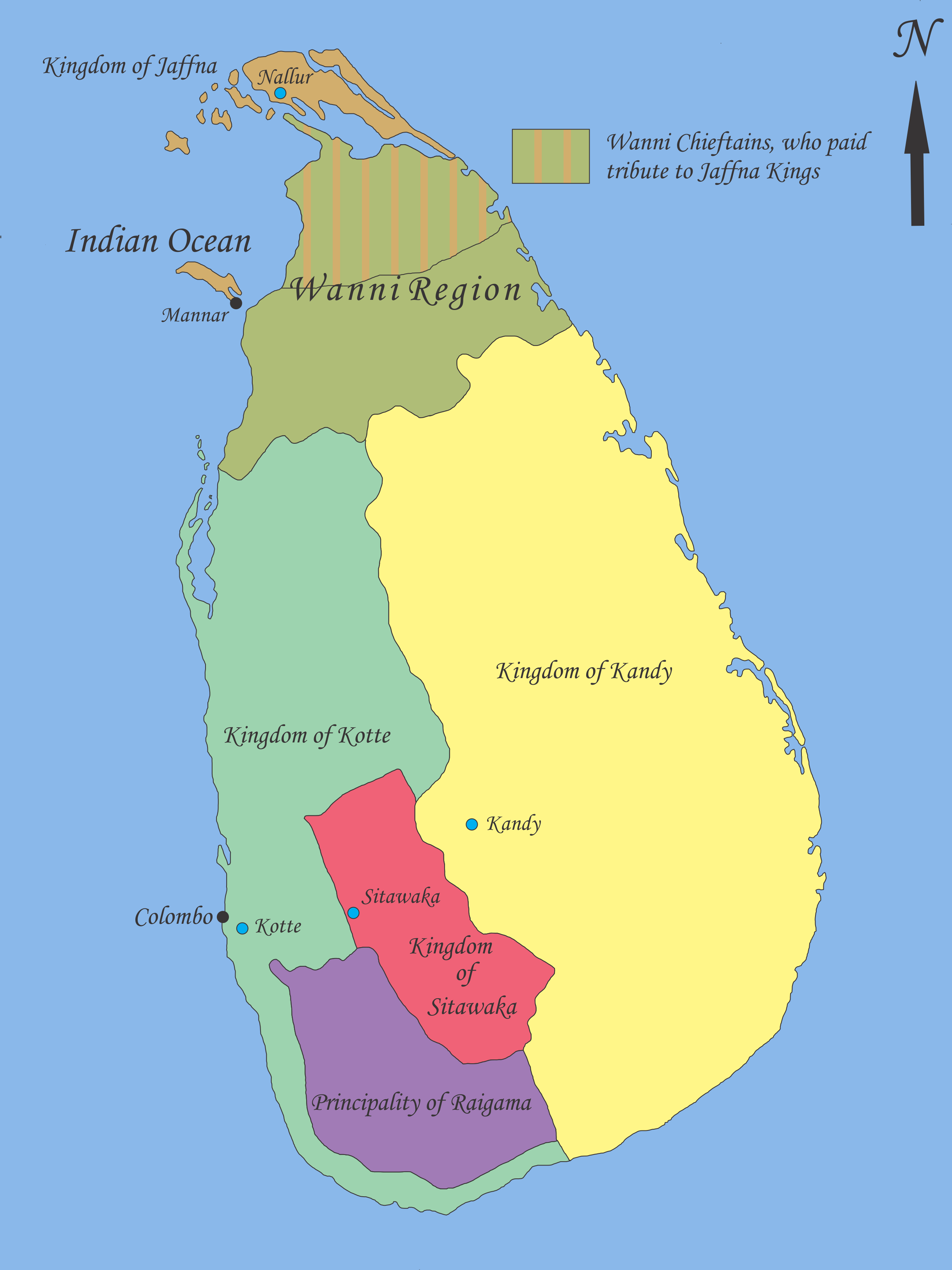
- Sri Lanka in the 1520s
- Government: Chiefdom
- Historical era: Transitional period
  - Māgha's invasion of Polonnaruwa: 13th century
  - Vanniyar Rebellion: 1782
Preceded by	Succeeded by
Kingdom of Polonnaruwa	British Ceylon

The Vanni chieftaincies or Vanni tribes was a region between Anuradhapura and Jaffna, but also extending to along the eastern coast to Panama and Yala, during the Transitional and Kandyan periods of Sri Lanka. The heavily forested land was a collection of chieftaincies of principalities that were a collective buffer zone between the Jaffna Kingdom, in the north of Sri Lanka, and the Sinhalese kingdoms in the south. Traditionally the forest regions were ruled by Vedda rulers. Later on, the emergence of these chieftaincies was a direct result of the breakdown of central authority and the collapse of the Kingdom of Polonnaruwa in the 13th century, as well as the establishment of the Jaffna Kingdom in the Jaffna Peninsula. Control of this area was taken over by dispossessed Sinhalese nobles and chiefs of the South Indian military of Māgha of Kalinga (1215–1236), whose 1215 invasion of Polonnaruwa led to the kingdom's downfall. Sinhalese chieftaincies would lay on the northern border of the Sinhalese kingdom while the Tamil chieftaincies would border the Jaffna Kingdom and the remoter areas of the eastern coast, north western coast outside of the control of either kingdom.

The chieftains, who were known as Vanniars, would function like feudal lords in their territories. During much of the Transitional period when the island was politically unstable, depending on the situation at the time, the chieftains would owe their allegiance to one or the other kingdom. They offered military protection to those who came under their authority. Vanniars referred to a broad category of people who could have been appointees of the Sinhalese kings, who administered outlying districts or autonomous rulers of large, sparsely populated and undeveloped lands. The Vanniars in general paid tribute to the Kingdom of Kotte and later to the Kingdom of Kandy, apart from Confederation of Northern Tamil Vanniars paid tribute to the Jaffna Kingdom until it collapsed.

== Vanniar ==
Vanniar or Vanniyar was a title used by tribute-paying feudal chiefs in medieval Sri Lanka. It was also recorded as the name of a caste of Mukkuvars amongst Sri Lankan Tamils in the Vanni District of northern Sri Lanka during the early 1900s.

=== Origin theories ===
The Vannimai ruling class arose from a multi-ethnic and multi-caste background. According to primary sources such as the Yalpana Vaipava Malai, they were of Mukkuvar, Karaiyar, Vellalar and other caste origins. Some scholars conclude the Vanniyar title as a rank of a local chieftain which was introduced by the Velaikkarar mercenaries of the Chola dynasty.

Some Sri Lankan historians derive the title Vannimai from the Tamil word vanam, meaning "forest", with Vannia or Wannia meaning "person from the forest", and Vannimais being large tracts of forested land.

=== Feudal chiefs ===
Tamil chronicles such as the 18th-century Yalpana Vaipava Malai and stone inscriptions like the Konesar Kalvettu recount that the Chola royal Kankan, a descendant of the legendary King Manu Needhi Cholan of Thiruvarur, Chola Nadu, restored the Koneswaram temple at Trincomalee and the Kantalai tank after finding them in ruins. Kankan visited the Munneswaram temple on the west coast of Sri Lanka, before settling in the east of the island. According to the chronicles, he extensively renovated and expanded the shrine; he was crowned with the ephitet Kulakottan, meaning Builder of Tank and Temple. In addition to this reconstruction, Kulakottan paid attention to agriculture cultivation and economic development in the area, inviting the Vanniar chief Tanniuna Popalen and other families to a newly founded town in the Thampalakamam area to maintain the Kantalai tank and the temple itself. As a result of his policies, the Vanni region flourished. The Vanniar claim descent from this chief. Modern historians and anthropologists agree as historically factual the connection of the Vanniars with the Konesar temple, and some cite epigraphical evidence to date Kullakottan's renovations to 432-440 AD. Others cite poetic and inscriptional evidence to date his renovations to as early as 1589 BC.

After the re-rise of the Tamil kingdoms and the demise of the Rajarata after the twelfth century AD, many petty chiefs took power in the buffer lands between the northern Jaffna Kingdom and the southern kingdoms of Kotte and Kandy. These petty chefs paid tribute to the Jaffna Kingdom. Sometimes they were independent of any central control, or were subdued by the southern kingdoms for strategic advantages, before eventually being restored. Many kings and chiefs with titles such as Vannian or Vannia ruled in northern areas of modern Sri Lanka during the Jaffna era. Some of the Vanni chieftains were immigrants from southern India, and ruled over a populace known as rate-atto in Sinhalese. The Vanni chieftains ruled following local custom, supported by a coterie of local officials. Their rule had a noticeable influence on the language of the local populace.

== Northern chieftaincies ==
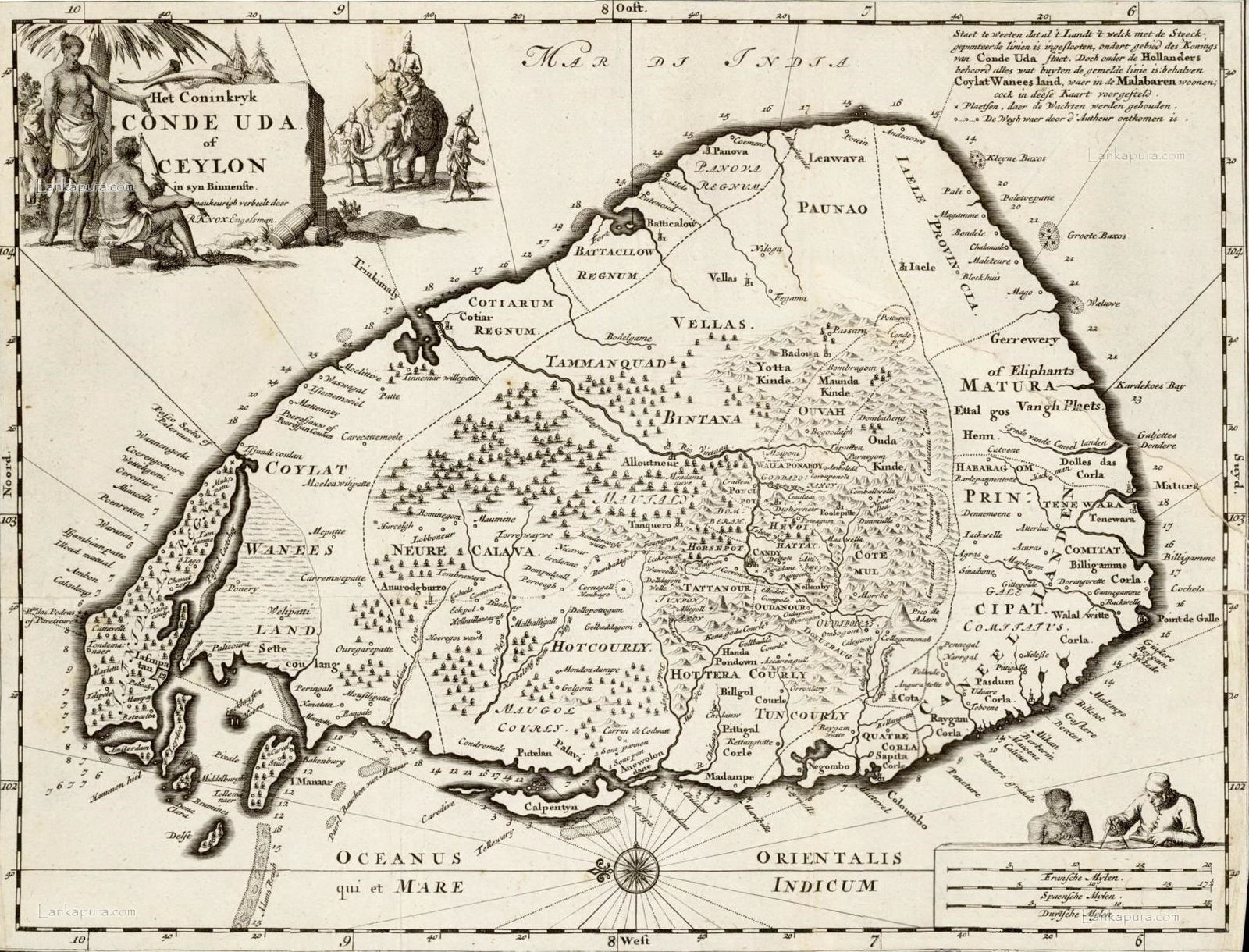
1692 engraving by Wilhem Broedelet of Robert Knox's 1681 map of northern Sri Lanka.

Among the medieval Vanni chieftaincies, those of Panankamam, Melpattu, Mulliyavalai, Karunavalpattu, Karrikattumulai, Tennamaravadi and Trincomalee in the north of the island were incorporated into the Jaffna Kingdom. Hence the Tamil Vanni just south of the Jaffna Peninsula and in the eastern Trincomalee district is ruled by Confederacy of Vanni rulers usually paid an annual tribute to the northern kingdom instead of taxes. The tribute was in cash, grains, honey, elephants, and ivory. The annual tribute system was enforced due to the greater distance from Jaffna. The arrival of the Portuguese to the island caused a brief loss of some of Jaffna's territory. Queirós, an historian of Portuguese origin, says of the Jaffna kingdom:

"This modest kingdom is not confined to the little district of Jaffnapatnam because to it are also added the neighboring lands and those of the Vanni which is said to be name of the lordship which they held before we obtained pocession of them, separated from the proceeding by a salty river and connected only in the extremity or isthmus of Pachalapali within which the lands of Baligamo, Bedamarache and Pachalapali forming that peninsula and outside of it stretch the lands of Vanni. Crosswise, from the side of Mannar to that of Triquillemele, being separated also from the country of Mantota in the jurisdiction of Captain of Mannar by the river Paragali; which ends in the river of the Cross in the midst of the lands of Vanni and of others which stretch as far as Triquillemele which according to the map appears to be a large tract of country".

which indicated the kings of Jaffna just prior to capitulation to the Portuguese had jurisdiction over an area corresponding to the modern Northern Province of Sri Lanka and parts of the northern half of the eastern province and that the Portuguese claimed these based on their conquest. Following Portuguese defeat by the Dutch, the Mannar, Jaffna islands and the Vanni lands were reincorporated into the Tamil Coylot Wannees Country by the early 18th century.

== Western and Eastern chieftaincies ==
Vannimais in the Batticalao and Puttalam districts were under the control of chiefs of Mukkuvar origin. Puttalam was under Jaffna kingdom sovereignty in the 14th century, where it served as the second capital of the kingdom during the pearl fishing season. With the strengthening of Portuguese influence in the Kandyan and Kotte kingdoms, Vannimais in the eastern Batticaloa and Ampara districts came under the nominal control of the Kandyan Kingdom after the sixteenth century, although they had considerable autonomy under their chiefs. The Vanni Chieftaincy in the Puttalam districts came under the control of Kotte Kingdom.

== Bibliography ==
- Codrington, H. W. (1926). A Short History Of Ceylon. London: Macmillan & Co.
- de Silva, K. M. (1981). A History of Sri Lanka. University of California Press. ISBN 9780520043206.
- de Silva, K. M. (2005). A History of Sri Lanka. Colombo: Vijitha Yapa Publications. ISBN 9789558095928.
- McGilvray, Dennis (1982). Mukkuvar Vannimai: Tamil Caste and Matriclan Ideology in Batticaloa, Sri Lanka, (Caste Ideology and Interaction). Cambridge University Press.
- Kartithigesu, Sivathamby (1995). Sri Lankan Tamil society and politics. New Century Book House. p. 189. ISBN 81-234-0395-X.
- Pathmanathan, Sivasubramaniam (2006). Hindu Temples of Sri Lanka. Kumaran Book House. ISBN 955-9429-91-4.
- Peebles, Patrick (2006). The History of Sri Lanka. United States: Greenwood Press. p. 248. ISBN 0-313-33205-3.
- Gunasingam, Murugar (1999). Sri Lankan Tamil nationalism. Sydney: MV. p. 238. ISBN 0-646-38106-7.
