= Friedrich Wilhelm von Driberg =

Colonel Friedrich Wilhelm von Driberg
- Born: 1764; Stadt Hannover, Niedersachen, Holy Roman Empire
- Died: 6 July 1807; Jaffna, Northern Province, Sri Lanka

Colonel Friedrich Wilhelm von Driberg was Commandant of Mullaitivu whilst in the Dutch colonial forces and Captain of the mercenary military for the Dutch East India Company in Ceylon. He is known for killing Pandara Vanniyan in battle on 31 October 1803 in Sri Lanka (formerly Ceylon).

== Personal life ==
Colonel von Driberg was the son of Diedrich Carolus von Driberg and Johanna Maria Martina Aubert, and brother of: Wilhelmina Anjou von Driberg; Lieutenant Johan Carrel Christian von Driberg; and Jacoba Christina von Driberg.

He married Susanna Petronella Jacoba Tarée with whom he had children:

1 Theodora Elizabeth Rudolphina von Driberg who married Dr Abraham White, with issue;

2 Lieutenant Fredrick Jacob von Driberg;

3 Lieutenant Pierre Fredrick Henry von Driberg;

4 Major William Johan von Driberg;

5 Charlotte Caroline von Driberg, who married Toriano.

== Career ==
Colonel von Driberg stayed on in Ceylon even after the British ousted the Dutch. It has been noted that von Driberg felt humiliated by Pandara Vanniyan for having been defeated by him several times in battle, including in a personal combat situation.
