= Pandara Vanniyan =

- Tamil Vanniar (Chieftain) of Vannimai 'The Last King of Vanni'
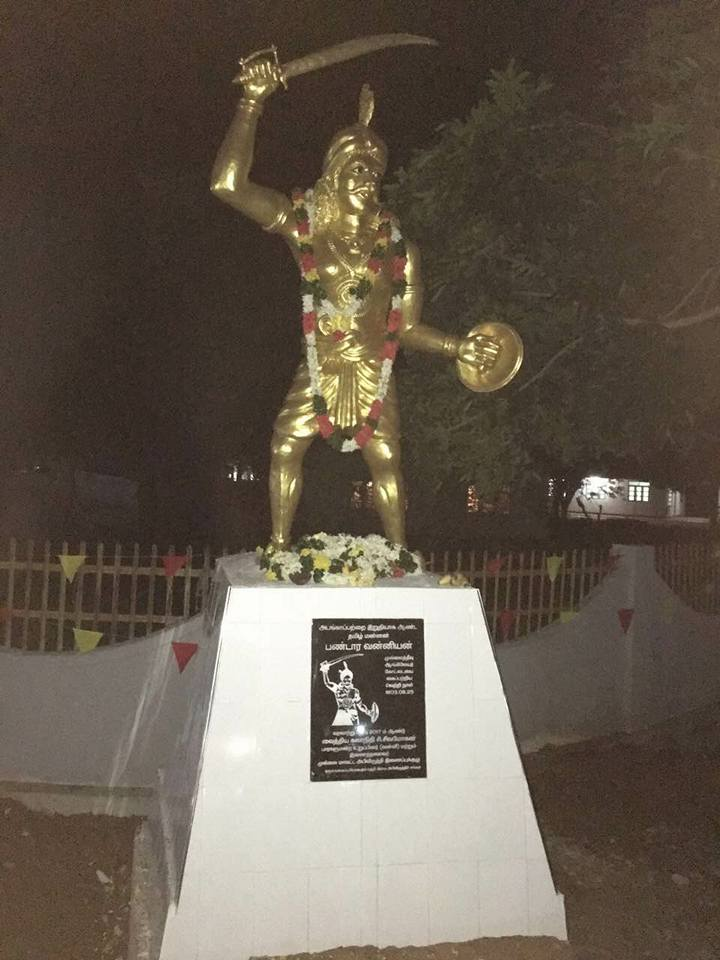
- Pandara Vanniyan statue
- Reign: 1785–1803
- Successor: British rule
- Born: ~1775; Vanni, Sri Lanka
- Died: 31 October, 1810 (Succumbed to injuries from ambush by British forces); Katsilaimadu, Sri Lanka
Names
- Kulasegaram Vairamuthu Kumaran
- Religion: Hinduism

Pandara Vanniyan (Tamil: பண்டார வன்னியன், romanized: Paṇṭāra Vaṉṉiyaṉ, Sinhala: වන්නි බණ්ඩාර, romanized: Vanni Baṇḍāra) was a Tamil Chieftain who ruled in Vanni Nadu reigned from 1785 - 1803 in 18th century AD and early 19th century AD. He is referred to by some as the last Tamil king in Sri Lanka, who also rose to revolt against the British Ceylon empire and Dutch Ceylon empire, who died battling the British colonial rule on the island. He was officially declared a National Hero of Sri Lanka in 1982.

== Biography ==
Kulasegaram Vairamuthu Pandara Vanniyan was a native of Vanni. The 'Vanniyan' here is different from the caste of the same name. Much remains unclear about his family, but reports state that he had one sister, Nallanachal Vanniyan, and two younger brothers called Kayilaya Vanniyan (Minister) and Periya Meynaar (Commander of the State). Pandara Vanniyan married Kumarasinghe Maha Vanniya's family of present day Nuwara Wewa, who held the office of residential Governor and Custodian of the formerly Tamil area. Marriages between Vanniar Chieftain families in the northern and southern regions helped to unite and strengthen rule. Thus, when Pandara Vanniyan married into the Nuwara Wewa family, he gained political power in the south Vanni as well as in the north. It is said that he lived in Kumulamunai, which today is in Mullaitivu District. His statue of honour is located in Jaffna.

== History ==
Vanniar chieftain, Pandara Vanniyan, appeared to have paid some tribute to the more powerful rulers in the region at that time, who had an independent spirit and a distinct culture and dialect of their own. Vanni functioned as a buffer zone between the north and the south of Sri Lanka. Historically, the Vanni encompassed Mannar, Vavuniya, Trincomalee, Polonnaruwa, Batticaloa, Ampara and Puttalam hinterlands.

The beginnings of the people of the Vanni (Vanniar), who were ruled over by Vanniar Chieftains, has not been clearly established, but there is evidence of settlements in the region dating back 2000 years. Furthermore, there is information on the Konesar Kalvettu and in the old 'Vya' song of sixty Vanniar coming from Madurai in South India, accompanying the royal bride for the king at Anuradhapura in the first century BC.

== Conflict with colonial rule ==
When the Jaffna Kingdom was captured by the Portuguese in 1621, the Vanni was under their nominal control and it is thought that 'Parangichetticulam' of the Vanni is the former fort of the Portuguese.

Around 1782, the continued conflicts came to an end when the Dutch, who had by then arrived in Sri Lanka, once and for all defeated the Vanniars. It has been noted that "The Dutch met nowhere a more determined resistance than from one of the native princesses, the Vannichi (widow) Maria Sembatte, whom they [carried] away as prisoner, and [detained] in captivity in the Fort of Colombo."

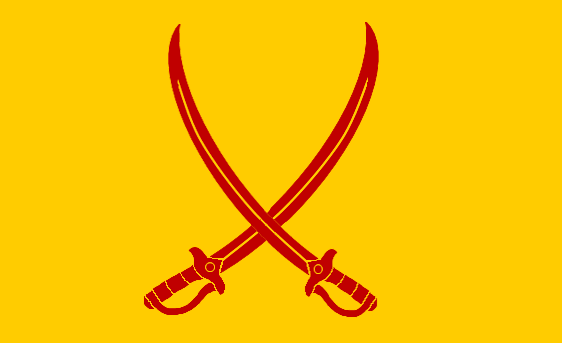
The Flag of Pandara Vanniyan

Pandara Vanniyan has defeated the Dutch several times by defeating the Lt. von Driberg several times.Pandara Vanniyan fought against the British colonial powers. The Vanniars commenced to live a wild and marauding life and carried on a predatory warfare against the British in Mannar and Trincomalee, and even penetrated to the Jaffna Peninsula. The British had to build forts along the river to keep them at bay. In alliance with the Kandy Kingdom, Vanniyan started a revolt to expel the British from his district. On 25 August 1803, Vanniyan attacked the Government House in Mullaitheevu and drove out the garrison from Mullaitheevu, which was under the command of Captain Edward Mudge of the 19th Regiment, before finally seizing the fort.

Pandara Vannian captured the British cannons and overran the whole of the northern districts (Vanni), highlighting his boldness and ability to penetrate as far as Elephant Pass and into the Jaffna Peninsula. From conventional warfare, Pandara Vannian resorted to guerrilla tactics, but was finally defeated by Lt. von Driberg when the (recently arrived) British organized a three-pronged attack from Jaffna, Mannar and Trincomalee in 1803. In that battle, the British also captured the cannon given to Pandara Vanniyan by Sri Wickrema Rajasinghe. The British presented the village of Pandara Kulam to Lt. von Driberg as a prize for defeating Pandara Vanniyan.

This was followed by the "burning of all his houses, [whereby Pandara Vanniyan's] people ... dispersed into the jungle, and eventually out of the Vanni to the districts of Hanwella. The power of the Vanniar (Chieftains) was thus finally and effectually extinguished." Alternative histories have it that Lt. von Driberg of the Dutch forces felt humiliated by Pandara Vanniyan for having been defeated by him several times, including in a personal combat situation; despite being permitted by senior officials to withdraw, he stayed on even after the British ousted the Dutch.

== Death ==
Pandara Vanniyan was defeated in battle at the hands of Lt. von Driberg, in October 1803 at Oddusuddan, Katsilaimadu. Now no longer a feudal ruler, he withdrew to areas near the Kandy Kingdom. He remained there until September 1810 where he was attacked in an ambush by British forces, and later succumbed to his injuries. A granite stone monument commemorating Vanniyan's defeat was erected in the village Katsilaimadu in Vanni; it was placed in tribute by Lt. von Driberg, who had fought him in battle. The monument bears the inscription: "Here abouts Captain von Driberg Defeated Pandara Vawniyan Oct 31 st 1803." In 2010 it was found broken; some Tamil media outlets reported that it had been damaged by Sinhalese soldiers in light of recent ethnic tensions and criticized it as an act of destruction of Tamil heritage and culture.

== Legacy ==
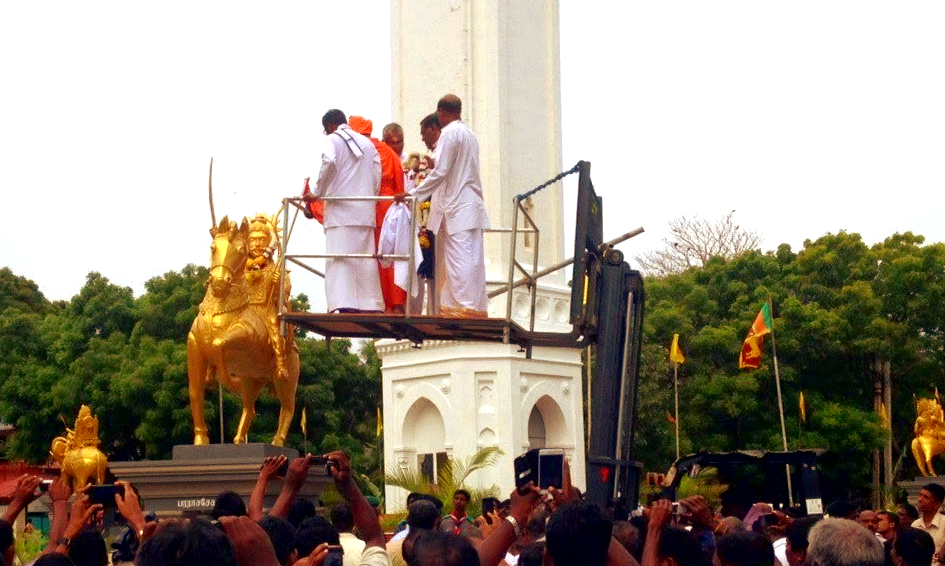
Statue of Pandara Vanniyan, unveiled 10 August 2014.

Pandara Vanniyan was declared a national hero by the Prime Minister, Ranasinghe Premadasa in 1982 and a statue of him was opened with much fanfare in Vavuniya at the main junction on the A-9 Highway, where the Jaffna and Kandy (and Colombo) road meets the road to Mannar. The Pandara Vanniyan Memorial Day falls on 25 August each year.

Present-day Tamils and Sinhalese of North Central and North Western provinces in Sri Lanka, which were once part of Vanni, revere Pandara Vanniyan highly. The Sinhalese are known to summon the protection of Vanni Bandara Deio when they pass through jungles.

Tamil nationalists valourise Vanniyan as an epic hero, and his character has recently been appropriated and measured against Vellupillai Prabhakaran, the leader of the now dismantled Liberation Tigers of Tamil Eelam (LTTE). 'Kalaignar' M. Karunanidhi, in his novel 'Payum Puli Pandara Vanniyan' ('The Leaping Tiger Pandara Vanniyan' in English), uses Vanniyan to typify Tamil patriotism and transnationalism. According to Vijaya Ramaswamy in Historical Dictionary of the Tamils, "the course of the novel is ... connected to ... developments in Sri Lanka related to moves by the LTTE. The novel describes the mission of a friend of Veerapandiya Kattabomman (the last Poligar who resisted British rule in Tamil Nadu) to the Wanni jungles in Sri Lanka. His mission was to meet Pandara Vanniyan who was also resisting the British. This part of the novel echoes the meeting of V. Gopalsamy MP (popularly known as Vaiko) and Vellupillai Prabhakaran (leader of the defunct LTTE) in the dense jungles of Wanni."

Pandara Vanniyan is also the subject of the eponymous play by Mullaimaṇi Ve Cuppiramaṇiyam, 'Pantara Vanniyan.' The play was awarded a prize by the Ceylon Art Council in 1964, and was published thereafter in 1970.

On 10 August 2014, three statues of former Tamil kings including Pandara Vanniyan, Ellalan, and Pararaja Sekaran were installed by Jaffna Clock Tower.
