= Kantale =

Kantale කන්තලේ கந்தளாய்
- Town
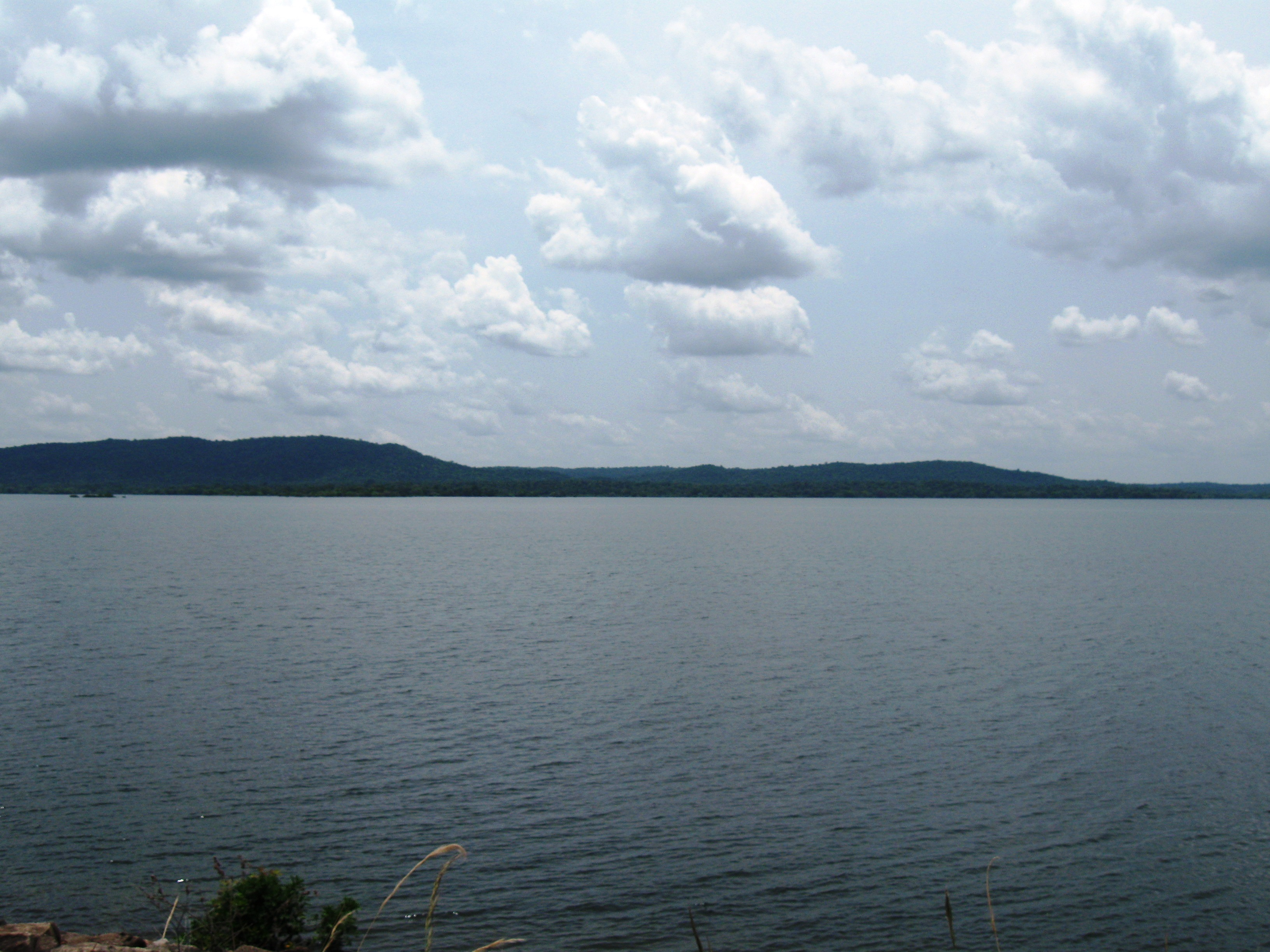
- Kantalai Tank
- Location in Sri Lanka
- Coordinates: 8°22′06″N 81°01′41″E
- Country: Sri Lanka
- Province: Eastern Province
- District: Trincomalee District
- Time zone: UTC+5:30 (Time in Sri Lanka)
- Postal code: 31300
- Area code: 026

Kantale (Sinhala: කන්තලේ, romanized: Kantalē; Tamil: கந்தளாய், romanized: Kantaḷāy) is a town in the Trincomalee District in eastern Sri Lanka. The town is located 38 km (24 mi) south-west of Trincomalee.

According to the ancient chronicle, Mahavamsa, Kantale Tank, also named "Gangathala Wapi", is credited as being built by Aggabodhi II (606–618) and rehabilitated and developed by Parakramabahu the Great (1153–1186). 3,750 hectares. Constructed for the irrigation of crops in this arid region, its source of water is the Mahaweli River, the longest in the island, which flows out to the sea at Trincomalee.

One of the oldest tanks in Sri Lanka, the Kantale Tank gives water to a vast area for paddy and sugar cane plantations as well as for human consumption in Trincomalee and the adjoining areas.

== See also ==
- Kantale Hospital
