= Kantale Hospital =

- Ministry of Health, Sri Lanka

Geography
- Location: Kantale, Trincomalee District, Eastern Province, Sri Lanka
- Coordinates: 8°22′00.90″N 81°00′15.90″E

Organisation
- Care system: Public

Services
- Beds: 210

Links
- Lists: Hospitals in Sri Lanka

Kantale Hospital is a government hospital in Kantale, Sri Lanka. It is controlled by the central government in Colombo. As of 2010 it had 210 beds. The hospital is sometimes called Kantale Base Hospital.
