= Kantale Dam =

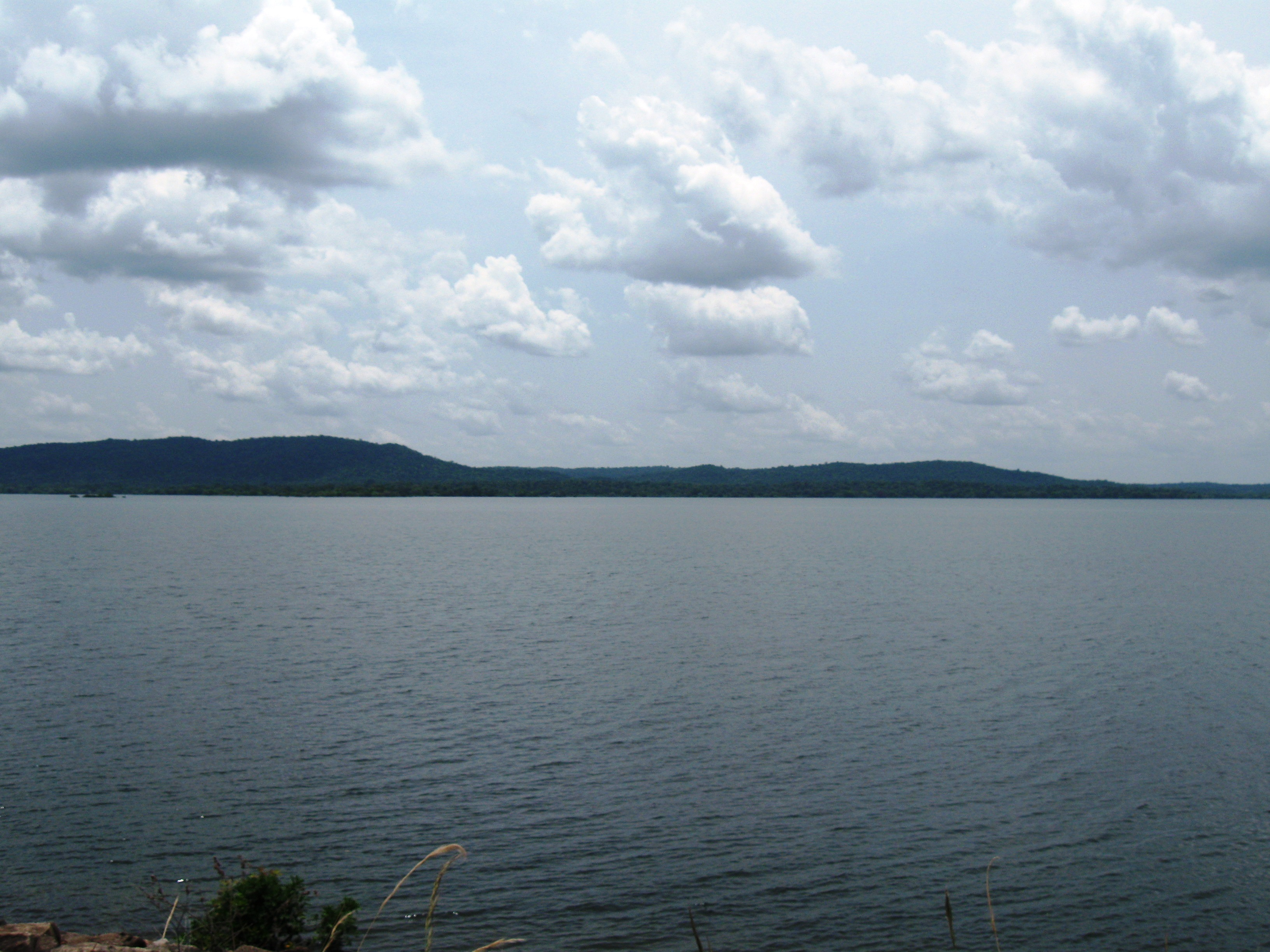
- Kantale Tank in May 2015

- Location within Sri Lanka
- Country: Sri Lanka
- Location: Kantale
- Coordinates: 08°21′40″N 80°59′29″E
- Purpose: Irrigation
- Status: Operational
- Owner: Mahaweli Authority

Dam and spillways
- Type of dam: Embankment dam
- Impounds: Per Aru
- Height (foundation): 50 ft (15 m)
- Length: 14,000 ft (4,267 m)

Reservoir
- Creates: Kantale Reservoir

The Kantale Dam (Sinhala: කන්තලේ වැව, romanized: Kantaḷe Wewa, Tamil: கந்தளாய் அணை, romanized: Kantaḷāy Aṇai) is a large embankment dam built in Kantale, Trincomalee District, Sri Lanka. It is 14,000 ft (4,267 m) long, and over 50 ft (15 m) high. The dam, used for irrigation, breached on 20 April 1986, killing more than 120 people. It has since been reconstructed. The dam impounds the Per Aru, a small river discharging into the Koddiyar Bay, at Trincomalee Harbour.

== Reservoir history ==
The tank was built by King Aggabodhi ll of Anuradhapura (604-614 AD) and further developed by King Parakramabahu the Great. It was also known as Gangathala Vapi at the time. The reservoir has a catchment area of 216 km^{2} (83 mi^{2}) and a capacity of 135 million cubic metres (4.8×10^{9} ft^{3}).

== 1986 dam failure ==
On 20 April 1986 at 03:00 AM, the dam breached, sending a wall of water over the villages downstream. The floods killed approximately 120–180 people, destroyed over 1,600 houses and 2,000 acres (810 ha) of paddy, affecting over 8,000 families. One of the main causes of the breach was said to be due to extra-heavy vehicles being driven over the dam.
