= 1st Northern Provincial Council =

Overview
- Legislative body: Northern Provincial Council
- Jurisdiction: Northern Province, Sri Lanka
- Meeting place: Provincial Council Assembly Hall, Northern Provincial Council Building, Kaithady
- Term: 25 October 2013
- Website: np.gov.lk

Provincial councillors
- Members: 38
- Chairman: C. V. K. Sivagnanam (ITAK)
- Deputy Chairman: V. Kamaleswaran
- Chief Minister: C. V. Vigneswaran (ITAK)
- Leader of the Opposition: S. Thavarajah (EPDP)
- Party control: Tamil National Alliance

The 1st Northern Provincial Council is the current meeting of the Northern Provincial Council, with the membership determined by the results of the 2013 provincial council election held on 21 September 2013. The council met for the first time on 25 October 2013. According to the Constitution of Sri Lanka the maximum term of a provincial council is 5 years from the date of its first meeting.

== Election ==
The 1st Northern Provincial Council election was held on 21 September 2013. The Tamil National Alliance (TNA), the largest party representing the Sri Lankan Tamils, won 30 of the 38 seats. The United People's Freedom Alliance (UPFA), which was in power nationally, became the second largest group after winning 7 seats. The Sri Lanka Muslim Congress (SLMC) won the remaining seat.

=== Results ===
Alliance	Votes	%	Seats
Tamil National Alliance	353,595	78.48%	30
United People's Freedom Alliance	82,838	18.38%	7
Sri Lanka Muslim Congress	6,761	1.50%	1
Others	7,380	1.64%	0
Total	450,574	100.00%	38

The new provincial council met for the first time on 25 October 2013. C. V. K. Sivagnanam (TNA-ITAK) and Anton Jeyanathan (TNA-ITAK) were elected unopposed as Chairman and Deputy Chairman respectively.

== Government/Board of Ministers ==
C. V. Vigneswaran was appointed Chief Minister by Governor G. A. Chandrasiri on 1 October 2013. Vigneswaran took his oath as chief minister and provincial councillor in front of President Mahinda Rajapaksa at the Presidential Secretariat on 7 October 2013. The four other ministers took their oaths in front of Vigneswaran at Veerasingam Hall on 11 October 2013: P. Ayngaranesan (TNA-EPRLF); B. Deniswaran (TNA-TELO); T. Kurukularajah (TNA-ITAK); and P. Sathiyalingam (TNA-ITAK).

== Deaths and resignations ==
The 1st provincial council saw the following deaths and resignations:

- 7 April 2014: K. Kamalendran (UPFA-JAF) forfeited his seat after ceasing to be a member of the UPFA. He was replaced by S. Thavarajah (UPFA-JAF) on 9 April 2014.
- 17 February 2015: K. Swami Veerabahu (TNA-MUL) died. He was replaced by K. Sivanesan (TNA-MUL) on 30 April 2015.
- 18 February 2015: Mary Kamala Gunaseelan (TNA-BON) resigned. Her replacement M. P. Nadarajah (TNA-BON) was sworn in on 7 April 2015.
- 25 August 2015: D. Siddarthan (TNA-JAF) and S. Sivamohan (TNA-MUL) forfeited their seat after being elected to Parliament. Their replacements, K. Tharmalingam (TNA-JAF) and V. Kamaleswaran (TNA-MUL), were sworn in on 18 September 2015.
- 10 September 2015: Angajan Ramanathan (UPFA-JAF) forfeited his seat after being appointed to Parliament. He was replaced by S. Agilathas (UPFA-JAF) on 24 September 2015.
- 11 May 2016: M. P. Nadarajah (TNA-BON) resigned. He was replaced by S. Mayuran (TNA-BON) on 5 July 2016.
- 1 October 2016: Anton Jeyanathan (TNA-MUL) died. He was replaced by A. Povaneswaran (TNA-MUL) on 9 December 2016.
- 2017: S. Mayuran (TNA-BON) resigned. His replacement R. Jeyasekaram (TNA-BON) was sworn in on 2 August 2017.
- 6 October 2017: Rifkhan Bathiudeen (UPFA-MAN) resigned. He was replaced by Alikhan Shariff.
- 14 December 2017: E. Arnold (TNA-JAF) resigned. He was replaced by Sabaratnam Kugathas.
- December 2017: S. M. Rasik (SLMC-MAN) resigned. He was replaced by A. N. S. Mohamed.

== Members ==
Name	District	Preference Votes	Member From	Member To	Elected Party	Elected Alliance	Current Party	Current Alliance	Notes
S. Agilathas	JAF	2,482	24 September 2015		SLFP	UPFA	SLFP	UPFA	Replaces Angajan Ramanathan.
P. Ariyaratnam	KIL	27,264	11 October 2013		ITAK	TNA	ITAK	TNA	
E. Arnold	JAF	26,888	11 October 2013	14 December 2017	ITAK	TNA	ITAK	TNA	Replaced by Sabaratnam Kugathas.
Ayub Asmin	BON	1,009	11 October 2013		PMGG	TNA	PMGG	TNA	
P. Ayngaranesan	JAF	22,268	11 October 2013		EPRLF	TNA	EPRLF	TNA	Minister of Agriculture(13-17).
Rifkhan Bathiudeen	MAN	11,130	17 October 2013	6 October 2017	ACMC	UPFA	ACMC	UPFA	Replaced by Alikhan Shariff.
A. L. Y. J. Cassim	MUL	1,726	17 October 2013		ACMC	UPFA	ACMC	UPFA	
B. Deniswaran	MAN	12,828	11 October 2013		TELO	TNA	TELO	TNA	Minister of Fisheries (13-17).
B. Gajatheepan	JAF	29,669	11 October 2013		ITAK	TNA	ITAK	TNA	
G. Gunaseelan	MAN	12,260	14 October 2013		TELO	TNA	TELO	TNA	Minister of Health (17-).
Mary Kamala Gunaseelan	BON		11 October 2013	18 February 2015	TULF	TNA	TULF	TNA	Replaced by M. P. Nadarajah.
R. Indrarajah	VAV	11,535	18 October 2013		EPRLF	TNA	EPRLF	TNA	
Annihamyge Jayathilaka	VAV	4,806	17 October 2013			UPFA		UPFA	
Anton Jeyanathan	MUL	9,309	11 October 2013	1 October 2016	ITAK	TNA	ITAK	TNA	Deputy Chairman (13-16). Replaced by A. Povaneswaran.
R. Jeyasekaram	BON		2 August 2017		EPRLF	TNA	EPRLF	TNA	Replaces S. Mayuran.
K. Kamalendran	JAF	13,632	17 October 2013	7 April 2014	EPDP	UPFA	EPDP	UPFA	Leader of the Opposition (13-14). Replaced by S. Thavarajah.
V. Kamaleswaran	MUL		18 September 2015			TNA		TNA	Replaces S. Sivamohan. Deputy Chairman (16-).
Vinthan Kanagaratnam	JAF	16,463	11 October 2013		TELO	TNA	TELO	TNA	
Sabaratnam Kugathas	JAF		January 2018			TNA		TNA	Replaces E. Arnold.
T. Kurukularajah	KIL	26,427	11 October 2013		ITAK	TNA	ITAK	TNA	Minister of Education (13-17).
K. T. Linganathan	VAV	11,901	14 October 2013		PLOTE	TNA	PLOTE	TNA	
S. Mayuran	BON		5 July 2016	2017	TELO	TNA	TELO	TNA	Replaces M. P. Nadarajah. Replaced by R. Jeyasekaram.
A. N. S. Mohamed	MAN		January 2018		SLMC		SLMC		Replaces S. M. Rasik.
M. P. Nadarajah	BON		7 April 2015	11 May 2016		TNA		TNA	Replaces Mary Kamala Gunaseelan. Replaced by S. Mayuran.
A. Paranjothy	JAF	16,359	11 October 2013		ITAK	TNA	ITAK	TNA	
S. Pasupathipillai	KIL	26,132	11 October 2013		ITAK	TNA	ITAK	TNA	
A. Povaneswaran	MUL		9 December 2016		TELO	TNA	TELO	TNA	Replaces Anton Jeyanathan.
Angajan Ramanathan	JAF	10,034	17 October 2013	10 September 2015	SLFP	UPFA	SLFP	UPFA	Replaced by S. Agilathas.
S. M. Rasik	MAN	3,165	17 October 2013	December 2017	SLMC		SLMC		Replaced by A. N. S. Mohamed.
T. Raviharan	MUL	8,868	14 October 2013		EPRLF	TNA	EPRLF	TNA	
K. Sarveswaran	JAF	14,761	16 October 2013		EPRLF	TNA	EPRLF	TNA	Minister of Education (17-).
Ananthi Sasitharan	JAF	87,870	11 October 2013		ITAK	TNA	ITAK	TNA	Minister of Women's Affairs (17-).
P. Sathiyalingam	VAV	19,656	11 October 2013		ITAK	TNA	ITAK	TNA	Minister of Health (13-17).
K. Sayanthan	JAF	20,179	11 October 2013		ITAK	TNA	ITAK	TNA	
A. D. D. Senevirathna	VAV	5,148	17 October 2013			UPFA		UPFA	
Alikhan Shariff	MAN	7,583	October 2017		ACMC	UPFA	ACMC	UPFA	Replaces Rifkhan Bathiudeen.
M. K. Shivajilingam	JAF	22,660	14 October 2013		TELO	TNA	TELO	TNA	
D. Siddarthan	JAF	39,715	14 October 2013	25 August 2015	PLOTE	TNA	PLOTE	TNA	Replaced by K. Tharmalingam.
C. V. K. Sivagnanam	JAF	26,747	11 October 2013		ITAK	TNA	ITAK	TNA	Chairman (13-).
S. Sivamohan	MUL	9,296	16 October 2013	25 August 2015	EPRLF	TNA	EPRLF	TNA	Replaced by V. Kamaleswaran.
K. Sivanesan	MUL		30 April 2015		PLOTE	TNA	PLOTE	TNA	Replaces K. Swami Veerabahu. Minister of Agriculture (17-).
V. Sivayogan	JAF	13,479	11 October 2013		ITAK	TNA	ITAK	TNA	
S. R. P. Sraiva	MAN	12,928	11 October 2013			TNA		TNA	
C. Sukirthan	JAF	20,541	11 October 2013		ITAK	TNA	ITAK	TNA	
K. Swami Veerabahu	MUL	8,702	11 October 2013	17 February 2015		TNA		TNA	Replaced by K. Sivanesan.
K. Tharmalingam	JAF		18 September 2015		TULF	TNA	TULF	TNA	Replaces D. Siddarthan.
S. Thavarajah	JAF	9,803	9 April 2014		EPDP	UPFA	EPDP	UPFA	Leader of the Opposition (14-). Replaced by K. Kamalendran.
V. Thavanathan	KIL	3,753	17 October 2013		EPDP	UPFA	EPDP	UPFA	
M. Thiyagarajah	VAV	11,681	16 October 2013		EPRLF	TNA	EPRLF	TNA	
C. V. Vigneswaran	JAF	132,255	7 October 2013		ITAK	TNA	ITAK	TNA	Chief Minister (13-).
