= Vinthan Kanagaratnam =

Sri Lankan politician

Honourable Vinthan Kanagaratnam MPC MMC
- விந்தன் கனகரத்தினம்

Member of the Northern Provincial Council for Jaffna District
- Incumbent
- Assumed office 11 October 2013

Member of Jaffna Municipal Council
- In office 2009–2013

Personal details
- Party: Tamil Eelam Liberation Organization
- Other political affiliations: Tamil National Alliance
- Ethnicity: Sri Lankan Tamil

Karthikesu Nadarasa Kanagaratnam (commonly known as Vinthan Kanagaratnam) is a Sri Lankan Tamil politician and provincial councillor.

Kanagaratnam is treasurer of the Tamil Eelam Liberation Organization. He contested the 2009 local government election as one of the Tamil National Alliance's candidates and was elected to the Jaffna Municipal Council. He contested the 2013 provincial council election as one of the TNA's candidates in Jaffna District and was elected to the Northern Provincial Council. After the election he was appointed to assist the Minister of Fisheries, Transport, Trade and Rural Development on trade and commerce. He took his oath as provincial councillor in front of Chief Minister C. V. Vigneswaran at Veerasingam Hall on 11 October 2013.
