= A. Paranjothy =

Sri Lankan politician

Honourable A. Paranjothy MPC MMC
- அ. பரஞ்சோதி ආරියකුට්ටි පරංචෝති
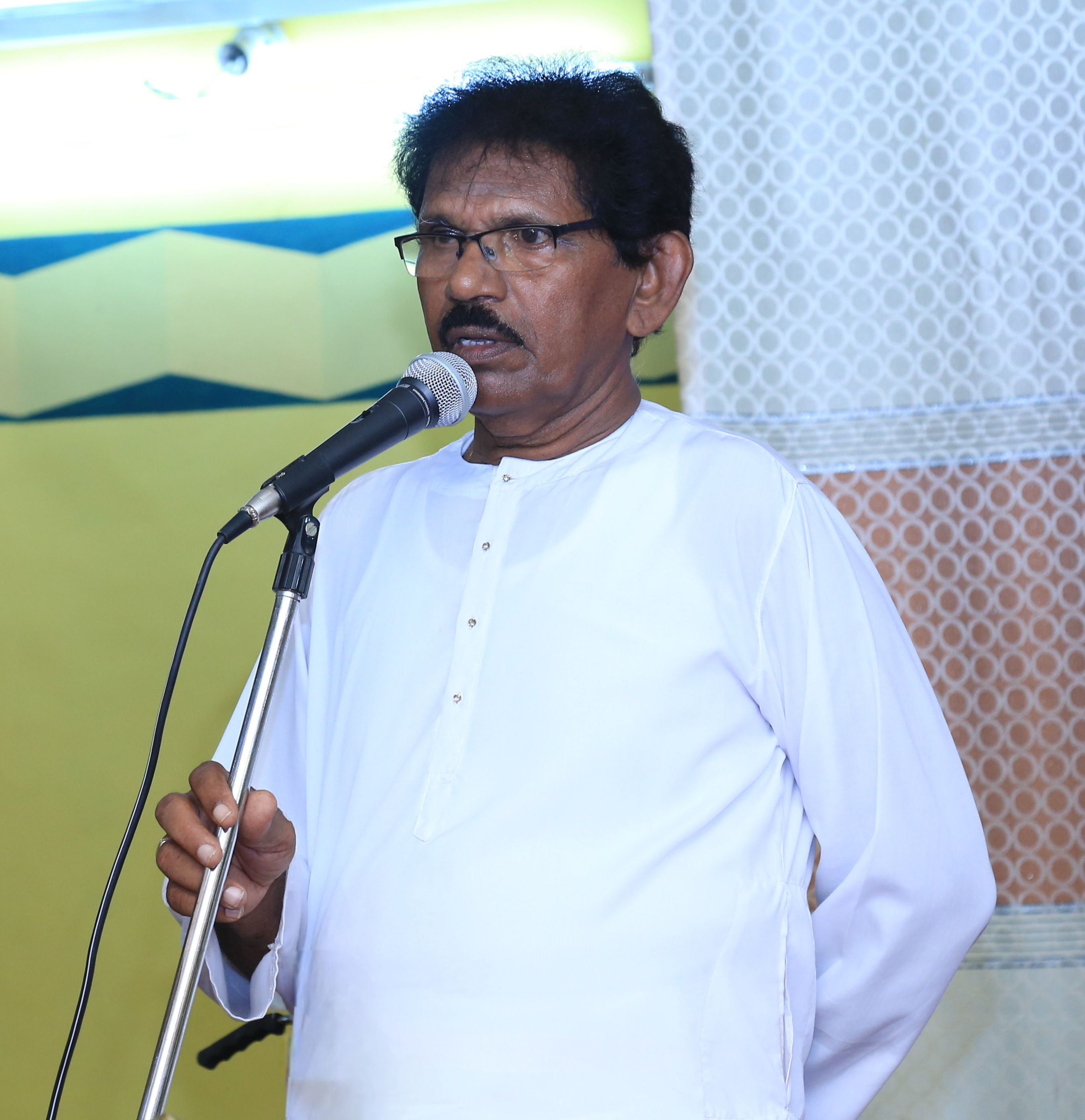

Member of the Northern Provincial Council for Jaffna District
- Incumbent
- Assumed office 11 October 2013

Member of Jaffna Municipal Council
- In office 2009–2013

Personal details
- Party: Illankai Tamil Arasu Kachchi
- Other political affiliations: Tamil National Alliance
- Ethnicity: Sri Lankan Tamil

Ariyakutty Paranjothy (Tamil: அரியகுட்டி பரஞ்சோதி) is a Sri Lankan Tamil politician and provincial councillor.

Paranjothy contested the 2009 local government election as one of the Tamil National Alliance's candidates and was elected to the Jaffna Municipal Council. He contested the 2013 provincial council election as one of the TNA's candidates in Jaffna District and was elected to the Northern Provincial Council. After the election he was appointed to assist the Minister of Fisheries, Transport, Trade and Rural Development on rural development. He took his oath as provincial councillor in front of Chief Minister C. V. Vigneswaran at Veerasingam Hall on 11 October 2013.
