= C. Sukirthan =

Sri Lankan politician

Honourable C. Sukirthan MPC

Member of the Northern Provincial Council for Jaffna District
- Incumbent
- Assumed office 11 October 2013

Personal details
- Party: Illankai Tamil Arasu Kachchi
- Other political affiliations: Tamil National Alliance
- Ethnicity: Sri Lankan Tamil

Chandralingam Sukirthan (Tamil: சந்திரலிங்கம் சுகிர்தன்) is a Sri Lankan Tamil politician and provincial councillor.

Sukirthan contested the 2013 provincial council election as one of the Tamil National Alliance's candidates in Jaffna District and was elected to the Northern Provincial Council. After the election he was appointed to assist the Minister of Fisheries, Transport, Trade and Rural Development on co-operative banks. He took his oath as provincial councillor in front of Chief Minister C. V. Vigneswaran at Veerasingam Hall on 11 October 2013.
