= K. Sayanthan =

Sri Lankan politician

Honourable K. Sayanthan MPC

Member of the Northern Provincial Council for Jaffna District
- Incumbent
- Assumed office 11 October 2013

Personal details
- Party: Illankai Tamil Arasu Kachchi
- Other party: Tamil National Alliance
- Profession: Lawyer
- Ethnicity: Sri Lankan Tamil

Kesavan Sayanthan (Tamil: கேசவன் சயந்தன்) is a Sri Lankan Tamil lawyer, politician and provincial councillor.

Sayanthan contested the 2013 provincial council election as one of the Tamil National Alliance's candidates in Jaffna District and was elected to the Northern Provincial Council. After the election he was appointed to assist the Chief Minister on human rights and co-operatives. He took his oath as provincial councillor in front of Chief Minister C. V. Vigneswaran at Veerasingam Hall on 11 October 2013.
