= K. Swami Veerabahu =

Sri Lankan politician

Honourable K. Swami Veerabahu MPC

Member of the Northern Provincial Council for Mullaitivu District
- In office 11 October 2013 – 17 February 2015

Personal details
- Born: 30 June 1948
- Died: 17 February 2015 (aged 66) Jaffna, Sri Lanka
- Party: Tamil National Alliance
- Ethnicity: Sri Lankan Tamil

Kanagasundaram Swami Veerabahu (30 June 1948 – 17 February 2015) was a Sri Lankan Tamil politician and provincial councillor.

Swami Veerabahu contested the 2013 provincial council election as one of the Tamil National Alliance's candidates in Mullaitivu District and was elected to the Northern Provincial Council. After the election he was appointed to assist the Minister of Agriculture, Livestock, Irrigation and Environment on protection of the environment. He took his oath as provincial councillor in front of Chief Minister C. V. Vigneswaran at Veerasingam Hall on 11 October 2013.

Swami Veerabahu was diagnosed with cancer and was being treated at a private hospital in Vavuniya. His condition worsened on 17 February 2015 and he was transferred to Jaffna Teaching Hospital but died that evening.
