= B. Gajatheepan =

Sri Lankan Tamil teacher and politician (born 1982)

Honourable B. Gajatheepan MPC
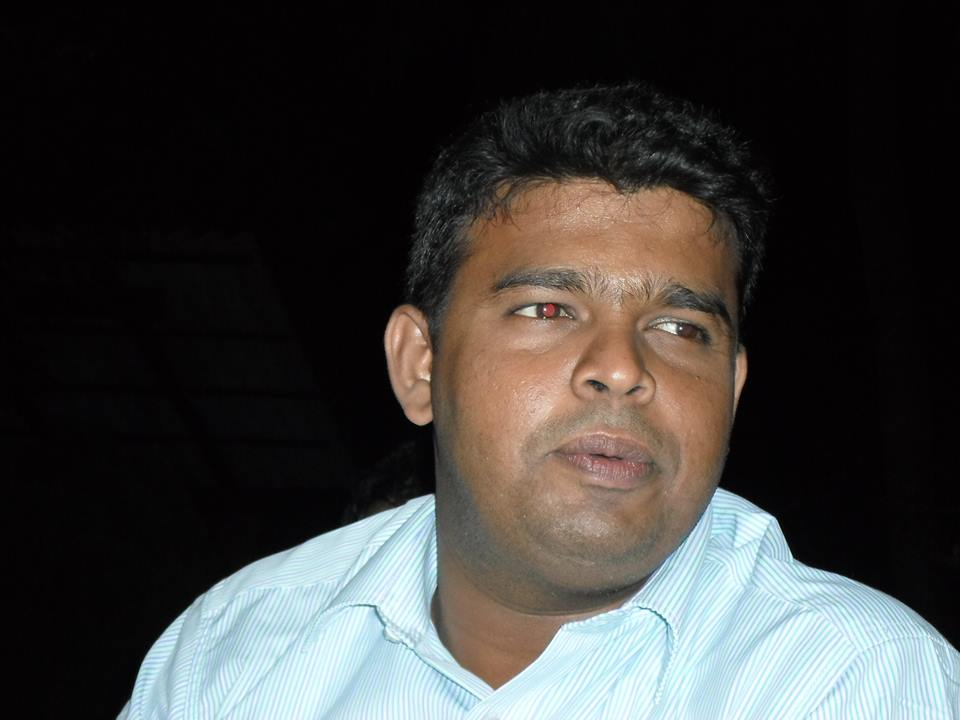

Member of the Northern Provincial Council for Jaffna District
- Incumbent
- Assumed office 11 October 2013

Personal details
- Born: 30 April 1982 (age 44)
- Party: Illankai Tamil Arasu Kachchi
- Other political affiliations: Tamil National Alliance
- Education: Jaffna Hindu College; Kopay Teacher Training College
- Profession: Teacher
- Ethnicity: Sri Lankan Tamil

Balachandran Gajatheepan is a Sri Lankan Tamil teacher, politician and provincial councillor.

Gajatheepan was educated at Jaffna Hindu College and Kopay Teacher Training College. He was a teacher at Analativu Sathasivam Maha Vidyalayam and Union College, Tellippalai. He is leader of the Illankai Tamil Arasu Kachchi's youth wing.

Gajatheepan contested the 2013 provincial council election as one of the Tamil National Alliance's candidates in Jaffna District and was elected to the Northern Provincial Council. After the election he was appointed to assist the Chief Minister on tourism. He took his oath as provincial councillor in front of Chief Minister C. V. Vigneswaran at Veerasingam Hall on 11 October 2013.
