= Ayub Asmin =

Sri Lankan politician

Honourable Ayub Asmin MPC

Member of the Northern Provincial Council for Bonus Seat
- Incumbent
- Assumed office 11 October 2013

Personal details
- Party: Tamil National Alliance

Al Shaikh Ayub Asmin is a Sri Lankan Tamil politician and provincial councillor.

Asmin is a member of the People's Movement for Good Governance.

Asmin contested the 2013 provincial council election as one of the Tamil National Alliance's candidates in Mannar District but failed to get elected. He was nevertheless appointed to the Northern Provincial Council through the two bonus seats of TNA. After the election he was appointed to assist the Chief Minister on the resettlement and rehabilitation of the province's Muslim population. He took his oath as provincial councillor in front of Chief Minister C. V. Vigneswaran at Veerasingam Hall on 11 October 2013.
