= S. Pasupathipillai =

Sri Lankan politician

Honourable S. Pasupathipillai MPC

Member of the Northern Provincial Council for Kilinochchi District
- Incumbent
- Assumed office 11 October 2013

Personal details
- Party: Illankai Tamil Arasu Kachchi
- Other political affiliations: Tamil National Alliance
- Ethnicity: Sri Lankan Tamil

Subramaniam Pasupathipillai (Tamil: சுப்பிரமணியம் பசுபதிப்பிள்ளை) is a Sri Lankan Tamil politician and provincial councillor.

Pasupathipillai is secretary of the Kilinochchi District branch of the Illankai Tamil Arasu Kachchi. He contested the 2013 provincial council election as one of the Tamil National Alliance's candidates in Kilinochchi District and was elected to the Northern Provincial Council. After the election he was appointed to assist the Chief Minister on electricity and electrification. He took his oath as provincial councillor in front of Chief Minister C. V. Vigneswaran at Veerasingam Hall on 11 October 2013.
