= S. R. P. Sraiva =

Sri Lankan politician

Honourable S. R. P. Sraiva MPC

Member of the Northern Provincial Council for Mannar District
- Incumbent
- Assumed office 11 October 2013

Personal details
- Party: Tamil National Alliance
- Profession: Lawyer
- Ethnicity: Sri Lankan Tamil

Anthony Soosai Ratnam Pirimus Sraiva is a Sri Lankan Tamil lawyer, politician and provincial councillor.

Sraiva contested the 2013 provincial council election as one of the Tamil National Alliance's candidates in Mannar District and was elected to the Northern Provincial Council. After the election he was appointed to assist the Chief Minister on policing and public order. He took his oath as provincial councillor in front of Chief Minister C. V. Vigneswaran at Veerasingam Hall on 11 October 2013.
