= Mary Kamala Gunaseelan =

Sri Lankan politician

Honourable Mary Kamala Gunaseelan MPC

Member of the Northern Provincial Council for Bonus Seat
- Incumbent
- Assumed office 11 October 2013

Personal details
- Party: Tamil United Liberation Front
- Other political affiliations: Tamil National Alliance
- Profession: Teacher
- Ethnicity: Sri Lankan Tamil

Mary Kamala Gunaseelan is a Sri Lankan Tamil teacher, politician and provincial councillor.

Gunaseelan was vice-principal of Arasaratnam Vidyalayam.

Gunaseelan contested the 2013 provincial council election as one of the Tamil National Alliance's candidates in Mullaitivu District but failed to get elected. She was nevertheless appointed to the Northern Provincial Council as one of the TNA's two bonus seats. After the election she was appointed to assist the Minister of Education, Cultural Affairs and Sports on libraries, museums and cultural matters. She took her oath as provincial councillor in front of Chief Minister C. V. Vigneswaran at Veerasingam Hall on 11 October 2013.
