= R. Indrarajah =

Sri Lankan politician

Honourable R. Indrarajah MPC

Member of the Northern Provincial Council for Vavuniya District
- Incumbent
- Assumed office 18 October 2013

Personal details
- Party: Eelam People's Revolutionary Liberation Front
- Other political affiliations: Tamil National Alliance
- Ethnicity: Sri Lankan Tamil

Ramanathan Indrarajah is a Sri Lankan Tamil politician and provincial councillor.

Indrarajah contested the 2013 provincial council election as one of the Tamil National Alliance's candidates in Vavuniya District and was elected to the Northern Provincial Council. After the election he was appointed to assist the Minister of Education, Cultural Affairs and Sports on infrastructure development. He took his oath as provincial councillor in front of Chief Minister C. V. Vigneswaran at the Valikamam South West Divisional Council office on 18 October 2013.
