= C. V. K. Sivagnanam =

Sri Lankan politician

Honourable C. V. K. Sivagnanam MPC
- சி. வீ. கே. சிவஞானம் සී.වී.කේ. සිවඥානම්
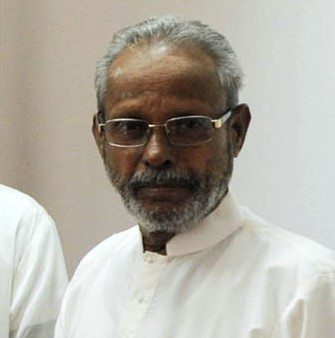
- Sivagnanam in March 2015

Chairman of the Northern Provincial Council
- Incumbent
- Assumed office 25 October 2013

Member of the Northern Provincial Council for Jaffna District
- Incumbent
- Assumed office 11 October 2013

Personal details
- Party: Illankai Tamil Arasu Kachchi
- Other political affiliations: Tamil National Alliance
- Profession: Civil servant
- Ethnicity: Sri Lankan Tamil

C. Velupillai Kandaiah Sivagnanam (Tamil: சி. வேலுப்பிள்ளை கந்தையா சிவஞானம் ; Sinhala: සී.වී.කේ. සිවඥානම්) is a Sri Lankan Tamil civil servant, politician and provincial councillor.

Sivagnanam was commissioner of Jaffna Municipal Council. After retirement, he contested the 2004 and 2010 parliamentary elections as one of the Tamil National Alliance's candidates in Jaffna District but on each occasion failed to get elected.

Sivagnanam contested the 2013 provincial council election as one of the Tamil National Alliance's candidates in Jaffna District and was elected to the Northern Provincial Council. He took his oath as provincial councillor in front of Chief Minister C. V. Vigneswaran at Veerasingam Hall on 11 October 2013. He was elected unopposed as Chairman of the Northern Provincial Council at its inaugural meeting on 25 October 2013.
