= Anton Jeyanathan =

Sri Lankan politician

Honourable Anton Jeyanathan MPC
- அன்ரன் ஜெயநாதன்

Deputy Chairman of the Northern Provincial Council
- In office 25 October 2013 – 1 October 2016

Member of the Northern Provincial Council for Mullaitivu District
- In office 11 October 2013 – 1 October 2016

Personal details
- Born: 11 May 1948
- Died: 1 October 2016 (aged 68) Mullaitivu District, Sri Lanka
- Party: Illankai Tamil Arasu Kachchi
- Other political affiliations: Tamil National Alliance
- Profession: Teacher
- Ethnicity: Sri Lankan Tamil

Mariyampillai Antony Jeyanathan (Tamil: மரியம்பிள்ளை அன்ரனி ஜெகநாதன்; 11 May 1948 – 1 October 2016) was a Sri Lankan Tamil teacher, politician and provincial councillor.

Jeyanathan was born on 11 May 1948. He was the son of Mariyampillai and Mary Theresa. He was educated at Mullaitivu Maha Vidyalayam.

Jeyanathan was a teacher and served as a school principal before becoming a director of education.

Jeyanathan contested the 2013 provincial council election as one of the Tamil National Alliance's candidates in Mullaitivu District and was elected to the Northern Provincial Council. After the election he was appointed to assist the Chief Minister on social services and rehabilitation. He took his oath as provincial councillor in front of Chief Minister C. V. Vigneswaran at Veerasingam Hall on 11 October 2013. He was elected unopposed as Deputy Chairman of the Northern Provincial Council at its inaugural meeting on 25 October 2013.

On the morning of 1 October 2016 Jeyanathan was riding a motorbike near Mulliyawalai when he fell off the bike following a suspected heart attack. He was taken to Mullaitivu Hospital (Mancholai Base Hospital) but was pronounced dead on arrival.
