= Kandiah Sivanesan =

Sri Lankan politician

Honourable Kandiah Sivanesan MPC
- க. சிவநேசன்

Minister of Agriculture and Agrarian Services, Animal Husbandry, Irrigation, Fisheries, Water Supply and Environment, Northern Province
- Incumbent
- Assumed office 23 August 2017
- Preceded by: C. V. Vigneswaran

Member of the Northern Provincial Council for Mullaitivu District
- Incumbent
- Assumed office 30 April 2015
- Preceded by: K. Swami Veerabahu

Personal details
- Party: People's Liberation Organisation of Tamil Eelam
- Other political affiliations: Tamil National Alliance
- Ethnicity: Sri Lankan Tamil

Kandiah Sivanesan (Tamil: கந்தையா சிவநேசன், romanized: Kantaiyā Civanēcaṉ) is a Sri Lankan Tamil politician and provincial minister.

== Career ==
Sivanesan, also known by the Bavan, is a member of the People's Liberation Organisation of Tamil Eelam

Sivanesan was one of the Democratic People's Liberation Front's (DPLF) (the political wing of PLOTE) candidates in Vanni District at the 2004 parliamentary election but the DPLF failed to win any seats in Parliament. He contested the 2010 parliamentary election as one of the DPLF's candidates in Vanni but again the DPLF failed to win any seats in Parliament. He was one of the Tamil National Alliance's (TNA) candidates in Vanni District at the 2015 parliamentary election but failed to get elected after coming seventh amongst the TNA candidates.

Sivanesan contested the 2013 provincial council election as one of the TNA's candidates in Mullaitivu District but failed to get elected. However, following the death of K. Swami Veerabahu in February 2015 he was appointed to the Northern Provincial Council in April 2015.

Sivanesan was sworn in as Minister of Agriculture and Agrarian Services, Animal Husbandry, Irrigation, Fisheries, Water Supply and Environment in front of Governor Reginald Cooray on 23 August 2017.

== Electoral history ==
Electoral history of K. Sivanesan
Election	Constituency	Party	Votes	Result
2004 parliamentary	Vanni District	DPLF	1,394	Not elected
2010 parliamentary	Vanni District	DPLF		Not elected
2013 provincial	Mullaitivu District	TNA		Not elected
2015 parliamentary	Vanni District	TNA	13,069	Not elected
