= T. Raviharan =

Sri Lankan politician

Honourable T. Raviharan MPC

Member of the Northern Provincial Council for Mullaitivu District
- Incumbent
- Assumed office 14 October 2013

Personal details
- Party: Eelam People's Revolutionary Liberation Front
- Other political affiliations: Tamil National Alliance
- Ethnicity: Sri Lankan Tamil

Arumugam Sinnaththurai Thurairajah Raviharan is a Sri Lankan Tamil politician and provincial councillor.

Raviharan contested the 2013 provincial council election as one of the Tamil National Alliance's candidates in Mullaitivu District and was elected to the Northern Provincial Council. After the election he was appointed to assist the Minister of Fisheries, Transport, Trade and Rural Development on fisheries. He took his oath as provincial councillor in front of Chief Minister C. V. Vigneswaran at his residence in Colombo on 14 October 2013.
