= M. Thiyagarajah =

Sri Lankan politician

Honourable M. Thiyagarajah MPC

Member of the Northern Provincial Council for Vavuniya District
- Incumbent
- Assumed office 16 October 2013

Personal details
- Party: Eelam People's Revolutionary Liberation Front
- Other political affiliations: Tamil National Alliance
- Ethnicity: Sri Lankan Tamil

M. Thiyagarajah is a Sri Lankan Tamil politician and provincial councillor.

Thiyagarajah contested the 2013 provincial council election as one of the Tamil National Alliance's candidates in Vavuniya District and was elected to the Northern Provincial Council. After the election he was appointed to assist the Minister of Agriculture, Livestock, Irrigation and Environment on animal husbandry. He took his oath as provincial councillor in front of attorney-at-law K. Thayaparan at Vavuniya on 16 October 2013.
