= K. T. Linganathan =

Sri Lankan politician

Honourable K. T. Linganathan MPC
- க. தா. லிங்கநாதன்

Member of the Northern Provincial Council for Vavuniya District
- Incumbent
- Assumed office 14 October 2013

Member of Vavuniya Urban Council
- In office 2009–2011
- Succeeded by: Suwampillai Thevakingsly Rajeswaran

Personal details
- Party: People's Liberation Organisation of Tamil Eelam
- Other political affiliations: Tamil National Alliance
- Ethnicity: Sri Lankan Tamil

Kanthar Thamotharampillai Linganathan (Tamil: கந்தர் தாமோதரம்பிள்ளை லிங்கநாதன்) is a Sri Lankan Tamil politician and provincial councillor.

Linganathan was chairman of Vavuniya Urban Council in the late 1990s. He was re-elected to the council at the 2009 local government election but his party, the Democratic People's Liberation Front, the political wing of the People's Liberation Organisation of Tamil Eelam, lost control of the council to the Tamil National Alliance (TNA). Linganathan became leader of the opposition. He resigned from the council in 2011.

Linganathan contested the 2013 provincial council election as one of the TNA's candidates in Vavuniya District and was elected to the Northern Provincial Council. After the election he was appointed to assist the Minister of Agriculture, Livestock, Irrigation and Environment on agricultural services. He took his oath as provincial councillor in front of PLOTE Secretary and All Island Justice Peace Subramanian Sathananthan at Chunnakam on 14 October 2013.
