= K. Sarveswaran =

Sri Lankan politician

Honourable K. Sarveswaran MPC
- க. சர்வேஸ்வரன்

Minister of Education, Sports and Youth Affairs and Cultural Affairs, Northern Province
- Incumbent
- Assumed office 29 June 2017
- Preceded by: C. V. Vigneswaran

Member of the Northern Provincial Council for Jaffna District
- Incumbent
- Assumed office 16 October 2013

Personal details
- Party: Eelam People's Revolutionary Liberation Front
- Other political affiliations: Tamil National Alliance
- Ethnicity: Sri Lankan Tamil

Arumugam Kandiah Sarveswaran (Tamil: ஆறுமுகம் கந்தையா சர்வேஸ்வரன், romanized: Āṟumukam Kantaiyā Carvēsvaraṉ) is a Sri Lankan Tamil politician and provincial minister.

Sarveswaran is the brother of Eelam People's Revolutionary Liberation Front leader Suresh Premachandran.

Sarveswaran contested the 2013 provincial council election as one of the Tamil National Alliance's candidates in Jaffna District and was elected to the Northern Provincial Council. After the election he was appointed to assist the Chief Minister on economic planning. He took his oath as provincial councillor in front of attorney-at-law K. Thayaparan at Vavuniya on 16 October 2013.

Sarveswaran was sworn in as Minister of Education, Sports and Youth Affairs and Cultural Affairs in front of Governor Reginald Cooray on 29 June 2017.
