= S. Sivamohan =

Sri Lankan politician

Hon. S. Sivamohan MP MPC
- சி. சிவமோகன்

Member of Parliament for Vanni District
- Incumbent
- Assumed office 2015

Member of the Northern Provincial Council for Mullaitivu District
- In office 2013–2015
- Succeeded by: Vallipuram Kamaleswaran

Personal details
- Party: Eelam People's Revolutionary Liberation Front
- Other political affiliations: Tamil National Alliance
- Profession: Physician

Sivapragasam Sivamohan (Tamil: சிவப்பிரகாசம் சிவமோகன்) is a Sri Lankan Tamil physician, politician and Member of Parliament.

== Career ==
Sivamohan contested the 2013 provincial council election as one of the Tamil National Alliance's (TNA) candidates in Mullaitivu District and was elected to the Northern Provincial Council. After the election he was appointed to assist the Minister of Health and Indigenous Medicine on disease prevention. He took his oath as provincial councillor in front of attorney-at-law K. Thayaparan at Vavuniya on 16 October 2013.

Sivamohan was one of the TNA's candidates in Vanni District at the 2015 parliamentary election. He was elected and entered Parliament.

== Electoral history ==
Electoral history of S. Sivamohan
Election	Constituency	Party	Votes	Result
2013 provincial	Mullaitivu District	TNA	9,296	Elected
2015 parliamentary	Vanni District	TNA	18,412	Elected
