= Arumugam =

- Pronunciation: Āṟumukam
- Gender: Male
- Language: Tamil

Origin
- Meaning: The six faced
- Region of origin: Southern India; North-eastern Sri Lanka

Other names
- Alternative spelling: Arumuga; Arumuka; Arumukan
- Derived: Murugan

Arumugam or Arumukan is a Tamil male given name. Due to the Tamil tradition of using patronymic surnames it may also be a surname for males and females. Arumugam is one of the many names of the Hindu god Murugan, which refers to his six faces (Aru = six + Mugam = face).

== Notable people ==
=== Given name ===
- Arumugam, Indian politician
- A. Arumugam, Indian politician
- A. S. A. Arumugam, Indian politician
- C. Arumugam, Indian politician
- J. N. Arumugam (1896–?), Ceylonese civil servant
- K. Arumugam (Hockey Journalist)
- R. Arumugam (1953–1988), Malaysian footballer
- R. S. Arumugam, Indian politician
- T. Arumugam, Indian politician
- T. P. Arumugam, Indian politician
- V. Arumugam, Indian politician
- V. Arumugam, Malaysian politician
- Veerapandi S. Arumugam (1937–2012), Indian politician
- Arumuka Navalar (1822–1879), Ceylonese revivalist

=== Surname ===
- Arumugam Arulpiragasam (died 1975), Ceylonese civil servant
- Arumugam Canagaratnam (1873–1929), Ceylonese lawyer and politician
- Arumugam Kandaiah Premachandran (born 1957), Sri Lankan politician
- Arumugam Kandiah Sarveswaran, Sri Lankan politician
- Arumugam Mohanasundaram (1928–2012), Indian actor
- Arumugam Pillai Coomaraswamy (1783–1836), Ceylonese politician
- Arumugam Sinnaththurai Thurairajah Raviharan, Sri Lankan politician
- Arumugam Thiagarajah (1916–1981), Sri Lankan teacher and politician
- Arumugam Thondaman (born 1964), Sri Lankan politician
- Arumugam Vijiaratnam (1921–2016), Singaporean athlete
- Arumugam Wisvalingam Mailvaganam (1906–1987), Sri Lankan physicist and academic
- David Arumugam, Malaysian singer
- Loganathan Arumugam (1953–2007), Malaysian singer
- Nicole Arumugam, British actress
