= March 2014 Sri Lankan provincial council elections =

6th Sri Lankan provincial council election
- 29 March 2014

159 seats across 2 provincial councils
- Turnout: 66.35%
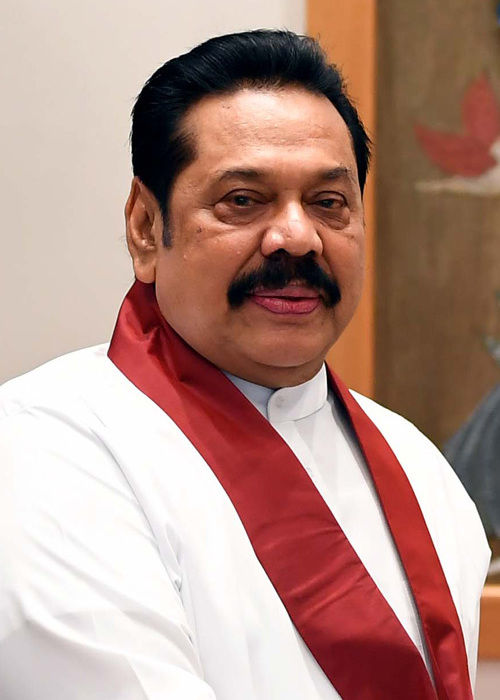

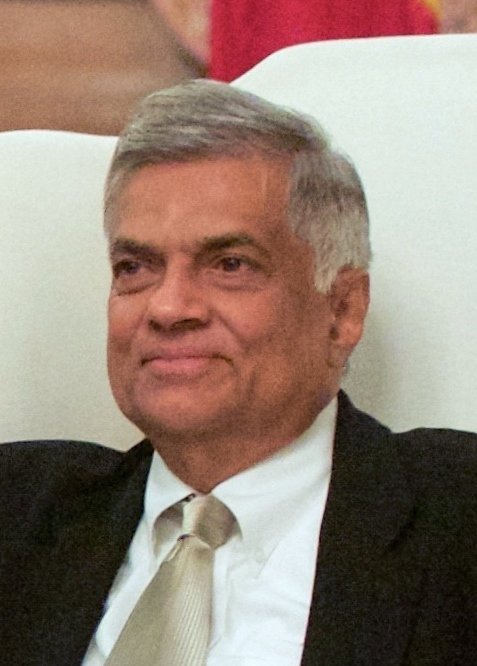

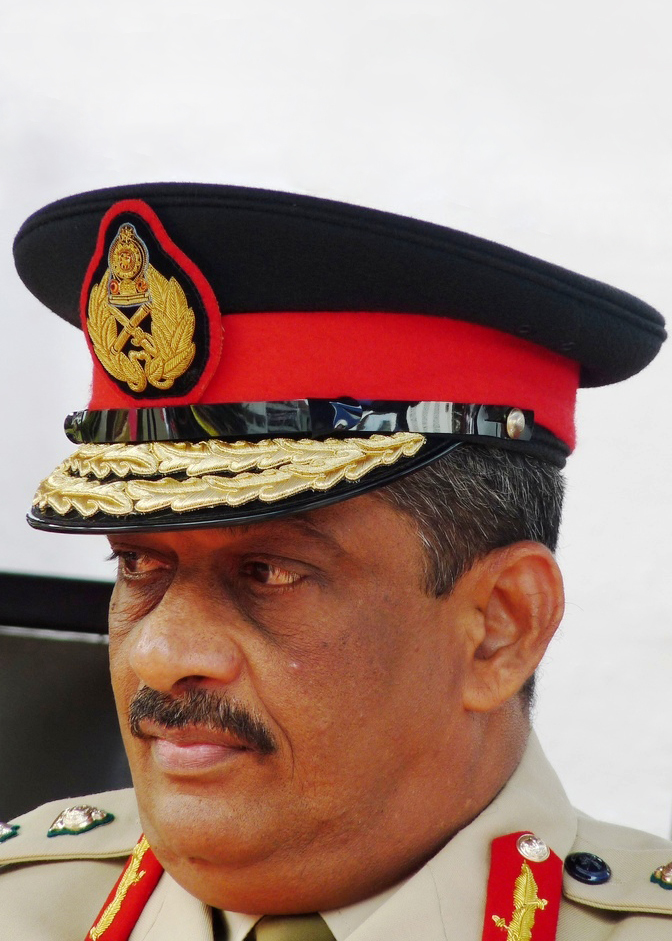
	First party	Second party
Leader	Mahinda Rajapaksa	Ranil Wickremasinghe
Party	UPFA	UNP
Popular vote	2,063,083	990,113
Percentage	54.86%	26.33%
Councillors	89	42
Councils	2	0
	Third party	Fourth party
Leader	Sarath Fonseka	Anura Kumara Dissanayake
Party	Democratic	JVP
Popular vote	279,299	265,240
Percentage	7.43%	7.05%
Councillors	12	11
Councils	0	0

Provincial council elections were held in Sri Lanka on 29 March 2014 to elect 159 members to two of the nine provincial councils in the country. 5.9 million Sri Lankans were eligible to vote in the election. Elections to a third provincial council (Uva) were held on 20 September. Elections to the remaining six provincial councils were not due as they had their last election in 2012 or 2013.

The United People's Freedom Alliance's domination of Sri Lankan elections continued as expected. It retained control of both Southern Provincial Council and Western Provincial Council. However, the UPFA recorded a loss of votes in both provinces as did the main opposition party, the United National Party, in the Western Province. Instead, many analysts assert a large protest vote was evident during this provincial election with many either opting not to vote or to vote for minor parties such as the Janatha Vimukthi Peramuna, Democratic Party and Democratic People's Front.

== Background ==
In an attempt to end the Sri Lankan Civil War the Indo-Lanka Accord was signed on 29 July 1987. One of the requirements of the accord was that the Sri Lankan government to devolve powers to the provinces. Accordingly, on 14 November 1987 the Sri Lankan Parliament passed the 13th Amendment to the 1978 Constitution of Sri Lanka and the Provincial Councils Act No 42 of 1987. On 3 February 1988 nine provincial councils were created by order. The first elections for provincial councils took place on 28 April 1988 in North Central, North Western, Sabaragamuwa, and Uva provinces. On 2 June 1988 elections were held for provincial councils for Central, Southern and Western provinces. The United National Party (UNP), which was in power nationally, won control of all seven provincial councils.

The Indo-Lanka Accord also required the merger of the Eastern and Northern provinces into one administrative unit. The accord required a referendum to be held by 31 December 1988 in the Eastern Province to decide whether the merger should be permanent. Crucially, the accord allowed the Sri Lankan president to postpone the referendum at his discretion. On September 2 and 8 1988 President Jayewardene issued proclamations enabling the Eastern and Northern provinces to be one administrative unit administered by one elected council, creating the North Eastern Province. Elections in the newly merged North Eastern Province were held on 19 November 1988. The Eelam People's Revolutionary Liberation Front, an Indian backed paramilitary group, won control of the North Eastern provincial council.

On 1 March 1990, just as the Indian Peace Keeping Force were preparing to withdraw from Sri Lanka, Annamalai Varadaraja Perumal, Chief Minister of the North Eastern Province, moved a motion in the North Eastern Provincial Council declaring an independent Eelam. President Premadasa reacted to Permual's UDI by dissolving the provincial council and imposing direct rule on the province.

The 2nd Sri Lankan provincial council election was held in 1993 in seven provinces. The UNP retained control of six provincial councils but lost control of the largest provincial council, Western, to the opposition People's Alliance. A special election was held in Southern Province in 1994 after some UNP provincial councillors defected to the opposition. The PA won the election and took control of the Southern Provincial Council.

The 3rd Sri Lankan provincial council election was held in 1999 in seven provinces. The PA, which was now in power nationally, managed to win the majority of seats in two provinces (North Central and North Western). It was also able to form a majority administration in the other five provinces with the support of smaller parties such as the Ceylon Workers' Congress (CWC) . The UNP regained control of the Central Provincial Council in 2002 after the CWC councillors crossed over to the opposition.

The 4th Sri Lankan provincial council election was held in 2004 in seven provinces. The United People's Freedom Alliance (UPFA), the successor to the PA, won all seven provinces.

On 14 July 2006, after a long campaign against the merger, the JVP filed three separate petitions with the Supreme Court of Sri Lanka requesting a separate Provincial Council for the East. On 16 October 2006 the Supreme Court ruled that the proclamations issued by President Jayewardene were null and void and had no legal effect. The North Eastern Province was formally demerged into the Northern and Eastern provinces on 1 January 2007.

The 5th Sri Lankan provincial council election was held on a staggered basis during 2008/09 in eight provinces including the newly demerged Eastern Province. The UPFA won all eight provinces.

The 6th Sri Lankan provincial council election was also held on a staggered basis during 2012-14 in eight provinces, including in the Northern Province for the first time in 25 years. Elections were held on 8 September 2012 in Eastern, North Central and Sabaragamuwa provinces. The UPFA won the majority of seats in two provinces (North Central and Sabaragamuwa) and was also able to form a majority administration in Eastern Provinces with the support of the Sri Lanka Muslim Congress. Elections were held on 21 September 2013 in Central, Northern and North Western provinces. The UPFA won the majority of seats in two provinces (Central and North Western) whilst the Tamil National Alliance won in the Northern Province. Southern Provincial Council and Western Provincial Council were dissolved by their governors on 12 January 2014.

== Results ==
=== Overall ===
The UPFA won control of both provincial councils (Southern and Western).

Alliances and parties	Votes	%	Seats	Councils
United People's Freedom Alliance: All Ceylon Makkal Congress; Ceylon Workers' Congress; Communist Party of Sri Lanka; Democratic Left Front; Jathika Hela Urumaya; Lanka Sama Samaja Party; Mahajana Eksath Peramuna; National Freedom Front; Sri Lanka Freedom Party; Sri Lanka Muslim Congress	2,063,083	54.86%	89	2
United National Party	990,113	26.33%	42	0
Democratic Party	279,299	7.43%	12	0
Janatha Vimukthi Peramuna	265,240	7.05%	11	0
Democratic People's Front	51,000	1.36%	2	0
Sri Lanka Muslim Congress	50,934	1.35%	2	0
All Ceylon Makkal Congress	15,491	0.41%	1	0
Independents	18,283	0.49%	0	0
Ceylon Workers' Congress	8,216	0.22%	0	0
United Lanka People's Party	3,696	0.10%	0	0
Jana Setha Peramuna	3,176	0.08%	0	0
Patriotic National Front	2,084	0.06%	0	0
United Lanka Great Council	2,065	0.05%	0	0
New Democratic Front	1,696	0.05%	0	0
Nava Sama Samaja Party	1,387	0.04%	0	0
United Socialist Party	1,343	0.04%	0	0
Sri Lanka People's Party	854	0.02%	0	0
Our National Front	649	0.02%	0	0
Sri Lanka Labour Party	569	0.02%	0	0
All Are Citizens, All Are Kings Organisation	375	0.01%	0	0
United Peace Front	292	0.01%	0	0
New Sinhala Heritage	245	0.01%	0	0
Socialist Equality Party	220	0.01%	0	0
Liberal Party	155	0.00%	0	0
Motherland	136	0.00%	0	0
Valid Votes	3,760,601	100.00%	159	2
Rejected Votes	161,011			
Total Polled	3,921,612			
Registered Electors	5,910,877			
Turnout	66.35%			

=== Southern Province ===
Results of the 7th Southern Provincial Council election held on 29 March 2014:

Alliances and parties	Galle			Hambantota			Matara			Bonus Seats	Total		
Alliances and parties	Votes	%	Seats	Votes	%	Seats	Votes	%	Seats	Bonus Seats	Votes	%	Seats
United People's Freedom Alliance	293,619	57.58%	13	174,687	57.42%	8	231,102	59.19%	10	2	699,408	58.06%	33
United National Party	134,305	26.34%	6	79,829	26.24%	4	96,297	24.66%	4	0	310,431	25.77%	14
Janatha Vimukthi Peramuna	30,529	5.99%	1	39,345	12.93%	2	39,158	10.03%	2	0	109,032	9.05%	5
Democratic Party	45,484	8.92%	2	9,547	3.14%	0	20,501	5.25%	1	0	75,532	6.27%	3
Independents	1,277	0.25%	0	277	0.09%	0	616	0.16%	0	0	2,170	0.18%	0
United Lanka People's Party	1,241	0.24%	0	175	0.06%	0	207	0.05%	0	0	1,623	0.13%	0
Sri Lanka Muslim Congress							1,419	0.36%	0	0	1,419	0.12%	0
United Lanka Great Council	611	0.12%	0	156	0.05%	0	168	0.04%	0	0	935	0.08%	0
Sri Lanka People's Party	854	0.17%	0							0	854	0.07%	0
New Democratic Front	425	0.08%	0				225	0.06%	0	0	650	0.05%	0
United Socialist Party	604	0.12%	0							0	604	0.05%	0
Patriotic National Front	366	0.07%	0	95	0.03%	0	139	0.04%	0	0	600	0.05%	0
Jana Setha Peramuna	172	0.03%	0	100	0.03%	0	95	0.02%	0	0	367	0.03%	0
Our National Front							319	0.08%	0	0	319	0.03%	0
Sri Lanka Labour Party	183	0.04%	0	41	0.01%	0	14	0.00%	0	0	238	0.02%	0
Liberal Party	84	0.02%	0				71	0.02%	0	0	155	0.01%	0
Motherland	136	0.03%	0							0	136	0.01%	0
Nava Sama Samaja Party							97	0.02%	0	0	97	0.01%	0
Valid Votes	509,890	100.00%	22	304,252	100.00%	14	390,428	100.00%	17	2	1,204,570	100.00%	55
Rejected Votes	21,135			10,879			15,712				47,726		
Total Polled	531,025			315,131			406,140				1,252,296		
Registered Electors	809,882			467,847			608,524				1,886,253		
Turnout	65.57%			67.36%			66.74%				66.39%		

=== Western Province ===
Results of the 6th Western Provincial Council election held on 29 March 2014:

Alliances and parties	Colombo			Gampaha			Kalutara			Bonus Seats	Total		
Alliances and parties	Votes	%	Seats	Votes	%	Seats	Votes	%	Seats	Bonus Seats	Votes	%	Seats
United People's Freedom Alliance	443,083	45.33%	18	582,668	57.98%	23	337,924	58.91%	13	2	1,363,675	53.35%	56
United National Party	285,538	29.21%	12	249,220	24.80%	10	144,924	25.26%	6	0	679,682	26.59%	28
Democratic Party	71,525	7.32%	3	88,557	8.81%	4	43,685	7.62%	2	0	203,767	7.97%	9
Janatha Vimukthi Peramuna	74,437	7.62%	3	56,405	5.61%	2	25,366	4.42%	1	0	156,208	6.11%	6
Democratic People's Front	44,156	4.52%	2	6,844	0.68%	0				0	51,000	2.00%	2
Sri Lanka Muslim Congress	20,163	2.06%	1	17,296	1.72%	1	12,056	2.10%	0	0	49,515	1.94%	2
All Ceylon Makkal Congress	15,491	1.58%	1							0	15,491	0.61%	1
Independents	12,776	1.31%	0	1,042	0.10%	0	2,295	0.40%	0	0	16,113	0.63%	0
Ceylon Workers' Congress	3,885	0.40%	0				4,331	0.75%	0	0	8,216	0.32%	0
Jana Setha Peramuna	967	0.10%	0	831	0.08%	0	1,011	0.18%	0	0	2,809	0.11%	0
United Lanka People's Party	1,283	0.13%	0	535	0.05%	0	255	0.04%	0	0	2,073	0.08%	0
Patriotic National Front	797	0.08%	0	395	0.04%	0	292	0.05%	0	0	1,484	0.06%	0
Nava Sama Samaja Party	1,061	0.11%	0	229	0.02%	0				0	1,290	0.05%	0
United Lanka Great Council	256	0.03%	0	530	0.05%	0	344	0.06%	0	0	1,130	0.04%	0
New Democratic Front	1,046	0.11%	0							0	1,046	0.04%	0
United Socialist Party							739	0.13%	0	0	739	0.03%	0
All Are Citizens, All Are Kings Organisation							375	0.07%	0	0	375	0.01%	0
Sri Lanka Labour Party	120	0.01%	0	155	0.02%	0	56	0.01%	0	0	331	0.01%	0
Our National Front	330	0.03%	0							0	330	0.01%	0
United Peace Front	292	0.03%	0							0	292	0.01%	0
New Sinhala Heritage				245	0.02%	0				0	245	0.01%	0
Socialist Equality Party	220	0.02%	0							0	220	0.01%	0
Valid Votes	977,426	100.00%	40	1,004,952	100.00%	40	573,653	100.00%	22	2	2,556,031	100.00%	104
Rejected Votes	43,762			40,713			28,810				113,285		
Total Polled	1,021,188			1,045,665			602,463				2,669,316		
Registered Electors	1,552,734			1,590,076			881,814				4,024,624		
Turnout	65.77%			65.76%			68.32%				66.32%		
