= Democratic Party (Sri Lanka) =

Democratic Party of Sri Lanka ප්‍රජාතන්ත්‍රවාදී පක්ෂය
- Founder: Sarath Fonseka
- Leader: Sarath Fonseka
- Founded: 1 April 2013
- Dissolved: 30 July 2016
- Merged into: United National Party
- Headquarters: 619, Waragoda Road, Kelaniya
- Ideology: Liberalism
- Political position: Centre

Election symbol
- Flaming Torch

Democratic Party was a political party in Sri Lanka led by former army chief Sarath Fonseka. It was registered by the election commission of Sri Lanka in March 2013.

== 2013 Provincial Council Elections ==
The Democratic Party contested for Provincial council elections held on 21 September 2013 for North, North Western & Central Provincial councils. They secured 3 & 2 seats of North western and Central Provincial councils obtaining 46,114 and 45,239 votes form respective provinces. They surprisingly emerged as third in both councils over JVP. However, they were unable to garner any support from North Provincial council where they obtained only 170 votes.

== 2014 Provincial Council Elections ==
Democratic Party contested for provincial council elections held on 29 March 2014 and secured 12 seats of two councils. In Southern council 75,532 votes obtaining 3 seats while in western province they got 203,767 votes obtaining 9 seats.

Democratic party got defeated badly in the Uva Provisional council election held on 20 September 2014. They could garner only 6076 votes from whole province which was 0.89%. This was a biggest setback for the newly established party.

== 2015 Presidential election ==
The Democratic Party has declared its support for the opposition common candidate Maithripala Sirisena. With the decision taken some appointed members left the party including Jayantha Ketagoda (MP).

== 2015 Parliamentary election ==
Party leader field marshal Sarath Fonseka announced he would contest alone for parliamentary election scheduled on 17 August 2015. Field Marshal Sarath Fonseka contested from the Colombo district. Surprisingly DP faced a massive slide in the election in which they could garner only 28,587 votes across the country, resulting in no representation in the 8th parliament of Sri Lanka.

== 2016 United National Front ==
The party joined governing United National Front for Good Governance signing an MOU with Prime Minister Ranil Wickramasinghe on 3 February 2016.

On 9 February Sarath Fonseka took oath as a member of parliament for the seat vacated by the death of M. K. A. D. S. Gunawardana giving the party a seat in the Parliament.

On 30 July Sarath Fonseka obtained membership of United National Party and Democratic party was dissolved accordingly.

== Electoral history ==
Sri Lanka Parliamentary Elections
Election year	Votes	Vote %	Seats won	+/–	Government
2015	28,587	0.26%	0 / 225	Steady	Not in Parliament
2024	283	0.00%	0 / 225	Steady	Not in Parliament
