= Jaffna District =

Jaffna District யாழ்ப்பாணம் மாவட்டம் යාපනය දිස්ත්‍රික්කය
- Administrative District
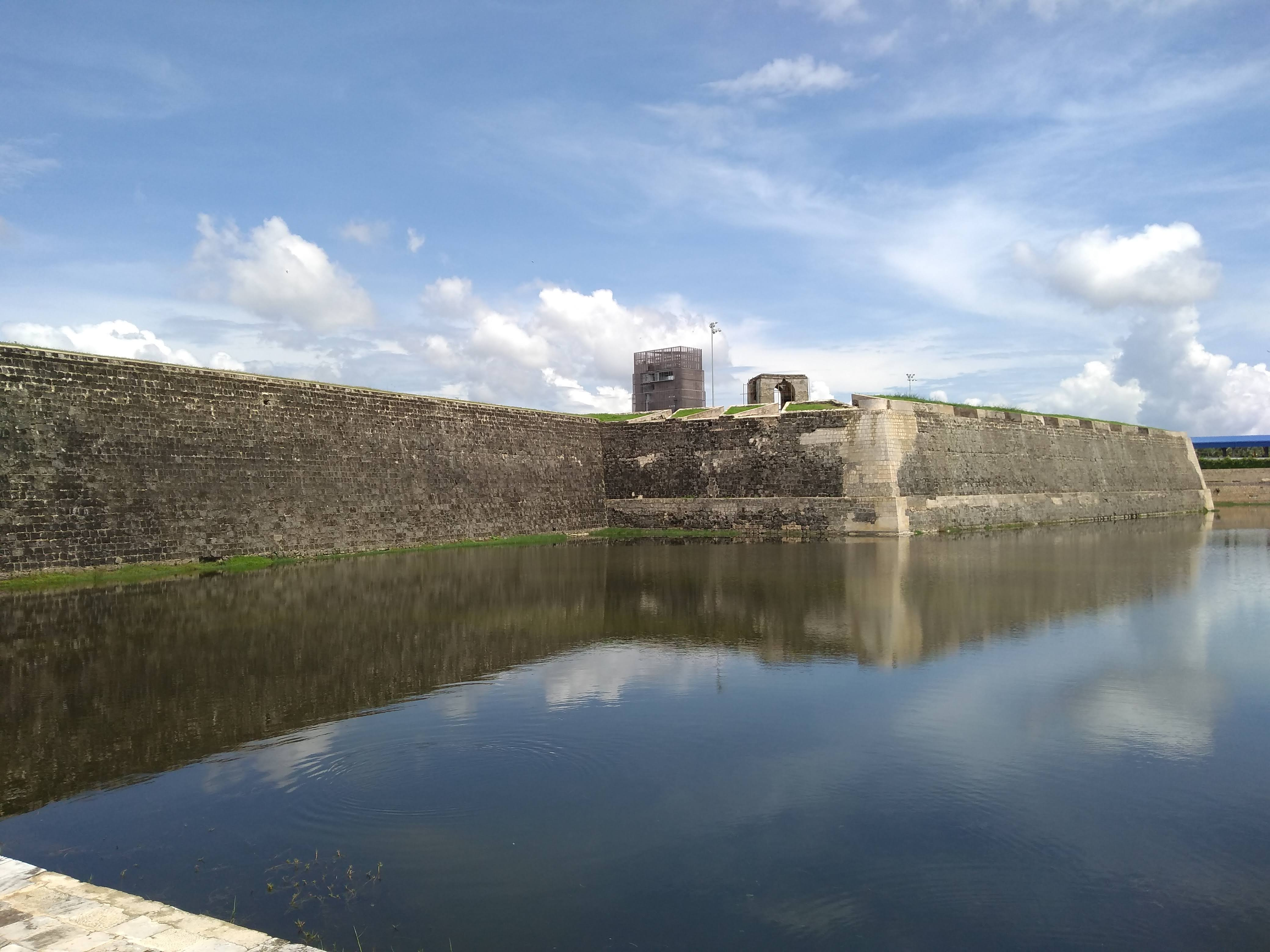
- Jaffna Fort

- Location within Sri Lanka
- Coordinates: 09°40′N 80°10′E
- Country: Sri Lanka
- Province: Northern
- Capital: Jaffna
- DS Division: List: Delft; Islands North; Islands South; Jaffna; Karativu; Nallur; Thenmarachchi; Vadamarachchi East; Vadamarachchi North; Vadamarachchi SW; Valikamam East; Valikamam North; Valikamam South; Valikamam SW; Valikamam West

Government
  - District Secretary: Kanapathipillai Mahesan
  - MPs: List: Silvestri Alantine; Murugesu Chandrakumar; Douglas Devananda; Vijayakala Maheswaran; Suresh Premachandran; E. Saravanapavan; Mavai Senathirajah; S. Sritharan; A. Vinayagamoorthy
  - MPCs: List: E. Arnold; P. Ayngaranesan; B. Gajatheepan; K. Kamalendran; Vinthan Kanagaratnam; A. Paranjothy; A. Ramanathan; K. Sarveswaran; Ananthi Sasitharan; K. Sayanthan; M. K. Shivajilingam; D. Siddarthan; C. V. K. Sivagnanam; V. Sivayogan; C. Sukirthan; C. V. Vigneswaran

Area
  - Total: 1,025 km^{2} (396 sq mi)
  - Land: 929 km^{2} (359 sq mi)
  - Water: 96 km^{2} (37 sq mi) 9.37%
  - Rank: 24th (1.56% of total area)

Population (2024 census)
  - Total: 594,751
  - Rank: 18th (2.73% of total pop.)
  - Density: 640/km^{2} (1,660/sq mi)

Ethnicity (2024 census)
  - Sri Lankan Tamil: 586,491 (98.61%)
  - Sinhalese: 3,395 (0.57%)
  - Sri Lankan Moors: 3,947 (0.66%)
  - Indian Tamil: 782 (0.13%)
  - Other: 136 (0.02%)

Religion (2024 census)
  - Hindu: 489,521 (82.30%)
  - Christian: 98,054 (16.49%)
  - Buddhist: 2,788 (0.47%)
  - Muslim: 4,352 (0.73%)
  - Other: 36 (0.01%)
- Time zone: UTC+05:30 (Sri Lanka)
- Post Codes: 40000-40999
- Telephone Codes: 021
- ISO 3166 code: LK-41
- Vehicle registration: NP
- Official Languages: Tamil, Sinhala
- Website: Jaffna District Secretariat

Jaffna District (Tamil: யாழ்ப்பாணம் மாவட்டம் Yāḻppāṇam Māvaṭṭam; Sinhala: යාපනය දිස්ත්‍රික්කය yāpanaya distrikkaya) is one of the 25 districts of Sri Lanka, the second level administrative division of the country. The district is administered by a District Secretariat headed by a District Secretary (previously known as a Government Agent) appointed by the central government of Sri Lanka. The capital of the district is the city of Jaffna.

== History ==
Between the 5th century BC and the 13th century AD present day Jaffna District was part of various Kingdoms such as Pandya, Chola, Pallava, Kalinga, and Rajarata. Jaffna District was thereafter part of the pre-colonial Jaffna kingdom. The district then came under Portuguese, Dutch and British control. In 1815 the British gained control of the entire island of Ceylon. They divided the island into three ethnic-based administrative structures: Low Country Sinhalese, Kandyan Sinhalese and Tamil. Jaffna District was part of the Tamil administration. In 1833, in accordance with the recommendations of the Colebrooke-Cameron Commission, the ethnic based administrative structures were unified into a single administration divided into five geographic provinces. Jaffna District, together with Mannar District and Vanni District, formed the new Northern Province. At the time that Ceylon gained independence, Jaffna was one of the three districts located in the Northern Province. Parts of the district were transferred to newly created Mullaitivu District in September 1978. Kilinochchi District was carved out of the southern part of Jaffna District in February 1984.

== Geography ==
Jaffna District is located in the far north of Sri Lanka in the Northern Province and occupies most of the Jaffna Peninsula. It has an area of 1,025 square kilometres (396 sq mi). It is divided into four areas geographically:

- Thenmarachchi or Thenmaradchi
- Vadamarachchi or Vadamaradchi
- Valikamam
- Jaffna Islands

== Administrative units ==
Jaffna District is divided into 15 Divisional Secretary's Division (DS Divisions), each headed by a Divisional Secretary (previously known as an Assistant Government Agent). The DS Divisions are further sub-divided into 435 Grama Niladhari Divisions (GN Divisions).

=== History ===
Most of the current divisions and their borders date back to Dutch colonial rule in the 18th century.

| DS Division | Main Town | Divisional Secretary | GN Divisions | Area (km^{2}) | Population (2012 Census) | | | | | | Population Density (/km^{2}) |
| DS Division | Main Town | Divisional Secretary | GN Divisions | Area (km^{2}) | Sri Lankan Tamil | Sinhalese | Sri Lankan Moors | Indian Tamil | Other | Total | Population Density (/km^{2}) |
|---|---|---|---|---|---|---|---|---|---|---|---|
| Delft | | A. Siri | 6 | 45 | 3,780 | 38 | 0 | 1 | 0 | 3,819 | 85 |
| Islands North | Kayts | Anton Yoganayagam | 15 | 30 | 9,846 | 129 | 3 | 19 | 0 | 9,997 | 333 |
| Islands South | Velanai | Manchulathevi Satheesan | 30 | 78 | 16,379 | 6 | 125 | 15 | 0 | 16,525 | 212 |
| Jaffna | Jaffna | Sugunarathy Theivendram | 28 | 17 | 48,413 | 504 | 1,682 | 104 | 56 | 50,759 | 2,986 |
| Karainagar | Karainagar | Thevanthini Babu | 9 | 22 | 9,533 | 0 | 0 | 9 | 2 | 9,544 | 434 |
| Nallur | Nallur | Palasingam Senthilnanthanan | 40 | 38 | 67,777 | 199 | 45 | 21 | 6 | 68,048 | 1,791 |
| Thenmarachchi | Chavakachcheri | Anjalidevi Santhaseelan | 60 | 221 | 64,162 | 247 | 62 | 169 | 45 | 64,685 | 293 |
| Vadamarachchi East | Maruthankerney | Nadarajah Thirulinganathan | 18 | 179 | 12,718 | 1 | 3 | 16 | 0 | 12,738 | 71 |
| Vadamarachchi North | Point Pedro | R. T. Jeyaseelan | 35 | 29 | 47,183 | 167 | 12 | 26 | 1 | 47,389 | 1,634 |
| Vadamarachchi South West | Karaveddy | S. Sivasri | 35 | 88 | 45,495 | 73 | 18 | 38 | 4 | 45,628 | 519 |
| Valikamam East | Kopay | Maruthalingam Pradeepan | 31 | 102 | 72,908 | 252 | 101 | 35 | 2 | 73,298 | 719 |
| Valikamam North | Tellippalai | Kanagarajah Shrimohanan | 45 | 57 | 28,179 | 1,336 | 21 | 4 | 6 | 29,546 | 518 |
| Valikamam South | Uduvil | M. Nanthagopalan | 30 | 30 | 52,574 | 190 | 44 | 25 | 0 | 52,833 | 1,761 |
| Valikamam South West | Sandilipay | Subramaniyam Muralitharan | 28 | 45 | 52,039 | 159 | 18 | 8 | 2 | 52,226 | 1,161 |
| Valikamam West | Chankanai | Shanmugarajah Balaruban | 25 | 44 | 46,260 | 65 | 5 | 9 | 4 | 46,343 | 1,053 |
| Total | | | 435 | 1,025 | 577,246 | 3,366 | 2,139 | 499 | 128 | 583,378 | 569 |

== Demographics ==
=== Population ===
Jaffna District's population was 583,378 in 2012. It is one of the most densely populated districts of Sri Lanka. The population of the district is almost exclusively Sri Lankan Tamil.

The population of the district, like the rest of the north and east of Sri Lanka, has been heavily affected by the civil war. The war killed an estimated 100,000 people. Several hundred thousand Sri Lankan Tamils, possibly as much as one million, emigrated to the West during the war. Many Sri Lankan Tamils also moved to the relative safety of the capital Colombo. Most of the Sri Lankan Moors and Sinhalese who lived in the district fled to other parts of Sri Lanka or were forcibly expelled by the rebel Liberation Tigers of Tamil Eelam.

=== Ethnicity ===
In 2024, Sri Lankan Tamils are the predominant ethnic group, making up 98.61% of the population.

Population of Jaffna District by ethnic group 1881 to 2024 (Note: Pre-1984 figures include Kilinochchi District which was carved out of the southern part of Jaffna district in February 1984.)
| Year | Tamil (Note: Sri Lankan Tamil and Indian Tamil.) | | Sinhalese | | Muslim (Note: Sri Lankan Moors and Indian Moors.) | | Other | | Total No. |
| Year | No. | % | No. | % | No. | % | No. | % | Total No. |
|---|---|---|---|---|---|---|---|---|---|
| 1881 Census | 261,902 | 98.61% | 80 | 0.03% | 2,648 | 1.00% | 953 | 0.36% | 265,583 |
| 1891 Census | 275,227 | 98.55% | 131 | 0.05% | 3,049 | 1.09% | 877 | 0.31% | 279,284 |
| 1901 Census | 296,805 | 98.66% | 226 | 0.08% | 3,078 | 1.02% | 742 | 0.25% | 300,851 |
| 1911 Census | 321,908 | 98.53% | 403 | 0.12% | 3,485 | 1.07% | 916 | 0.28% | 326,712 |
| 1921 Census | 324,874 | 98.29% | 1,042 | 0.32% | 3,748 | 1.13% | 877 | 0.27% | 330,541 |
| 1946 Census | 413,264 | 97.29% | 4,546 | 1.07% | 5,620 | 1.32% | 1,358 | 0.32% | 424,788 |
| 1963 Census | 597,920 | 97.50% | 5,630 | 0.92% | 8,600 | 1.40% | 1,080 | 0.18% | 613,230 |
| 1971 Census | 673,043 | 95.56% | 20,402 | 2.90% | 10,312 | 1.46% | 593 | 0.08% | 704,350 |
| 1981 Census | 812,247 | 97.73% | 4,615 | 0.56% | 13,757 | 1.66% | 493 | 0.06% | 831,112 |
| 1997 Estimate | n/a | n/a | n/a | n/a | n/a | n/a | n/a | n/a | 466,937 |
| 1998 Estimate | n/a | n/a | n/a | n/a | n/a | n/a | n/a | n/a | 457,264 |
| 1999 Estimate | n/a | n/a | n/a | n/a | n/a | n/a | n/a | n/a | 491,007 |
| 2000 Estimate | n/a | n/a | n/a | n/a | n/a | n/a | n/a | n/a | 502,356 |
| 2001 Estimate (Note: 2001 Census was not carried out in Jaffna District.) | 541,133 | 99.95% | 49 | 0.01% | 201 | 0.04% | 0 | 0.00% | 541,383 |
| 2002 Estimate | n/a | n/a | n/a | n/a | n/a | n/a | n/a | n/a | 574,164 |
| 2003 Estimate | 590,299 | 99.74% | 40 | 0.01% | 1,241 | 0.21% | 248 | 0.04% | 591,828 |
| 2004 Estimate | 583,064 | 99.73% | 88 | 0.02% | 1,384 | 0.24% | 131 | 0.02% | 584,667 |
| 2005 Estimate | 595,651 | 99.69% | 75 | 0.01% | 1,705 | 0.29% | 69 | 0.01% | 597,500 |
| 2006 Estimate | 650,339 | 99.72% | 54 | 0.01% | 1,725 | 0.26% | 66 | 0.01% | 652,184 |
| 2007 Enumeration | 559,188 | 99.92% | 67 | 0.01% | 350 | 0.06% | 14 | 0.00% | 559,619 |
| 2008 Estimate | 559,665 | 99.91% | 29 | 0.01% | 452 | 0.08% | 50 | 0.01% | 560,196 |
| 2009 Estimate | 623,841 | 99.87% | 26 | 0.00% | 777 | 0.12% | 0 | 0.00% | 624,644 |
| 2011 Enumeration | 564,455 | 99.51% | 746 | 0.13% | 1,874 | 0.33% | 154 | 0.03% | 567,229 |
| 2012 Census | 577,745 | 99.03% | 3,366 | 0.58% | 2,139 | 0.37% | 128 | 0.02% | 583,378 |
| 2024 Census | 586,491 | 98.61% | 3,395 | 0.57% | 3,947 | 0.66% | 918 | 0.15% | 594,751 |

=== Religion ===
Population of Jaffna District by religion 1971 to 2024
| Year | Hindu | | Christian (Note: Roman Catholic and Other Christian.) | | Buddhist | | Muslim | | Others | | Total No. |
| Year | No. | % | No. | % | No. | % | No. | % | No. | % | Total No. |
|---|---|---|---|---|---|---|---|---|---|---|---|
| 1971 Census | 585,418 | 83.11% | 85,031 | 12.08% | 18,210 | 2.59% | 15,520 | 2.20% | 171 | 0.02% | 704,350 |
| 1981 Census | 705,705 | 84.97% | 104,766 | 12.61% | 5,104 | 0.61% | 14,844 | 1.79% | 133 | 0.02% | 830,552 |
| 2008 Estimate | 484,308 | 86.45% | 75,357 | 13.45% | 29 | 0.01% | 452 | 0.08% | 50 | 0.01% | 560,196 |
| 2012 Census | 483,900 | 82.95% | 94,146 | 16.14% | 2,533 | 0.43% | 2,455 | 0.42% | 344 | 0.06% | 583,378 |
| 2024 Census | 489,521 | 82.30% | 98,054 | 16.49% | 2,788 | 0.47% | 4,352 | 0.73% | 36 | 0.01% | 594,751 |

== Education ==
- Nagarkovil Maha Vidyalayam

== Politics and government ==
=== Local government ===
Jaffna District has 17 local authorities of which one is a Municipal Council, three are Urban Councils and the remaining 13 are Divisional Councils (Pradesha Sabhai or Pradeshiya Sabha).

| Local Authority | Area (km^{2}) | Population (2011) | Registered Electors (2011) (Note: 2009 for Jaffna Municipal Council.) | Elected Members (2011) (Note: 2009 for Jaffna Municipal Council.) | | | | |
| Local Authority | Area (km^{2}) | Population (2011) | Registered Electors (2011) | TNA (Note: Includes TULF.) | UPFA | UNP | Other | Total |
|---|---|---|---|---|---|---|---|---|
| Chavakacheri Divisional Council | 200.90 | 48,166 | 37,015 | 12 | 2 | 1 | 0 | 15 |
| Chavakacheri Urban Council | 31.29 | 15,780 | 10,987 | 9 | 2 | 0 | 0 | 11 |
| Delft Divisional Council | 47.16 | 3,861 | 3,085 | 1 | 8 | 0 | 0 | 9 |
| Jaffna Municipal Council | 20.20 | 76,080 | 100,417 | 9 | 13 | 0 | 1 | 23 |
| Karainagar Divisional Council | 21.74 | 9,505 | 8,140 | 3 | 1 | 1 | 0 | 5 |
| Kayts Divisional Council | 45.11 | 10,534 | 6,349 | 1 | 4 | 0 | 0 | 5 |
| Nallur Divisional Council | 20.59 | 36,472 | 22,012 | 10 | 2 | 0 | 0 | 12 |
| Point Pedro Divisional Council | 220.00 | 39,651 | 25,375 | 7 | 2 | 0 | 0 | 9 |
| Point Pedro Urban Council | 4.62 | 12,161 | 7,376 | 7 | 2 | 0 | 0 | 9 |
| Vadamarachchi South West Divisional Council | 68.95 | 45,386 | 32,539 | 15 | 3 | 0 | 0 | 18 |
| Valikamam East Divisional Council | 102.20 | 70,064 | 46,570 | 16 | 5 | 0 | 0 | 21 |
| Valikamam North Divisional Council | 58.50 | 26,049 | 63,224 | 15 | 6 | 0 | 0 | 21 |
| Valikamam South Divisional Council | 33.26 | 51,612 | 32,857 | 13 | 3 | 0 | 0 | 16 |
| Valikamam South West Divisional Council | 55.24 | 50,971 | 31,022 | 12 | 4 | 0 | 0 | 16 |
| Valikamam West Divisional Council | 47.30 | 45,983 | 30,214 | 11 | 3 | 0 | 0 | 14 |
| Valvettithurai Urban Council | 5.36 | 8,382 | 5,550 | 7 | 2 | 0 | 0 | 9 |
| Velanai Divisional Council | 94.80 | 16,572 | 12,028 | 3 | 8 | 0 | 0 | 11 |
| Total | 1,077.22 | 567,229 | | 151 | 70 | 2 | 1 | 224 |

== Twinned Regions ==
On 18 October 2016, Jaffna District twinned with the Royal Borough of Kingston upon Thames in London. The twinning was intended to build “greater understanding and sharing knowledge” in the fields of governance, healthcare and education.
