= 2009 Sri Lankan local elections =

- 8 August 2009

34 seats across 2 local authorities
- Turnout: 28.09%
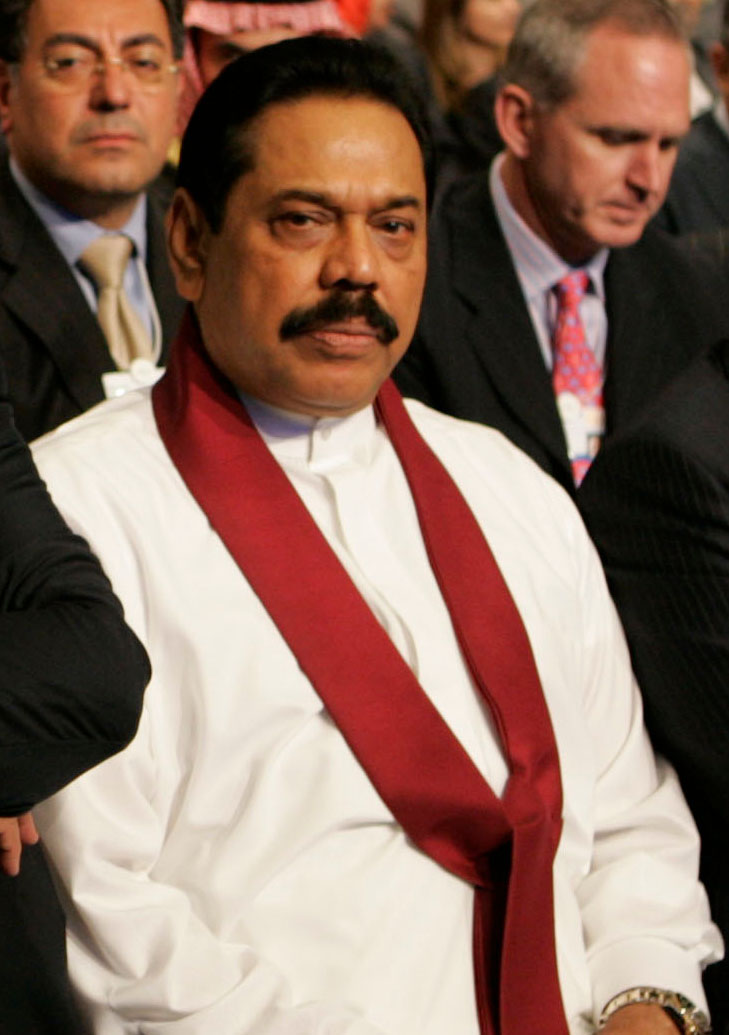

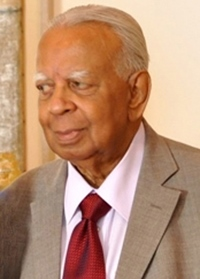
	First party	Second party
Leader	Mahinda Rajapaksa	R. Sampanthan
Party	UPFA	TNA
Popular vote	13,647	12,287
Percentage	41.09%	36.99%
Councillors	15	13
Councils	1	0

Local elections were held in Sri Lanka on 8 August 2009 for two local councils in the north of the country: Jaffna Municipal Council and Vavuniya Urban Council. They were the first elections held in the country since the government declared victory in the 26-year-old civil war on 18 May 2009. They were also the first local elections held in the Northern Province in more than 11 years. Both towns had been under government control for many years. The government won the Jaffna Municipal Council contest by securing 13 of the 23 seats. The Tamil National Alliance (TNA) won the Vavuniya Urban Council contest by securing 5 of the 11 seats. Turnout was very low in Jaffna (22%) but it was better in Vavuniya (52%).

== Background ==
On 25 May 2009 the government announced that local elections would be held in Jaffna and Vavuniya. Nominations took place between 18 June 2009 and 25 June 2009. After the nominations closed the Sri Lankan Department of Election announced that the elections would take place on 8 August 2009, the same day as the Uva Provincial Council elections.

The TNA has said that the elections are being held too early, with so many of the electorate displaced. It expected the Jaffna elections to be violent and the results to be rigged, just like the 2008 Eastern Provincial Council elections. The United National Party (UNP) and the People's Action for Free and Fair Election (PAFFREL) have called on the election authorities to bring in foreign election observers.

== Violence, intimidation and other irregularities ==
Veerasingham Anandasangaree, president of the Tamil United Liberation Front (TULF), has accused a Tamil government minister of "terrorising the residents of Jaffna in the run-up to the Municipal Council elections". It is believed that the minister Anandasangaree was referring to is Douglas Devananda, leader of the paramilitary Eelam People's Democratic Party (EPDP).

The UNP has accused the government of obstructing the UNP's campaign in Jaffna and Vavuniya. It says the government is preventing its free movement and has complained to the Election Department. The UNP has also accused armed supporters of the EPDP of threatening its candidates. It has said that the EPDP is using state resources, such as the police, in its election campaigns.

In the early hours of 25 June 2009 armed men attacked newspaper delivery men and burnt thousands of copies of three Tamil language newspapers (Thinakkural, Uthayan and Valampuri) in Jaffna. The newspapers had refused to print a statement attacking the Tamil Tigers from a shadowy group calling itself the "Tamil Front Protecting the Country". The group telephoned the Thinakkural after the attack and warned that the newspapers would continue to be confiscated and torched until the statement was published. The newspaper published the statement under duress on 26 June 2009.

On 27 June 2009 the group issued further threats against the Uthayan, this time ordering all its staff to resign by 30 June 2009 or face death.

On 4 July 2009 two men were shot and killed by unidentified gunmen in the Parathipuram area of Vavuniya. The dead men were identified as 39-year-old Nadaraja Ramesh Kantha, principal of Parathipuram Tamil Mixed School, and 31-year-old Gunarathnam Peter Ruben.

== Jaffna Municipal Council ==
2009 Jaffna Municipal Council election
- 8 August 2009

All 23 council seats of the Jaffna Municipal Council 12 seats needed for a majority
- Turnout: 22.19%
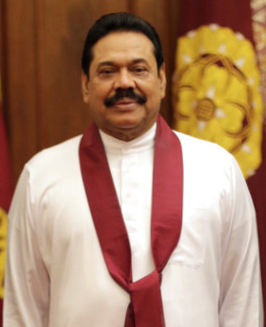

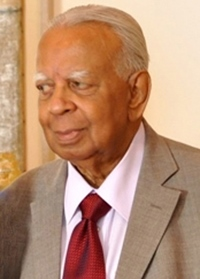
	First party	Second party
Leader	Mahinda Rajapaksa	R. Sampanthan
Party	UPFA	TNA
Last election	New	New
Seats won	13	8
Seat change	▲13	▲8
Popular vote	10,602	8,008
Percentage	50.67%	38.28%
council control before election
None
Subsequent council control
UPFA

The last election for Jaffna MC was held on 29 January 1998.

The following six alliances / parties / independent groups' nominations were accepted by the Sri Lankan Department of Election:

- Tamil National Alliance
- Tamil United Liberation Front
- United National Party
- United People's Freedom Alliance
- Independent Group 1 (displaced Muslims)
- Independent Group 2 (Abimanasingham Manickasothy)

A total of 174 candidates competed for the 23 seats available on the council.

The nominations of the Sri Lanka Muslim Congress (SLMC) and an independent group (Arumugam Sellathurai) were rejected by the Sri Lankan Department of Election. The SLMC appealed to the Supreme Court of Sri Lanka but on 3 July the courts rejected the appeal. There were approximately 10,000 Muslim refugees from Jaffna living in other districts. Of these 7,104 applied to vote in the Jaffna elections. With the elimination of the SLMC and the UNP not fielding any Muslim candidates, most of the Muslims would most likely have voted for the United People's Freedom Alliance.

Extraordinarily there were no applications by Tamil refugees to vote in the Jaffna elections. There are hundreds of thousands of Tamil refugees from the Jaffna Peninsula living in other parts of the country, either in refugee camps or with relatives. Many of these are from the Jaffna municipality area.

Veteran politician Veerasingham Anandasangaree is a candidate to become Mayor of Jaffna. Anandasangaree was a TNA Member of Parliament but left the TNA when it started taking a pro-Tamil Tiger stance. Since then he has reconstituted the TULF, a constituent party of the TNA, as a separate political party and formed alliances with government-backed anti-Tamil Tigers paramilitary groups, such as the People's Liberation Organisation of Tamil Eelam (PLOTE), in order to fight elections against the TNA. Most TULF members however remain within the TNA.

=== Results ===
The government (UPFA) took control of the Jaffna Municipal Council after securing 13 of the 23 seats.

Alliances and parties	Votes	%	Seats
United People's Freedom Alliance: All Ceylon Muslim Congress; Eelam People's Democratic Party; Eelavar Democratic Front (Eelam Revolutionary Organisation of Students); Sri Lanka Freedom Party; Tamil Eelam Liberation Organization (Sri Sabaratnam Wing)	10,602	50.67%	13
Tamil National Alliance: All Ceylon Tamil Congress; Eelam People's Revolutionary Liberation Front (Suresh wing); Illankai Tamil Arasu Kachchi; Tamil Eelam Liberation Organization	8,008	38.28%	8
Independent Group 1	1,175	5.62%	1
Tamil United Liberation Front: Eelam People's Revolutionary Liberation Front (Varathar wing); People's Liberation Organisation of Tamil Eelam; Tamil United Liberation Front	1,007	4.81%	1
United National Party	83	0.40%	0
Independent Group 2	47	0.22%	0
Valid Votes	20,922	100.00%	23
Rejected Votes	1,358		
Total Polled	22,280		
Registered Electors	100,417		
Turnout	22.19%		

The following candidates were elected:

No.	Elected Candidate	Party	Preference Votes
22	Mudiyappu Remediyas	TNA	4,223
12	Thurairajah Illango alias Regan	UPFA (EPDP)	3,387
1	Mohamed Sultan Moulavi Sufian	Ind 1	1,779
1	Anthonypillai Mariamma	TNA	1,678
20	Murugiah Komahan	UPFA (EPDP)	1,573
10	Karthigesu Nadarasa Kanagaratnam	TNA	1,442
3	Manuel Mangaleswaran alias Nesapriyan	UPFA (EPDP)	1,394
19	Meerasahib Mohamed Rameez	UPFA (ACMC)	1,338
14	Patkunam Yogeswary	UPFA (EPDP)	1,250
16	Pilevian Expedith Cracian	UPFA (EPDP)	1,166
17	Nadarajah Rajathevan	TNA	1,118
19	Benjamin Jacob	TNA	1,039
21	Mohamed Merasahib Mustafa	UPFA (ACMC)	1,029
18	Manikkam Kanagaraththinam	UPFA (EPDP)	1,025
3	Ariyakuddy Paramsothy	TNA	1,007
26	Sutharsingh Vijiyakanth	UPFA (EPDP)	989
4	Asker Roomi Badurtheen	UPFA (ACMC)	979
1	Ajmaeen Asfar	UPFA (ACMC)	960
27	Suvikaran Nishanthan	UPFA (EPDP)	896
2	Anthonipillai Cilapotasious	UPFA (EPDP)	889
21	Mariyakorattry Anton	TNA	881
5	Arulappu Korneliyas	TNA	826
1	Veerasingham Anandasangaree	TULF	424

The EPDP has nominated Patkunam Yogeswary to be Mayor and Thurairajah Illango to be Deputy Mayor.

== Vavuniya Urban Council ==
The last election for Vavuniya UC was held on 1 March 1994.

The following nine alliances / parties / independent groups' nominations were accepted by the Sri Lankan Department of Election:

- Democratic People's Liberation Front
- Sri Lanka Muslim Congress
- Sri Lanka Progressive Front
- Tamil National Alliance
- United National Party
- United People's Freedom Alliance
- Independent Group 1
- Independent Group 2
- Independent Group 3

A total of 135 candidates competed for the 11 seats available on the council.

The TULF (Anandasangaree wing) filed a separate nomination but this was rejected by the Sri Lankan Department of Election.

=== Results ===
The Tamil National Alliance (TNA) secured 5 of the 11 seats, making it the largest group on Vavuniya Urban Council. The TNA is seeking SLMC support to form a majority administration. The TNA's victory in Vavuniya was seen as a surprise by international observers because many people had predicted the end of the TNA following the LTTE's military defeat.

Alliances and parties	Votes	%	Seats
Tamil National Alliance: All Ceylon Tamil Congress; Eelam People's Revolutionary Liberation Front (Suresh wing); Illankai Tamil Arasu Kachchi; Tamil Eelam Liberation Organization	4,279	34.81%	5
Democratic People's Liberation Front: Eelam People's Revolutionary Liberation Front (Varathar wing); People's Liberation Organisation of Tamil Eelam; Tamil United Liberation Front	4,136	33.65%	3
United People's Freedom Alliance: All Ceylon Muslim Congress; Eelam People's Democratic Party; Eelavar Democratic Front (Eelam Revolutionary Organisation of Students); Sri Lanka Freedom Party; Tamil Eelam Liberation Organization (Sri Sabaratnam Wing)	3,045	24.77%	2
Sri Lanka Muslim Congress	587	4.78%	1
United National Party	228	1.85%	0
Sri Lanka Progressive Front	10	0.08%	0
Independent Group 1	6	0.05%	0
Independent Group 3	1	0.01%	0
Independent Group 2	0	0.00%	0
Valid Votes	12,292	100.00%	11
Rejected Votes	558		
Total Polled	12,850		
Registered Electors	24,626		
Turnout	52.18%		

The following candidates were elected:

No.	Elected Candidate	Party	Preference Votes
2	Kanthar Thamotharampillai Linganathan	DPLF	2,958
14	Muttu Sivasami Muguntharathan	TNA	2,551
1	Abdul Pari Muhammadu Sareep	UPFA	2,270
5	Rathinasigam Sivakumar	TNA	1,105
7	S. N. G. Nathan	TNA	1,099
13	Sundaram Kumarasamy	DPLF	962
5	Jayasekara Arachchige Dhammika Lalith Jayasekara	UPFA	952
15	Sellaththurai Surenthiran	TNA	858
3	Kandasamy Partheepan	DPLF	834
1	Iyaththurai Kanagiah	TNA	791
2	Abdul Latif Mohamed Munawfar	SLMC	665

The TNA has nominated S. N. G. Nathan to be Chairman and Muttu Sivasami Muguntharathan to be Deputy Mayor.
