= Government of the Northern Province, Sri Lanka =

Provincial administration in northern Sri Lanka

The Government of the Northern Province refers to the provincial government of the Northern Province of Sri Lanka. Under the Sri Lankan constitution the nine provincial governments of the country have power over a variety of matters including agriculture, education, health, housing, local government, planning, road transport and social services. The constitution also gives them powers over police and land but successive central governments have refused to devolve these powers to the provinces. Legislative power rests with the Northern Provincial Council whilst executive power rests with the Governor and Board of Ministers.

== History ==
In an attempt to end the Sri Lankan Civil War the Indo-Lanka Accord was signed on 29 July 1987. One of the requirements of the accord was that the Sri Lankan government should devolve powers to the provinces. Accordingly, on 14 November 1987 the Sri Lankan Parliament passed the 13th Amendment to the Constitution of Sri Lanka and the Provincial Councils Act No 42 of 1987. On 3 February 1988 nine provincial councils were created by order. The first elections for provincial councils took place on 28 April 1988 in North Central, North Western, Sabaragamuwa, and Uva provinces. On 2 June 1988 elections were held for provincial councils for Central, Southern and Western provinces.

The Indo-Lanka Accord also required the merger of the Eastern and Northern provinces into one administrative unit. The accord required a referendum to be held by 31 December 1988 in the Eastern Province to decide whether the merger should be permanent. Crucially, the accord allowed the Sri Lankan president to postpone the referendum at his discretion. On September 2 and 8 1988 President Jayewardene issued proclamations enabling the Eastern and Northern provinces to be one administrative unit administered by one elected council, creating the North Eastern Province. Elections in the newly merged North Eastern Province were held on 19 November 1988. The Eelam People's Revolutionary Liberation Front, an Indian backed paramilitary group, won control of the North Eastern provincial council.

On 1 March 1990, just as the Indian Peace Keeping Force were preparing to withdraw from Sri Lanka, Annamalai Varatharajah Perumal, Chief Minister of the North Eastern Province, moved a motion in the North Eastern Provincial Council declaring an independent Eelam. President Premadasa reacted to Permual's UDI by dissolving the provincial council and imposing direct rule on the province.

The proclamations issued by President Jayewardene in September 1988 merging the Northern and Eastern provinces were only meant to be a temporary measure until a referendum was held in the Eastern Province on a permanent merger between the two provinces. However, the referendum was never held and successive Sri Lankan presidents issued proclamations annually extending the life of the "temporary" entity. The merger was bitterly opposed by Sri Lankan nationalists. The combined North Eastern Province occupied one third of Sri Lanka. The thought of the rebel Tamil Tigers controlling this province, directly or indirectly, alarmed them greatly. On 14 July 2006, after a long campaign against the merger, the Janatha Vimukthi Peramuna filed three separate petitions with the Supreme Court of Sri Lanka requesting a separate Provincial Council for the East. On 16 October 2006 the Supreme Court ruled that the proclamations issued by President Jayewardene were null and void and had no legal effect. The North Eastern Province was formally de-merged into the Eastern and Northern provinces on 1 January 2007. The Northern province was ruled directly from Colombo (via the centrally appointed governor) until 21 September 2013 when elections were held.

== Legislature ==
Under the Sri Lankan constitution provincial councils such as the Northern Provincial Council may enact statutes in respect of matters on List I of the Ninth Schedule ("the Provincial Council List"). Matters on this list include agriculture, education, health, housing, local government, planning, road transport and social services. Police and land are also on this list but successive central governments have refused to devolve these powers to the provinces. Provincial councils may also enact statutes in respect of matters on List III of the Ninth Schedule ("the Concurrent List") after consulting the national Parliament. Matters on this list include archaeological sites, employment, environmental protection, fisheries, higher education, price control and tourism.

The Northern Provincial Council has 38 members elected using the open list proportional representation system. The first election for the council took place on 21 September 2013. The Tamil National Alliance (TNA), the largest party representing the Sri Lankan Tamils, won 30 of the 38 seats. The United People's Freedom Alliance (UPFA), which was in power nationally, became the second largest group after winning 7 seats. The Sri Lanka Muslim Congress (SLMC) won the remaining seat.

Alliance	Votes	%	Seats
Tamil National Alliance	353,595	78.48%	30
United People's Freedom Alliance	82,838	18.38%	7
Sri Lanka Muslim Congress	6,761	1.50%	1
Others	7,380	1.64%	0
Total	450,574	100.00%	38

The maximum term of the provincial council is 5 years from the date of its first meeting.

== Executive ==
Executive power over matters which the provincial council may enact statutes rests with the Governor who exercises these powers through a Board of Ministers.

=== Governor ===
The Governor is appointed by the President of Sri Lanka for a period of five years. The Governor has the power to prorogue and dissolve the provincial council. The Governor appoints, from amongst the members of the provincial council, the Chief Minister and, on the advice of the Chief Minister, the remaining members of the Board of Ministers from amongst the members of the provincial council.

The current Governor of the Northern Province G. A. Chandrasiri was appointed by President Mahinda Rajapaksa and took office on 12 July 2009. Major General Chandrasiri had previously been commander of Jaffna Security Forces, the regional army command for the Jaffna Peninsula. This has led to Chandrasiri being labelled a "military governor". Chandrasiri's military background and his open support for the United People's Freedom Alliance have resulted in the Tamil National Alliance and the United National Party calling for him to be replaced by a "civilian governor".

=== Board of Ministers ===
The Board of Ministers consists of the Chief Minister and up to four other ministers. The job of the Board of Ministers is to aid and advise governor in the exercise of his functions. The Northern Province did not have a Board of Ministers until after the provincial council election in 2013.

The current Board of Ministers consists of the Chief Minister and four ministers who took office in October 2013. The current Chief Minister C. V. Vigneswaran was appointed by Governor Chandrasiri on 1 October 2013. Vigneswaran took his chief ministerial oath in front of President Rajapaksa at the Presidential Secretariat on 7 October 2013. The four other ministers took their oaths in front of Vigneswaran at Veerasingam Hall on 11 October 2013. Vigneswaran took his ministerial oath in front of President Rajapaksa at the Presidential Secretariat on 17 October 2013.

	Party	Minister	Office	Ministry	In office since	Secretary	Website
1	ITAK	C. V. Vigneswaran	Chief Minister		7 October 2013		
1	ITAK	C. V. Vigneswaran	Minister of Finance and Planning, Law and Order, Lands, Electricity, Housing and Construction, Tourism, Local Government, Provincial Administration, Rural Development, Road Development, Motor Traffic and Transport	Finance and Planning, Law and Order, Lands, Electricity, Housing and Construction, Tourism, Local Government, Provincial Administration, Rural Development, Road Development, Motor Traffic and Transport	23 August 2017	R. Varathalingam	
2	TELO	G. Gunaseelan	Minister of Health and Indigenous Medicine and Probation and Childcare Services	Health and Indigenous Medicine and Probation and Childcare Services	23 August 2017	S. Thiruvakaran	
3	EPRLF	K. Sarveswaran	Minister of Education, Sports and Youth Affairs and Cultural Affairs	29 June 2017	R. Raveenthiran		
4	ITAK	Ananthi Sasitharan	Minister of Women Affairs, Rehabilitation, Social Service, Co-operatives, Food Supply and Distribution, Industries and Enterprise Promotion and Trade and Commerce	Women Affairs, Rehabilitation, Social Service, Co-operatives, Food Supply and Distribution, Industries and Enterprise Promotion and Trade and Commerce	23 August 2017	R. Varatheeswaran	
5	PLOTE	K. Sivanesan	Minister of Agriculture and Agrarian Services, Animal Husbandry, Irrigation, Fisheries, Water Supply and Environment	Agriculture and Agrarian Services, Animal Husbandry, Irrigation, Fisheries, Water Supply and Environment	23 August 2017	S. Sathiyaseelan	healthnp.org
