= List of chief ministers of Northern Province =

Chief Minister of Northern Province
- வட மாகாண முதலமைச்சர்
- Flag of Northern Province
- Incumbent; Vacant since 23 October 2018
- Board of Ministers of the Northern Province
- Style: The Honourable
- Member of: Northern Provincial Council
- Appointer: G. A. Chandrasiri
- Precursor: Chief Minister of the North Eastern Province
- Inaugural holder: C. V. Vigneswaran
- Formation: 1 January 2007
- Website: Northern Province Chief Minister's Office

The chief minister of Northern Province, Sri Lanka, is the head of the provincial board of ministers, a body which aids and advises the governor, the head of the provincial government, in the exercise of his executive power. The governor appoints as chief minister the member of the Northern Provincial Council who, in his opinion, commands the support of a majority of that council.

== Chief ministers ==
Illankai Tamil Arasu Kachchi

No.	Name	Portrait	Party	Took office	Left office	Refs
	Vacant (Note: Governed directly by the Central government)			1 January 2007	7 October 2013	
1	C. V. Vigneswaran		Illankai Tamil Arasu Kachchi	7 October 2013	23 October 2018	
	Vacant (Note: Governed directly by the Central government)			23 October 2018		
