= Veerasingam Hall =

- வீரசிங்கம் மண்டபம்
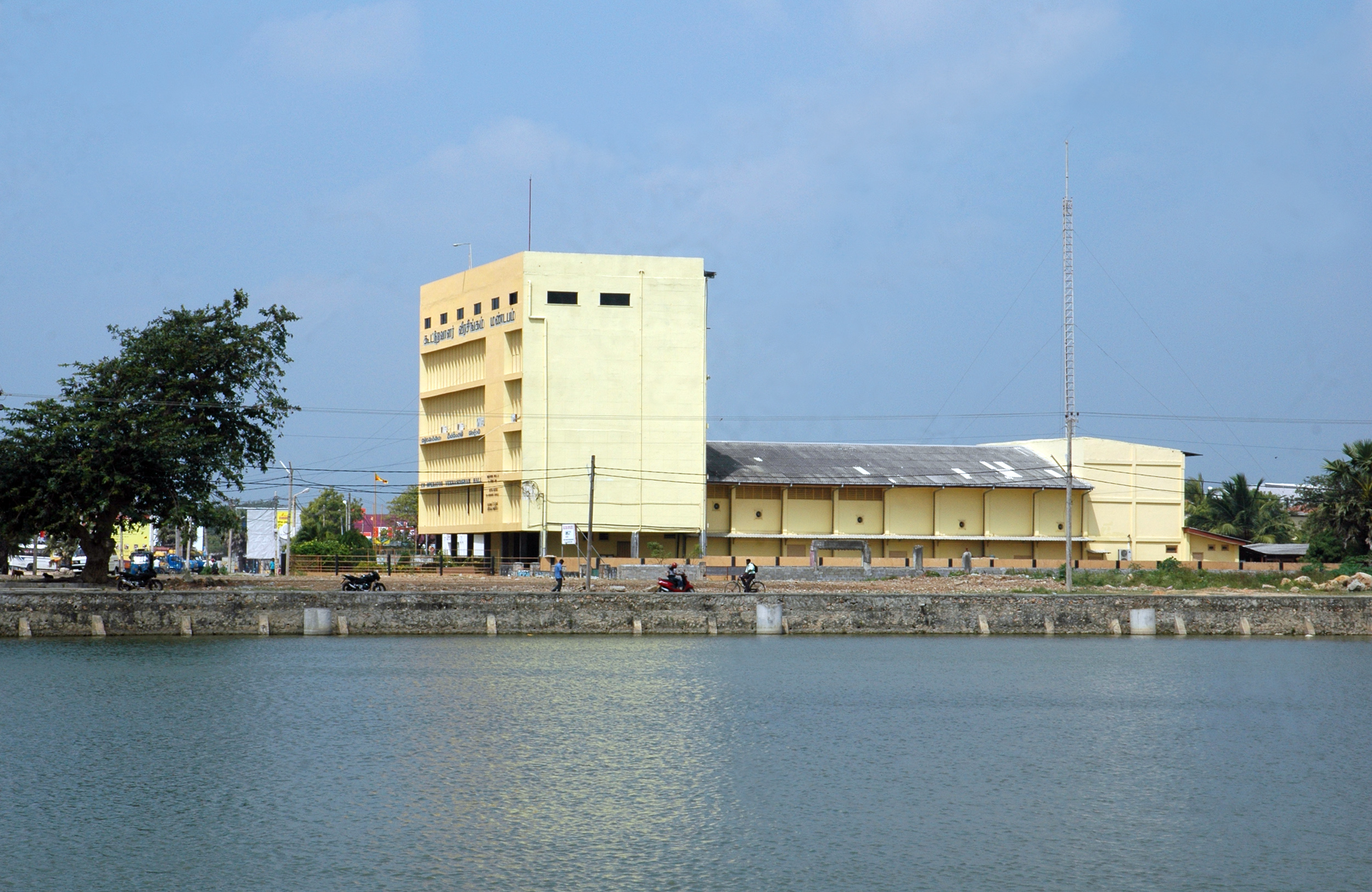

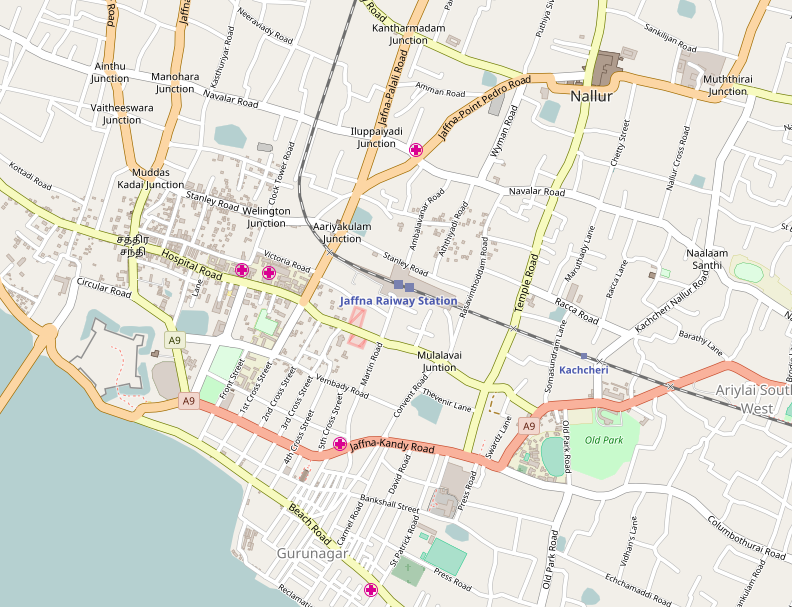
- Location within Central Jaffna

General information
- Location: K. K. S. Road, Jaffna, Sri Lanka
- Coordinates: 9°39′52.70″N 80°0′38.20″E
- Owner: Jaffna District Co-operative Council

Co-operator Veerasingam Hall (Tamil: கூட்டுறவாளர் வீரசிங்கம் மண்டபம், Sinhala: වීරසිංහම් ශාලාව; commonly known as Veerasingam Hall) is a public hall/office building in the city of Jaffna in northern Sri Lanka. The hall is the main venue for conferences, conventions and cultural events in the north of the country. It was named after V. Veerasingam, the first president of the Federation of Co-operative Societies, Jaffna District. Veerasingam had been principal of Manipay Hindu College before becoming MP for Vaddukoddai.
