= C. V. Vigneswaran =

Sri Lankan politician

C. V. Vigneswaran MP PC
- க. வி. விக்னேஸ்வரன் සී. වී. විග්නේෂ්වරන්
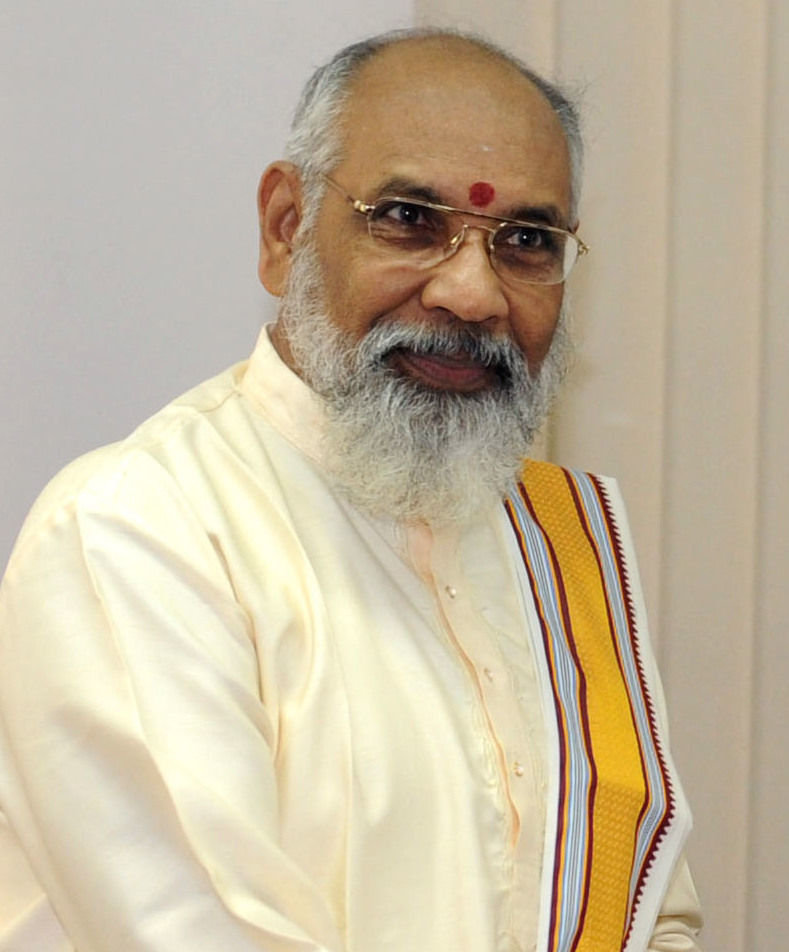
- Vigneswaran in March 2015

Member of the Parliament of Sri Lanka
- In office 20 August 2020 – 24 August 2024
- Constituency: Jaffna District

1st Chief Minister of the Northern Province
- In office 7 October 2013 – 23 October 2018

Member of the Northern Provincial Council
- In office 2013–2018
- Constituency: Jaffna District

Puisne Justice of the Supreme Court of Sri Lanka
- In office March 2001 – October 2004
- Appointed by: Chandrika Kumaratunga

Personal details
- Born: Canagasabapathy Visuvalingam Vigneswaran; 23 October 1939 (age 86) Colombo, Ceylon
- Party: Tamil People's Alliance
- Other political affiliations: Tamil People's National Alliance
- Education: University of Ceylon; Ceylon Law College
- Profession: Lawyer

Canagasabapathy Visuvalingam Vigneswaran, PC (Tamil: கனகசபாபதி விசுவலிங்கம் விக்னேஸ்வரன், romanized: Kaṉakacapāpati Vicuvaliṅkam Vikṉēsvaraṉ; Sinhala: කනකසභාපති විශ්වලිංගම් විග්නේෂ්වරන්; born 23 October 1939) is a Sri Lankan Tamil lawyer, judge, politician and Member of Parliament. After practising law for more than 15 years, Vigneswaran was a member of the judiciary for 25 years. He was a magistrate and a judge of the District Court, High Court, Court of Appeal and Supreme Court. He was Chief Minister of the Northern Province from October 2013 to October 2018. He was elected to the Parliament of Sri Lanka in August 2020. Vigneswaran is leader of the Tamil People's Alliance and the Tamil People's National Alliance.

== Early life and family ==
Vigneswaran was born on 23 October 1939 in Hulftsdorp, Colombo, the capital of Ceylon. His parents were born in Manipay in northern Ceylon and he had two sisters. His father Canagasabapathy was a public official who worked in several parts of the country. Vigneswaran's grandfather was a cousin of statesmen P. Ramanathan and P. Arunachalam.

Vigneswaran's father's work meant that the family moved often. Vigneswaran spent the first nine years of his life in Kurunegala and studied at Christchurch College. The family then moved to Anuradhapura where Vigneswaran attended Holy Family Convent. Vigneswaran joined Royal College, Colombo aged 11. After school Vigneswaran obtained B.A. degree from the University of London and LL.B. degree from the University of Ceylon. He then joined Ceylon Law College, qualifying as a proctor and an advocate. He was president of the Law Students’ Union at the college in 1962.

One of Vigneswaran's sons is married to the daughter of government minister Vasudeva Nanayakkara. His other son is married to the niece of former MP Keseralal Gunasekera.

Vigneswaran is also a follower of the controversial guru Swami Premananda whom he has compared to Jesus and has requested that Indian Prime Minister Narendra Modi release three jailed followers of Premananda.

== Career ==
=== Law ===
Vigneswaran practised of law for more than fifteen years. He is a President's Counsel. He joined the Judicial Service on 7 May 1979. He served as a magistrate and District Judge in Batticaloa, Chavakachcheri and Mallakam. He became District Judge for Colombo in January 1987. He was appointed to the High Court in 1988, serving in Northern Province, Eastern, North Central, Uva and Western provinces. He was appointed to the Court of Appeal in 1995.

Vigneswaran was appointed to the Supreme Court in March 2001. He retired in October 2004.

=== Politics ===
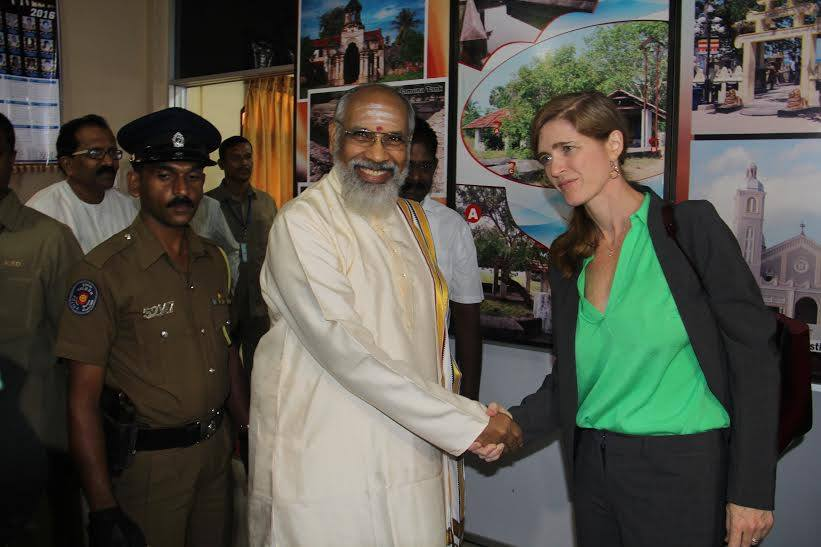
Vigneswaran meets U.S. Ambassador to the U.N. Samantha Power in November 2015

In April 2013 it was reported that Vigneswaran had been chosen by the Tamil National Alliance (TNA) to be its chief ministerial candidate in the upcoming election to Northern Provincial Council (NPC). The reports were denied by the TNA. However, in July 2013, after nominations were called for the provincial council election, the TNA announced that Vigneswaran would be its chief ministerial candidate in the Northern Province. He contested the provincial council election as one of the TNA's candidates in Jaffna District and was elected to the NPC. Vigneswaran received his chief ministerial appointment letter from Governor G. A. Chandrasiri on 1 October 2013. He took his oath as chief minister and provincial councillor in front of President Mahinda Rajapaksa at the Presidential Secretariat on 7 October 2013.

Vigneswaran's relationship with the TNA leadership deteriorated thereafter. In December 2015 he became leader of the newly formed Tamil People's Council (TPC), a forum to highlight issues affecting Sri Lankan Tamils. The TPC, which included civil society groups, religious leaders and academics as well as political parties, claimed that it wasn't political or an alternative to the TNA. On 24 October 2018, the day after he ceased being chief minister, Vigneswaran announced that he had formed a new political alliance, the Tamil People's Alliance (TPA, Thamizh Makkal Kootani).

In February 2020 the TPA joined with three other political parties to form the Tamil People's National Alliance (TPNA, Thamizh Makkal Tesiya Kootani) electoral alliance to contest the parliamentary election. Vigneswaran became the alliance's leader. He contested the 2020 parliamentary election as one of the TPNA's candidates in Jaffna District and was elected to the Parliament.

In 2024 he was found to have personally requested liquor licenses from President Ranil Wickremesinghe. Ranil had given Vigneswaran a license for a liquor shop in Killinochi. When questioned Vigneswaran denied the license was for his use but for a woman without parents.

== Electoral history ==
Electoral history of C. V. Vigneswaran
Election	Constituency	Party	Alliance	Votes	Result
2013 provincial	Jaffna District	Illankai Tamil Arasu Kachchi	Tamil National Alliance	132,255	Elected
2020 parliamentary	Jaffna District	Tamil People's Alliance	Tamil People's National Alliance	21,554	Elected
