= Northern Provincial Council =

Provincial council for Northern Province, Sri Lanka

Northern Provincial Council வட மாகாண சபை උතුරු පළාත් සභා
- 1st Northern Provincial Council

Type
- Type: Unicameral

Leadership
- Chairman: C. V. K. Sivagnanam, TNA since 25 October 2013
- Deputy Chairman: Anton Jeyanathan, TNA since 25 October 2013
- Chief Minister: C. V. Vigneswaran, TNA since 7 October 2013
- Leader of the Opposition: K. Kamalendran, UPFA since 25 October 2013
- Chief Secretary: R. Wijialudchumi since 5 December 2011

Structure
- Seats: 38
- Political groups: Government (30): TNA (30); Opposition (8): UPFA (7); SLMC (1)

Elections
- Last election: 21 September 2013

Meeting place
- Provincial Council Assembly Hall, Northern Provincial Council Building, Kaithady

Website
- np.gov.lk

Northern Provincial Council (Tamil: வட மாகாண சபை Vaṭa Mākāṇa Capai; NPC) is the provincial council for the Northern Province in Sri Lanka. In accordance with the Sri Lankan constitution, NPC has legislative power over a variety of matters including agriculture, education, health, housing, local government, planning, road transport and social services. The constitution also gives it powers over police and land but successive central governments have refused to devolve these powers to the provinces. NPC has 38 members elected using the open list proportional representation system.

== History ==
In an attempt to end the Sri Lankan Civil War the Indo-Lanka Accord was signed on 29 July 1987. One of the requirements of the accord was that the Sri Lankan government should devolve powers to the provinces. Accordingly, on 14 November 1987 the Sri Lankan Parliament passed the 13th Amendment to the Constitution of Sri Lanka and the Provincial Councils Act No 42 of 1987. On 3 February 1988 nine provincial councils were created by order. The first elections for provincial councils took place on 28 April 1988 in North Central, North Western, Sabaragamuwa, and Uva provinces. On 2 June 1988 elections were held for provincial councils for Central, Southern and Western provinces.

The Indo-Lanka Accord also required the merger of the Eastern and Northern provinces into one administrative unit. The accord required a referendum to be held by 31 December 1988 in the Eastern Province to decide whether the merger should be permanent. Crucially, the accord allowed the Sri Lankan president to postpone the referendum at his discretion. On September 2 and 8 1988 President Jayewardene issued proclamations enabling the Eastern and Northern provinces to be one administrative unit administered by one elected council, creating the North Eastern Province. Elections in the newly merged North Eastern Province were held on 19 November 1988. The Eelam People's Revolutionary Liberation Front, an Indian backed paramilitary group, won control of the North Eastern provincial council.

On 1 March 1990, just as the Indian Peace Keeping Force were preparing to withdraw from Sri Lanka, Annamalai Varatharajah Perumal, Chief Minister of the North Eastern Province, moved a motion in the North Eastern Provincial Council declaring an independent Eelam. President Premadasa reacted to Permual's UDI by dissolving the provincial council and imposing direct rule on the province.

The proclamations issued by President Jayewardene in September 1988 merging the Northern and Eastern provinces were only meant to be a temporary measure until a referendum was held in the Eastern Province on a permanent merger between the two provinces. However, the referendum was never held and successive Sri Lankan presidents issued proclamations annually extending the life of the "temporary" entity. The merger was bitterly opposed by Sri Lankan nationalists. The combined North Eastern Province occupied one third of Sri Lanka. The thought of the rebel Tamil Tigers controlling this province, directly or indirectly, alarmed them greatly. On 14 July 2006, after a long campaign against the merger, the Janatha Vimukthi Peramuna filed three separate petitions with the Supreme Court of Sri Lanka requesting a separate Provincial Council for the East. On 16 October 2006 the Supreme Court ruled that the proclamations issued by President Jayewardene were null and void and had no legal effect. The North Eastern Province was formally de-merged into the Eastern and Northern provinces on 1 January 2007. The Northern province was ruled directly from Colombo until 21 September 2013 when elections were held.

== Chairmen, deputy chairmen, chief ministers, leaders of the opposition and chief secretaries ==
Chairmen

- C. V. K. Sivagnanam, TNA-ITAK (2013-present)

Deputy Chairmen

- Anton Jeyanathan, TNA-ITAK (2013-present)

Chief Ministers

- C. V. Vigneswaran, TNA-ITAK (2013-present)

Leaders of the Opposition

- K. Kamalendran, UPFA-EPDP (2013-present)

Chief Secretaries

- S. Rangarajah, (2007-09)
- A. Sivaswamy, (2009-11)
- R. Wijialudchumi, (2011-present)

== Election results ==
=== 2013 provincial council election ===
Results of the 1st Northern Provincial Council election held on 21 September 2013
Alliances and parties	Jaffna			Kilinochchi			Mannar			Mullaitivu			Vavuniya			Bonus Seats	Total		
Alliances and parties	Votes	%	Seats	Votes	%	Seats	Votes	%	Seats	Votes	%	Seats	Votes	%	Seats	Bonus Seats	Votes	%	Seats
Tamil National Alliance	213,907	84.37%	14	37,079	81.57%	3	33,118	62.22%	3	28,266	78.56%	4	41,225	66.10%	4	2	353,595	78.48%	30
United People's Freedom Alliance	35,995	14.20%	2	7,897	17.37%	1	15,104	28.38%	1	7,209	20.04%	1	16,633	26.67%	2	0	82,838	18.38%	7
Sri Lanka Muslim Congress							4,571	8.59%	1	199	0.55%	0	1,991	3.19%	0	0	6,761	1.50%	1
United National Party	855	0.34%	0	54	0.12%	0	187	0.35%	0	197	0.55%	0	1,769	2.84%	0	0	3,062	0.68%	0
Independent lists	1,445	0.57%	0	29	0.06%	0	49	0.09%	0	54	0.15%	0	327	0.52%	0	0	1,904	0.42%	0
Democratic Unity Alliance	525	0.21%	0	61	0.13%	0	70	0.13%	0				170	0.27%	0	0	826	0.18%	0
Eelavar Democratic Front				300	0.66%	0										0	300	0.07%	0
Sri Lanka People's Party	292	0.12%	0													0	292	0.06%	0
Janatha Vimukthi Peramuna	56	0.02%	0	18	0.04%	0	11	0.02%	0	30	0.08%	0	173	0.28%	0	0	288	0.06%	0
United Socialist Party	165	0.07%	0										23	0.04%	0	0	188	0.04%	0
Democratic Party	111	0.04%	0	5	0.01%	0	11	0.02%	0	2	0.01%	0	41	0.07%	0	0	170	0.04%	0
Socialist Equality Party	101	0.04%	0													0	101	0.02%	0
Jana Setha Peramuna	74	0.03%	0	2	0.00%	0	7	0.01%	0	5	0.01%	0	2	0.00%	0	0	90	0.02%	0
Our National Front							87	0.16%	0							0	87	0.02%	0
Sri Lanka Labour Party	16	0.01%	0	4	0.01%	0	7	0.01%	0	2	0.01%	0	3	0.00%	0	0	32	0.01%	0
United Lanka Great Council				6	0.01%	0	1	0.00%	0	6	0.02%	0	2	0.00%	0	0	15	0.00%	0
Nationalities Unity Organisation				4	0.01%	0				10	0.03%	0				0	14	0.00%	0
United Lanka People's Party										2	0.01%	0	6	0.01%	0	0	8	0.00%	0
Muslim Liberation Front							3	0.01%	0							0	3	0.00%	0
Valid Votes	253,542	100.00%	16	45,459	100.00%	4	53,226	100.00%	5	35,982	100.00%	5	62,365	100.00%	6	2	450,574	100.00%	38
Rejected Votes	20,279			4,735			2,989			2,820			4,416				35,239		
Total Polled	273,821			50,194			56,215			38,802			66,781				485,813		
Registered Electors	426,813			68,600			75,737			53,683			94,644				719,477		
Turnout	64.15%			73.17%			74.22%			72.28%			70.56%				67.52%		
