= Member of Provincial Council =

In Sri Lanka a Member of Provincial Council (also known as Provincial Councilor), is the title given to an elected member of a provincial council. As of 2017, there are 455 members in nine provincial councils.

== Elections ==
All positions in a provincial council become simultaneously vacant for elections held on a five-year cycle. If a vacancy arises at another time, due to death or resignation, then an electoral district vacancy may be filled by the second highest scoring candidate in the last election from that electoral district.

== Title ==
Provincial council derives its traditions from the Parliament of Sri Lanka, therefore its members are often referred to as The Honourable (The Hon. or Hon.) Name MPC, during their term in office.

== Salaries and benefits ==
=== Salary and allowance ===
As per the Provincial Councils (Payment of Salaries and Allowances) Act, No. 37 of 1988, a member of a Provincial Council is entitled to a salary and allowances equal to half of monthly salary and all other allowance entitled to a Member of Parliament. A Member of the Board of Ministers of a Province, is entitled to a salary and allowances equal a salary of a Deputy Minister.

=== Office expenses ===
They are entitle to an annual free postal facility allowance of Rs 48,000 which was increased from Rs 24,000 in 2019.

=== Other benefits ===
Tax benefits

Members claim tax exemptions on their pay and allowance as it has been deemed an honorarium.

Duty free verticals

A member who has served for more than two and half years are entitled to import a high value luxury vehicle with without paying import duty that is normally charged under a duty free permit each term of office.

== See also ==
- Member of Parliament (Sri Lanka)
