= 2013 Sri Lankan provincial council elections =

6th Sri Lankan provincial council election
- 21 September 2013

148 seats across 3 provincial councils
- Turnout: 65.85%
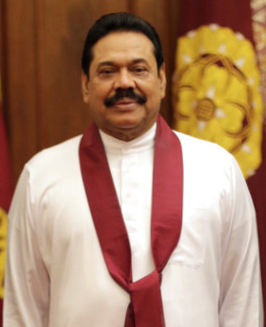

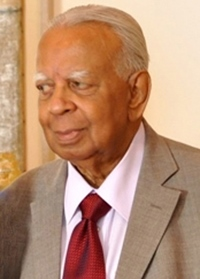

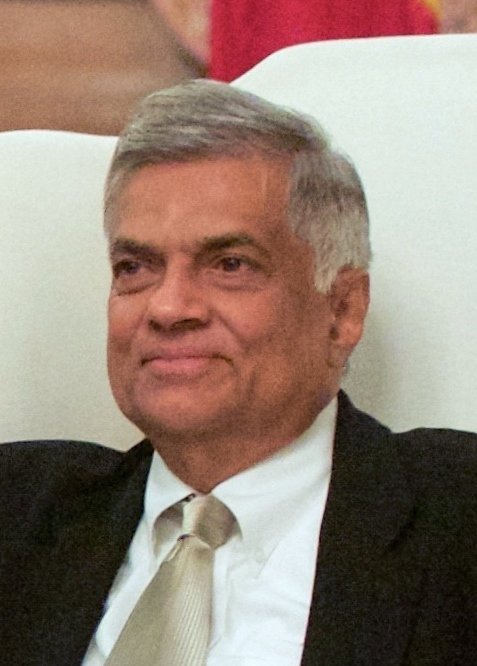
	First party	Second party	Third party
Leader	Mahinda Rajapaksa	R. Sampanthan	Ranil Wickremesinghe
Party	UPFA	TNA	UNP
Popular vote	1,504,273	353,595	590,888
Percentage	55.66%	13.08%	21.86%
Councillors	77	30	28
Councils	2	1	0
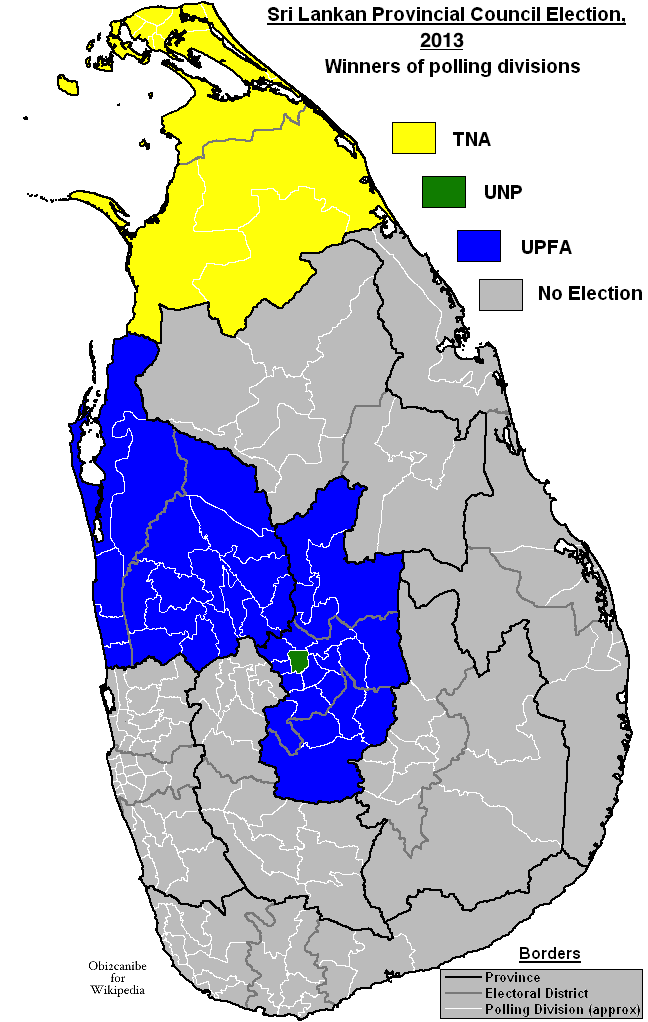
- Winners of polling divisions. UPFA in blue, TNA in yellow and UNP in green.

Provincial council elections were held in Sri Lanka on 21 September 2013 to elect 148 members to three of the nine provincial councils in the country. 4.4 million Sri Lankans were eligible to vote in the election. Elections to the remaining six provincial councils were not due as they had their last election in 2009 or 2012. This was the first provincial council election in the Northern Province in 25 years.

The United People's Freedom Alliance's domination of Sri Lankan elections continued as expected. It retained control of two provincial councils (Central and North Western) but the Tamil National Alliance won control of the first Northern Provincial Council.

== Background ==
In an attempt to end the Sri Lankan Civil War, the Indo-Lanka Accord was signed on 29 July 1987. One of the requirements of the accord was that the Sri Lankan government to devolve powers to the provinces. Accordingly, on 14 November 1987, the Sri Lankan Parliament passed the 13th Amendment to the Constitution of Sri Lanka and the Provincial Councils Act No 42 of 1987. On 3 February 1988, nine provincial councils were created by order. The first elections for provincial councils took place on 28 April 1988 in the North Central, North Western, Sabaragamuwa, and Uva provinces. On 2 June 1988 elections were held for provincial councils for Central, Southern and Western provinces. The United National Party (UNP), the ruling party at the time, won control of all seven provincial councils.

The Indo-Lanka Accord also required the merger of the Eastern and Northern provinces into one administrative unit. The accord required a referendum to be held by 31 December 1988 in the Eastern Province to decide whether the merger should be permanent. Crucially, the accord allowed the Sri Lankan president to postpone the referendum at his discretion. On 2 and 8 September 1988, President Jayewardene issued proclamations enabling the Eastern and Northern provinces to be one administrative unit administered by one elected council, creating the North Eastern Province. Elections in the newly merged North Eastern Province were held on 19 November 1988. The Eelam People's Revolutionary Liberation Front, an Indian-backed paramilitary group, won control of the North Eastern provincial council.

On 1 March 1990, just as the Indian Peace Keeping Force were preparing to withdraw from Sri Lanka, Annamalai Varadaraja Perumal, Chief Minister of the North Eastern Province, moved a motion in the North Eastern Provincial Council declaring an independent Tamil Eelam. President Premadasa reacted to Permual's UDI by dissolving the provincial council and imposing direct rule on the province.

The 2nd Sri Lankan provincial council election was held in 1993 in seven provinces. The UNP retained control of six provincial councils but lost control of the largest provincial council, Western, to the opposition People's Alliance. A special election was held in Southern Province in 1994 after some UNP provincial councillors defected to the opposition. The PA won the election and took control of the Southern Provincial Council.

The 3rd Sri Lankan provincial council election was held in 1999 in seven provinces. The PA, which was now in power nationally, managed to win the majority of seats in two provinces (North Central and North Western). It was also able to form a majority administration in the other five provinces with the support of smaller parties such as the Ceylon Workers' Congress (CWC) . The UNP regained control of the Central Provincial Council in 2002 after the CWC councillors crossed over to the opposition.

The 4th Sri Lankan provincial council election was held in 2004 in seven provinces. The United People's Freedom Alliance (UPFA), the successor to the PA, won all seven provinces.

On 14 July 2006, after a long campaign against the merger, the JVP filed three separate petitions with the Supreme Court of Sri Lanka requesting a separate Provincial Council for the East. On 16 October 2006 the Supreme Court ruled that the proclamations issued by President Jayewardene were null and void and had no legal effect. The North Eastern Province was formally demerged into the Northern and Eastern provinces on 1 January 2007.

The 5th Sri Lankan provincial council election was held on a staggered basis during 2008/09 in eight provinces including the newly demerged Eastern Province. The UPFA won all eight provinces.

Soon after the civil war ended in May 2009 there were calls for election to be held for the Northern Provincial Council. In January 2010 government minister Douglas Devananda stated that the election would be held soon after the 2010 presidential election. But the election wasn't held although presidential, parliamentary and local elections were held in the Northern Province. As the government procrastinated, international pressure mounted. In an interview with The Hindu in July 2012 President Rajapaksa stated the election would be held in September 2013. In March 2013 the United Nations Human Rights Council passed a resolution which, amongst other things, welcomed the decision to hold the election in September 2013.

The 6th Sri Lankan provincial council election was also held on a staggered basis. Elections were held on 8 September 2012 in Eastern, North Central and Sabaragamuwa provinces. The UPFA won the majority of seats in two provinces (North Central and Sabaragamuwa) and was also able to form a majority administration in Eastern Provinces with the support of the Sri Lanka Muslim Congress. On 5 July 2013 President Rajapaksa issued a proclamation ordering the Election Commissioner to conduct elections for the Northern Provincial Council. Central Provincial Council and North Western Provincial Council were also dissolved by their governors on 5 July 2013.

== Details ==
Nominations took place between 25 July 2013 and 1 August 2013. 210 nominations (131 form registered political parties, 79 from independent groups) were received by the returning officers of which 201 nominations (126 form registered political parties, 75 from independent groups) were accepted and nine nominations (five form registered political parties, four from independent groups) were rejected. The UPFA, UNP and Janatha Vimukthi Peramuna are contesting in all ten districts, the Tamil National Alliance is contesting in the five districts in Northern Province whilst the Sri Lanka Muslim Congress, a constituent party of the UPFA, is contesting separately in seven districts.

After the nomination period had ended Election Commissioner Mahinda Deshapriya announced that the elections would be held on 21 September 2013.

== Results ==
=== Overall ===
The UPFA won control of two provincial councils (Central and North Western) whilst the TNA won control of Northern Provincial Council.

Alliances and parties	Votes	%	Seats	Councils
United People's Freedom Alliance: All Ceylon Muslim Congress; Ceylon Workers' Congress; Communist Party of Sri Lanka; Democratic Left Front; Eelam People's Democratic Party; Jathika Hela Urumaya; Lanka Sama Samaja Party; Mahajana Eksath Peramuna; National Congress; National Freedom Front; Sri Lanka Freedom Party; Sri Lanka Muslim Congress	1,504,273	55.66%	77	2
Tamil National Alliance: Eelam People's Revolutionary Liberation Front; Illankai Tamil Arasu Kachchi; People's Liberation Organisation of Tamil Eelam; Tamil Eelam Liberation Organization; Tamil United Liberation Front	353,595	13.08%	30	1
United National Party	590,888	21.86%	28	0
Democratic Party	91,523	3.39%	5	0
Sri Lanka Muslim Congress	52,409	1.94%	4	0
Ceylon Workers' Congress	29,285	1.08%	2	0
Janatha Vimukthi Peramuna	33,799	1.25%	1	0
Up-Country People's Front	24,913	0.92%	1	0
Independent lists	7,450	0.28%	0	0
Jana Setha Peramuna	2,783	0.10%	0	0
Sri Lanka People's Party	1,842	0.07%	0	0
Our National Front	1,495	0.06%	0	0
Eelavar Democratic Front	1,396	0.05%	0	0
United Lanka Great Council	1,023	0.04%	0	0
Patriotic National Front	912	0.03%	0	0
Democratic Unity Alliance	826	0.03%	0	0
Nationalities Unity Organisation	762	0.03%	0	0
Socialist Alliance: Communist Party of Sri Lanka; Democratic Left Front; Lanka Sama Samaja Party	726	0.03%	0	0
United Socialist Party	711	0.03%	0	0
United Lanka People's Party	554	0.02%	0	0
New Democratic Front	504	0.02%	0	0
Ruhuna People's Party	300	0.01%	0	0
Sri Lanka Labour Party	253	0.01%	0	0
New Sinhala Heritage	154	0.01%	0	0
Socialist Equality Party	101	0.00%	0	0
Muslim Liberation Front	92	0.00%	0	0
Valid Votes	2,702,569	100.00%	148	3
Rejected Votes	170,615			
Total Polled	2,873,184			
Registered Electors	4,363,252			
Turnout	65.85%			

=== Central Province ===
Results of the 6th Central Provincial Council election held on 21 September 2013:

Alliances and parties	Kandy			Matale			Nuwara Eliya			Bonus Seats	Total		
Alliances and parties	Votes	%	Seats	Votes	%	Seats	Votes	%	Seats	Bonus Seats	Votes	%	Seats
United People's Freedom Alliance	355,812	55.76%	16	135,128	59.99%	7	225,307	68.87%	11	2	716,247	60.16%	36
United National Party	200,187	31.37%	9	63,365	28.13%	3	67,263	20.56%	4	0	330,815	27.79%	16
Democratic Party	37,431	5.87%	2	4,423	1.96%	0	3,385	1.03%	0	0	45,239	3.80%	2
Ceylon Workers' Congress	18,787	2.94%	1	10,498	4.66%	1				0	29,285	2.46%	2
Up-Country People's Front	1,458	0.23%	0				23,455	7.17%	1	0	24,913	2.09%	1
Sri Lanka Muslim Congress	11,137	1.75%	1	6,651	2.95%	0				0	17,788	1.49%	1
Janatha Vimukthi Peramuna	7,640	1.20%	0	3,937	1.75%	0	2,310	0.71%	0	0	13,887	1.17%	0
Independent lists	996	0.16%	0	578	0.26%	0	2,674	0.82%	0	0	4,248	0.36%	0
Sri Lanka People's Party	1,550	0.24%	0							0	1,550	0.13%	0
Eelavar Democratic Front							1,096	0.34%	0	0	1,096	0.09%	0
Jana Setha Peramuna	756	0.12%	0	161	0.07%	0	37	0.01%	0	0	954	0.08%	0
Socialist Alliance							726	0.22%	0	0	726	0.06%	0
Our National Front	466	0.07%	0	199	0.09%	0				0	665	0.06%	0
United Lanka Great Council	544	0.09%	0	49	0.02%	0	63	0.02%	0	0	656	0.06%	0
Patriotic National Front	342	0.05%	0	66	0.03%	0	129	0.04%	0	0	537	0.05%	0
United Socialist Party							523	0.16%	0	0	523	0.04%	0
New Democratic Front	504	0.08%	0							0	504	0.04%	0
United Lanka People's Party				117	0.05%	0	138	0.04%	0	0	255	0.02%	0
Ruhuna People's Party	167	0.03%	0	47	0.02%	0	16	0.00%	0	0	230	0.02%	0
New Sinhala Heritage	154	0.02%	0							0	154	0.01%	0
Sri Lanka Labour Party	77	0.01%	0	49	0.02%	0	21	0.01%	0	0	147	0.01%	0
Muslim Liberation Front	89	0.01%	0							0	89	0.01%	0
Valid Votes	638,097	100.00%	29	225,268	100.00%	11	327,143	100.00%	16	2	1,190,508	100.00%	58
Rejected Votes	39,148			15,336			27,677				82,161		
Total Polled	677,245			240,604			354,820				1,272,669		
Registered Electors	1,015,315			366,549			507,693				1,889,557		
Turnout	66.70%			65.64%			69.89%				67.35%		

=== Northern Province ===
Results of the 1st Northern Provincial Council election held on 21 September 2013:

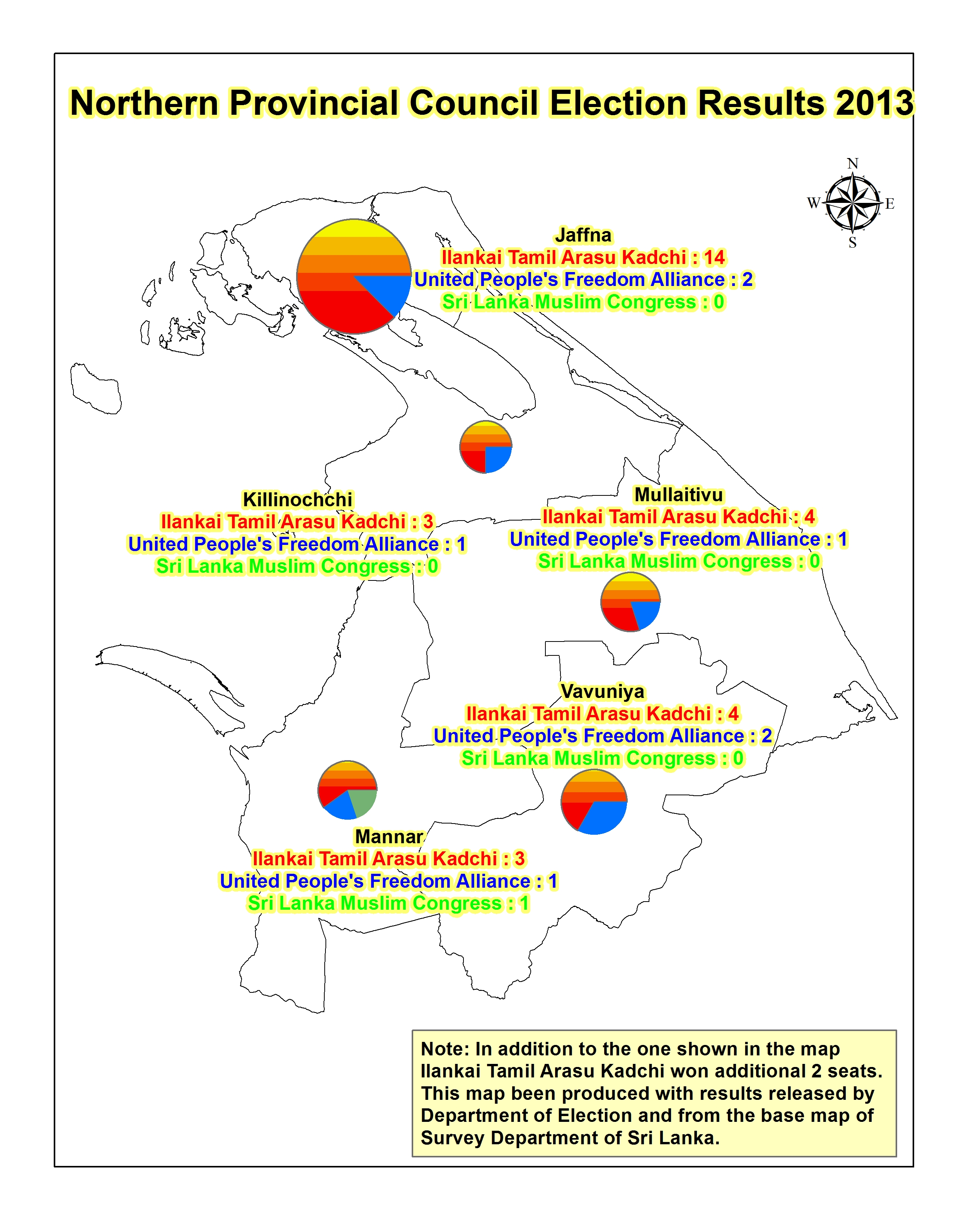
Northern Provincial Election Results 2013

Alliances and parties	Jaffna			Kilinochchi			Mannar			Mullaitivu			Vavuniya			Bonus Seats	Total		
Alliances and parties	Votes	%	Seats	Votes	%	Seats	Votes	%	Seats	Votes	%	Seats	Votes	%	Seats	Bonus Seats	Votes	%	Seats
Tamil National Alliance	213,907	84.37%	14	37,079	81.57%	3	33,118	62.22%	3	28,266	78.56%	4	41,225	66.10%	4	2	353,595	78.48%	30
United People's Freedom Alliance	35,995	14.20%	2	7,897	17.37%	1	15,104	28.38%	1	7,209	20.04%	1	16,633	26.67%	2	0	82,838	18.38%	7
Sri Lanka Muslim Congress							4,571	8.59%	1	199	0.55%	0	1,991	3.19%	0	0	6,761	1.50%	1
United National Party	855	0.34%	0	54	0.12%	0	187	0.35%	0	197	0.55%	0	1,769	2.84%	0	0	3,062	0.68%	0
Independent lists	1,445	0.57%	0	29	0.06%	0	49	0.09%	0	54	0.15%	0	327	0.52%	0	0	1,904	0.42%	0
Democratic Unity Alliance	525	0.21%	0	61	0.13%	0	70	0.13%	0				170	0.27%	0	0	826	0.18%	0
Eelavar Democratic Front				300	0.66%	0										0	300	0.07%	0
Sri Lanka People's Party	292	0.12%	0													0	292	0.06%	0
Janatha Vimukthi Peramuna	56	0.02%	0	18	0.04%	0	11	0.02%	0	30	0.08%	0	173	0.28%	0	0	288	0.06%	0
United Socialist Party	165	0.07%	0										23	0.04%	0	0	188	0.04%	0
Democratic Party	111	0.04%	0	5	0.01%	0	11	0.02%	0	2	0.01%	0	41	0.07%	0	0	170	0.04%	0
Socialist Equality Party	101	0.04%	0													0	101	0.02%	0
Jana Setha Peramuna	74	0.03%	0	2	0.00%	0	7	0.01%	0	5	0.01%	0	2	0.00%	0	0	90	0.02%	0
Our National Front							87	0.16%	0							0	87	0.02%	0
Sri Lanka Labour Party	16	0.01%	0	4	0.01%	0	7	0.01%	0	2	0.01%	0	3	0.00%	0	0	32	0.01%	0
United Lanka Great Council				6	0.01%	0	1	0.00%	0	6	0.02%	0	2	0.00%	0	0	15	0.00%	0
Nationalities Unity Organisation				4	0.01%	0				10	0.03%	0				0	14	0.00%	0
United Lanka People's Party										2	0.01%	0	6	0.01%	0	0	8	0.00%	0
Muslim Liberation Front							3	0.01%	0							0	3	0.00%	0
Valid Votes	253,542	100.00%	16	45,459	100.00%	4	53,226	100.00%	5	35,982	100.00%	5	62,365	100.00%	6	2	450,574	100.00%	38
Rejected Votes	20,279			4,735			2,989			2,820			4,416				35,239		
Total Polled	273,821			50,194			56,215			38,802			66,781				485,813		
Registered Electors	426,813			68,600			75,737			53,683			94,644				719,477		
Turnout	64.15%			73.17%			74.22%			72.28%			70.56%				67.52%		

=== North Western Province ===
Results of the 6th North Western Provincial Council election held on 21 September 2013:

Alliances and parties	Kurunegala			Puttalam			Bonus Seats	Total		
Alliances and parties	Votes	%	Seats	Votes	%	Seats	Bonus Seats	Votes	%	Seats
United People's Freedom Alliance	540,513	69.05%	23	164,675	59.10%	9	2	705,188	66.43%	34
United National Party	169,668	21.67%	7	87,343	31.34%	5	0	257,011	24.21%	12
Democratic Party	36,096	4.61%	2	10,018	3.60%	1	0	46,114	4.34%	3
Sri Lanka Muslim Congress	17,130	2.19%	1	10,730	3.85%	1	0	27,860	2.62%	2
Janatha Vimukthi Peramuna	16,311	2.08%	1	3,313	1.19%	0	0	19,624	1.85%	1
Jana Setha Peramuna	627	0.08%	0	1,112	0.40%	0	0	1,739	0.16%	0
Independent lists	850	0.11%	0	448	0.16%	0	0	1,298	0.12%	0
Nationalities Unity Organisation	232	0.03%	0	516	0.19%	0	0	748	0.07%	0
Our National Front	541	0.07%	0	202	0.07%	0	0	743	0.07%	0
Patriotic National Front	277	0.04%	0	98	0.04%	0	0	375	0.04%	0
United Lanka Great Council	192	0.02%	0	160	0.06%	0	0	352	0.03%	0
United Lanka People's Party	291	0.04%	0				0	291	0.03%	0
Sri Lanka Labour Party	51	0.01%	0	23	0.01%	0	0	74	0.01%	0
Ruhuna People's Party	53	0.01%	0	17	0.01%	0	0	70	0.01%	0
Valid Votes	782,832	100.00%	34	278,655	100.00%	16	2	1,061,487	100.00%	52
Rejected Votes	36,562			16,653				53,215		
Total Polled	819,394			295,308				1,114,702		
Registered Electors	1,227,810			526,408				1,754,218		
Turnout	66.74%			56.10%				63.54%		
