= Valikamam =

Valikamam வலிகாமம் වලිකාමම්
- Region
- Location within Sri Lanka
- Coordinates: 09°45′N 80°01′E
- Country: Sri Lanka
- Province: Northern
- District: Jaffna
- Largest city: Jaffna
- Divisional Secretariats: List: Jaffna; Nallur; Valikamam East; Valikamam North; Valikamam South; Valikamam South West; Valikamam West

Area
  - Total: 344.2 km^{2} (132.9 sq mi)

Population (2007)
  - Total: 358,991
  - Density: 1,043/km^{2} (2,701/sq mi)
- Time zone: UTC+05:30 (Sri Lanka)

Valikamam (Tamil: வலிகாமம், romanized: Valikāmam; Sinhala: වැලිගම, romanized: Væligama) is one of the three historic regions of Jaffna Peninsula in northern Sri Lanka. The other two regions are Thenmarachchi and Vadamarachchi. Alternative spellings include Valikaamam or Valigamam.

== Etymology ==
The name Valikamam (Tamil: வலிகாமம், romanized: Valikāmam) translates to "the sandy village", whereas Tamil: மேற்கு, romanized: Mēṟku, lit. 'West' denotes the geographical marker.

It is derived from the words:

- Tamil: வலி, romanized: Vali, lit. 'Sand or sandy land'
- Tamil: காமம், romanized: Kāmam, lit. 'Village'

The word காமம், Kāmam is no longer in common use but was historically found in Eezham Tamil place names. It shares linguistic roots with Sanskrit: ग्राम, romanized: Grāma, Pali: गाम, romanized: Gāma, and Sinhala: ගම, romanized: Gama. The word has been found in early Tamil inscriptions, including an 11th-century record at Velgam Vihara, Trincomalee, and a 12th-century Chola inscription at Thiruvalangadu, where Valikamam is explicitly mentioned as a village.

The name Valikamam is also linguistically equivalent to Manaltidar or Manarridal, the ancient Tamil names for Jaffna, which carry the same meaning of "sandy land."

According to the 16th-century Tamil literary work Santiago Kumara Ammanai, Valikamam was historically referred to as well as: வல்லி கிராமம், romanized: Valli Kiraamam, lit. 'The village of the Tinospora cordifolia plant.'

The village Mallakam (Tamil: மல்லாகம், romanized: Mallākam), located in Valikamam North, derives its name from: - மல்ல, Malla – a personal title associated with royalty or warriors, originating from the Sanskrit Sanskrit: मल्ल, romanized: Malla, meaning wrestler or great person. This term was commonly used by Pallava rulers and medieval Sri Lankan kings, such as Nissanka Malla (12th century).

== Geography ==
=== Administrative Divisions ===
Valikamam is currently divided into 6 Divisional Secretariats, each of which is further subdivided into 190 Grama Niladhari (GN) divisions. Every Divisional Secretariat has its own Divisional Council, which is elected every four years through local government elections.

Administrative Divisions
Divisional Secretariat	Tamil name	Sinhala name	Divisional Council	Grama Niladhari Division	Division No
Jaffna	Tamil: யாழ்ப்பாணம், romanized: Yāḻppāṇam	Sinhala: යාපනය, romanized: Yāpanaya	Jaffna Divisional Council	Nedunkulam	J/61
Jaffna	Tamil: யாழ்ப்பாணம், romanized: Yāḻppāṇam	Sinhala: යාපනය, romanized: Yāpanaya	Jaffna Divisional Council	Columputhurai East	J/62
Jaffna	Tamil: யாழ்ப்பாணம், romanized: Yāḻppāṇam	Sinhala: යාපනය, romanized: Yāpanaya	Jaffna Divisional Council	Columputhurai West	J/63
Jaffna	Tamil: யாழ்ப்பாணம், romanized: Yāḻppāṇam	Sinhala: යාපනය, romanized: Yāpanaya	Jaffna Divisional Council	Passaiyoor East	J/64
Jaffna	Tamil: யாழ்ப்பாணம், romanized: Yāḻppāṇam	Sinhala: යාපනය, romanized: Yāpanaya	Jaffna Divisional Council	Passaiyoor West	J/65
Jaffna	Tamil: யாழ்ப்பாணம், romanized: Yāḻppāṇam	Sinhala: යාපනය, romanized: Yāpanaya	Jaffna Divisional Council	Echchamoddai	J/66
Jaffna	Tamil: யாழ்ப்பாணம், romanized: Yāḻppāṇam	Sinhala: යාපනය, romanized: Yāpanaya	Jaffna Divisional Council	Thirunagar	J/67
Jaffna	Tamil: யாழ்ப்பாணம், romanized: Yāḻppāṇam	Sinhala: යාපනය, romanized: Yāpanaya	Jaffna Divisional Council	Reclamation East	J/68
Jaffna	Tamil: யாழ்ப்பாணம், romanized: Yāḻppāṇam	Sinhala: යාපනය, romanized: Yāpanaya	Jaffna Divisional Council	Reclamation West	J/69
Jaffna	Tamil: யாழ்ப்பாணம், romanized: Yāḻppāṇam	Sinhala: යාපනය, romanized: Yāpanaya	Jaffna Divisional Council	Gurunagar East	J/70
Jaffna	Tamil: யாழ்ப்பாணம், romanized: Yāḻppāṇam	Sinhala: යාපනය, romanized: Yāpanaya	Jaffna Divisional Council	Gurunagar West	J/71
Jaffna	Tamil: யாழ்ப்பாணம், romanized: Yāḻppāṇam	Sinhala: යාපනය, romanized: Yāpanaya	Jaffna Divisional Council	Small Bazar	J/72
Jaffna	Tamil: யாழ்ப்பாணம், romanized: Yāḻppāṇam	Sinhala: යාපනය, romanized: Yāpanaya	Jaffna Divisional Council	Jaffna Town West	J/73
Jaffna	Tamil: யாழ்ப்பாணம், romanized: Yāḻppāṇam	Sinhala: යාපනය, romanized: Yāpanaya	Jaffna Divisional Council	Jaffna Town East	J/74
Jaffna	Tamil: யாழ்ப்பாணம், romanized: Yāḻppāṇam	Sinhala: යාපනය, romanized: Yāpanaya	Jaffna Divisional Council	Chundikuli South	J/75
Jaffna	Tamil: யாழ்ப்பாணம், romanized: Yāḻppāṇam	Sinhala: යාපනය, romanized: Yāpanaya	Jaffna Divisional Council	Chundikuli North	J/76
Jaffna	Tamil: யாழ்ப்பாணம், romanized: Yāḻppāṇam	Sinhala: යාපනය, romanized: Yāpanaya	Jaffna Divisional Council	Maruthady	J/77
Jaffna	Tamil: யாழ்ப்பாணம், romanized: Yāḻppāṇam	Sinhala: යාපනය, romanized: Yāpanaya	Jaffna Divisional Council	Athiady	J/78
Jaffna	Tamil: யாழ்ப்பாணம், romanized: Yāḻppāṇam	Sinhala: යාපනය, romanized: Yāpanaya	Jaffna Divisional Council	Sirampiyadi	J/79
Jaffna	Tamil: யாழ்ப்பாணம், romanized: Yāḻppāṇam	Sinhala: යාපනය, romanized: Yāpanaya	Jaffna Divisional Council	Grand Bazar	J/80
Jaffna	Tamil: யாழ்ப்பாணம், romanized: Yāḻppāṇam	Sinhala: යාපනය, romanized: Yāpanaya	Jaffna Divisional Council	Fort	J/81
Jaffna	Tamil: யாழ்ப்பாணம், romanized: Yāḻppāṇam	Sinhala: යාපනය, romanized: Yāpanaya	Jaffna Divisional Council	Vannarpannai	J/82
Jaffna	Tamil: யாழ்ப்பாணம், romanized: Yāḻppāṇam	Sinhala: යාපනය, romanized: Yāpanaya	Jaffna Divisional Council	Koddady	J/83
Jaffna	Tamil: யாழ்ப்பாணம், romanized: Yāḻppāṇam	Sinhala: යාපනය, romanized: Yāpanaya	Jaffna Divisional Council	Navanthurai South	J/84
Jaffna	Tamil: யாழ்ப்பாணம், romanized: Yāḻppāṇam	Sinhala: යාපනය, romanized: Yāpanaya	Jaffna Divisional Council	Navanthurai North	J/85
Jaffna	Tamil: யாழ்ப்பாணம், romanized: Yāḻppāṇam	Sinhala: යාපනය, romanized: Yāpanaya	Jaffna Divisional Council	Moor Street South	J/86
Jaffna	Tamil: யாழ்ப்பாணம், romanized: Yāḻppāṇam	Sinhala: යාපනය, romanized: Yāpanaya	Jaffna Divisional Council	Moor Street North	J/87
Jaffna	Tamil: யாழ்ப்பாணம், romanized: Yāḻppāṇam	Sinhala: යාපනය, romanized: Yāpanaya	Jaffna Divisional Council	New Moor Street	J/88
Nallur	Tamil: நல்லூர், romanized: Nallūr	Sinhala: නල්ලුර්, romanized: Nallur	Nallur Divisional Council	Ariyalai South East	J/89
Nallur	Tamil: நல்லூர், romanized: Nallūr	Sinhala: නල්ලුර්, romanized: Nallur	Nallur Divisional Council	Ariyalai East	J/90
Nallur	Tamil: நல்லூர், romanized: Nallūr	Sinhala: නල්ලුර්, romanized: Nallur	Nallur Divisional Council	Ariyalai North West	J/91
Nallur	Tamil: நல்லூர், romanized: Nallūr	Sinhala: නල්ලුර්, romanized: Nallur	Nallur Divisional Council	Ariyalai Centre West	J/92
Nallur	Tamil: நல்லூர், romanized: Nallūr	Sinhala: නල්ලුර්, romanized: Nallur	Nallur Divisional Council	Ariyalai South West	J/93
Nallur	Tamil: நல்லூர், romanized: Nallūr	Sinhala: නල්ලුර්, romanized: Nallur	Nallur Divisional Council	Ariyalai Centre North	J/94
Nallur	Tamil: நல்லூர், romanized: Nallūr	Sinhala: නල්ලුර්, romanized: Nallur	Nallur Divisional Council	Ariyalai Centre	J/95
Nallur	Tamil: நல்லூர், romanized: Nallūr	Sinhala: නල්ලුර්, romanized: Nallur	Nallur Divisional Council	Ariyalai Centre South	J/96
Nallur	Tamil: நல்லூர், romanized: Nallūr	Sinhala: නල්ලුර්, romanized: Nallur	Nallur Divisional Council	Iyanar Kovilady	J/97
Nallur	Tamil: நல்லூர், romanized: Nallūr	Sinhala: නල්ලුර්, romanized: Nallur	Nallur Divisional Council	Vannarpannai North	J/98
Nallur	Tamil: நல்லூர், romanized: Nallūr	Sinhala: නල්ලුර්, romanized: Nallur	Nallur Divisional Council	Vannarpannai North West	J/99
Nallur	Tamil: நல்லூர், romanized: Nallūr	Sinhala: නල්ලුර්, romanized: Nallur	Nallur Divisional Council	Vannarpannai North East	J/100
Nallur	Tamil: நல்லூர், romanized: Nallūr	Sinhala: නල්ලුර්, romanized: Nallur	Nallur Divisional Council	Neeraviyady	J/101
Nallur	Tamil: நல்லூர், romanized: Nallūr	Sinhala: නල්ලුර්, romanized: Nallur	Nallur Divisional Council	Kandarmadam North West	J/102
Nallur	Tamil: நல்லூர், romanized: Nallūr	Sinhala: නල්ලුර්, romanized: Nallur	Nallur Divisional Council	Kandarmadam North East	J/103
Nallur	Tamil: நல்லூர், romanized: Nallūr	Sinhala: නල්ලුර්, romanized: Nallur	Nallur Divisional Council	Kandarmadam South West	J/104
Nallur	Tamil: நல்லூர், romanized: Nallūr	Sinhala: නල්ලුර්, romanized: Nallur	Nallur Divisional Council	Kandarmadam South East	J/105
Nallur	Tamil: நல்லூர், romanized: Nallūr	Sinhala: නල්ලුර්, romanized: Nallur	Nallur Divisional Council	Nallur North	J/106
Nallur	Tamil: நல்லூர், romanized: Nallūr	Sinhala: නල්ලුර්, romanized: Nallur	Nallur Divisional Council	Nallur Rajathani	J/107
Nallur	Tamil: நல்லூர், romanized: Nallūr	Sinhala: නල්ලුර්, romanized: Nallur	Nallur Divisional Council	Nallur South	J/108
Nallur	Tamil: நல்லூர், romanized: Nallūr	Sinhala: නල්ලුර්, romanized: Nallur	Nallur Divisional Council	Sankiliyan Thoppu	J/109
Nallur	Tamil: நல்லூர், romanized: Nallūr	Sinhala: නල්ලුර්, romanized: Nallur	Nallur Divisional Council	Thirunelvely West	J/110
Nallur	Tamil: நல்லூர், romanized: Nallūr	Sinhala: නල්ලුර්, romanized: Nallur	Nallur Divisional Council	Thirunelvely Centre South	J/111
Nallur	Tamil: நல்லூர், romanized: Nallūr	Sinhala: නල්ලුර්, romanized: Nallur	Nallur Divisional Council	Thirunelvely South East	J/112
Nallur	Tamil: நல்லூர், romanized: Nallūr	Sinhala: නල්ලුර්, romanized: Nallur	Nallur Divisional Council	Thirunelvely North East	J/113
Nallur	Tamil: நல்லூர், romanized: Nallūr	Sinhala: නල්ලුර්, romanized: Nallur	Nallur Divisional Council	Thirunelvely Centre North	J/114
Nallur	Tamil: நல்லூர், romanized: Nallūr	Sinhala: නල්ලුර්, romanized: Nallur	Nallur Divisional Council	Kondavil North West	J/115
Nallur	Tamil: நல்லூர், romanized: Nallūr	Sinhala: නල්ලුර්, romanized: Nallur	Nallur Divisional Council	Kondavil South West	J/116
Nallur	Tamil: நல்லூர், romanized: Nallūr	Sinhala: නල්ලුර්, romanized: Nallur	Nallur Divisional Council	Kondavil Centre West	J/117
Nallur	Tamil: நல்லூர், romanized: Nallūr	Sinhala: නල්ලුර්, romanized: Nallur	Nallur Divisional Council	Kondavil Centre East	J/118
Nallur	Tamil: நல்லூர், romanized: Nallūr	Sinhala: නල්ලුර්, romanized: Nallur	Nallur Divisional Council	Kondavil North East	J/119
Nallur	Tamil: நல்லூர், romanized: Nallūr	Sinhala: නල්ලුර්, romanized: Nallur	Nallur Divisional Council	Kondavil South East	J/120
Nallur	Tamil: நல்லூர், romanized: Nallūr	Sinhala: නල්ලුර්, romanized: Nallur	Nallur Divisional Council	Kokuvil North East	J/121
Nallur	Tamil: நல்லூர், romanized: Nallūr	Sinhala: නල්ලුර්, romanized: Nallur	Nallur Divisional Council	Kokuvil East	J/122
Nallur	Tamil: நல்லூர், romanized: Nallūr	Sinhala: නල්ලුර්, romanized: Nallur	Nallur Divisional Council	Kokuvil South East	J/123
Nallur	Tamil: நல்லூர், romanized: Nallūr	Sinhala: නල්ලුර්, romanized: Nallur	Nallur Divisional Council	Kokuvil North West	J/124
Nallur	Tamil: நல்லூர், romanized: Nallūr	Sinhala: නල්ලුර්, romanized: Nallur	Nallur Divisional Council	Kokuvil West	J/125
Nallur	Tamil: நல்லூர், romanized: Nallūr	Sinhala: නල්ලුර්, romanized: Nallur	Nallur Divisional Council	Kokuvil Centre East	J/126
Nallur	Tamil: நல்லூர், romanized: Nallūr	Sinhala: නල්ලුර්, romanized: Nallur	Nallur Divisional Council	Kokuvil South West	J/127
Nallur	Tamil: நல்லூர், romanized: Nallūr	Sinhala: නල්ලුර්, romanized: Nallur	Nallur Divisional Council	Kokuvil Centre West	J/128
Valikamam East	Tamil: வலிகாமம் கிழக்கு, romanized: Valikāmam Kiḻakku	Sinhala: වලිගම නැගෙනහිර, romanized: Valigama Neganahira	Valikamam East Divisional Council	Irupalai South	J/257
Valikamam East	Tamil: வலிகாமம் கிழக்கு, romanized: Valikāmam Kiḻakku	Sinhala: වලිගම නැගෙනහිර, romanized: Valigama Neganahira	Valikamam East Divisional Council	Irupalai East	J/258
Valikamam East	Tamil: வலிகாமம் கிழக்கு, romanized: Valikāmam Kiḻakku	Sinhala: වලිගම නැගෙනහිර, romanized: Valigama Neganahira	Valikamam East Divisional Council	Kalviyankadu	J/259
Valikamam East	Tamil: வலிகாமம் கிழக்கு, romanized: Valikāmam Kiḻakku	Sinhala: වලිගම නැගෙනහිර, romanized: Valigama Neganahira	Valikamam East Divisional Council	Kopay South	J/260
Valikamam East	Tamil: வலிகாமம் கிழக்கு, romanized: Valikāmam Kiḻakku	Sinhala: වලිගම නැගෙනහිර, romanized: Valigama Neganahira	Valikamam East Divisional Council	Kopay Centre	J/261
Valikamam East	Tamil: வலிகாமம் கிழக்கு, romanized: Valikāmam Kiḻakku	Sinhala: වලිගම නැගෙනහිර, romanized: Valigama Neganahira	Valikamam East Divisional Council	Kopay North	J/262
Valikamam East	Tamil: வலிகாமம் கிழக்கு, romanized: Valikāmam Kiḻakku	Sinhala: වලිගම නැගෙනහිර, romanized: Valigama Neganahira	Valikamam East Divisional Council	Urumpirai West	J/263
Valikamam East	Tamil: வலிகாமம் கிழக்கு, romanized: Valikāmam Kiḻakku	Sinhala: වලිගම නැගෙනහිර, romanized: Valigama Neganahira	Valikamam East Divisional Council	Urumpirai North	J/264
Valikamam East	Tamil: வலிகாமம் கிழக்கு, romanized: Valikāmam Kiḻakku	Sinhala: වලිගම නැගෙනහිර, romanized: Valigama Neganahira	Valikamam East Divisional Council	Urumpirai South	J/265
Valikamam East	Tamil: வலிகாமம் கிழக்கு, romanized: Valikāmam Kiḻakku	Sinhala: වලිගම නැගෙනහිර, romanized: Valigama Neganahira	Valikamam East Divisional Council	Urumpirai East	J/266
Valikamam East	Tamil: வலிகாமம் கிழக்கு, romanized: Valikāmam Kiḻakku	Sinhala: වලිගම නැගෙනහිර, romanized: Valigama Neganahira	Valikamam East Divisional Council	Urelu	J/267
Valikamam East	Tamil: வலிகாமம் கிழக்கு, romanized: Valikāmam Kiḻakku	Sinhala: වලිගම නැගෙනහිර, romanized: Valigama Neganahira	Valikamam East Divisional Council	Neervely South	J/268
Valikamam East	Tamil: வலிகாமம் கிழக்கு, romanized: Valikāmam Kiḻakku	Sinhala: වලිගම නැගෙනහිර, romanized: Valigama Neganahira	Valikamam East Divisional Council	Neervely North	J/269
Valikamam East	Tamil: வலிகாமம் கிழக்கு, romanized: Valikāmam Kiḻakku	Sinhala: වලිගම නැගෙනහිර, romanized: Valigama Neganahira	Valikamam East Divisional Council	Neervely West	J/270
Valikamam East	Tamil: வலிகாமம் கிழக்கு, romanized: Valikāmam Kiḻakku	Sinhala: වලිගම නැගෙනහිර, romanized: Valigama Neganahira	Valikamam East Divisional Council	Sirippiddy East	J/271
Valikamam East	Tamil: வலிகாமம் கிழக்கு, romanized: Valikāmam Kiḻakku	Sinhala: වලිගම නැගෙනහිර, romanized: Valigama Neganahira	Valikamam East Divisional Council	Sirippiddy West	J/272
Valikamam East	Tamil: வலிகாமம் கிழக்கு, romanized: Valikāmam Kiḻakku	Sinhala: වලිගම නැගෙනහිර, romanized: Valigama Neganahira	Valikamam East Divisional Council	Puttur West	J/273
Valikamam East	Tamil: வலிகாமம் கிழக்கு, romanized: Valikāmam Kiḻakku	Sinhala: වලිගම නැගෙනහිර, romanized: Valigama Neganahira	Valikamam East Divisional Council	Puttur North	J/274
Valikamam East	Tamil: வலிகாமம் கிழக்கு, romanized: Valikāmam Kiḻakku	Sinhala: වලිගම නැගෙනහිර, romanized: Valigama Neganahira	Valikamam East Divisional Council	Navatkiri	J/275
Valikamam East	Tamil: வலிகாமம் கிழக்கு, romanized: Valikāmam Kiḻakku	Sinhala: වලිගම නැගෙනහිර, romanized: Valigama Neganahira	Valikamam East Divisional Council	Avarangal East	J/276
Valikamam East	Tamil: வலிகாமம் கிழக்கு, romanized: Valikāmam Kiḻakku	Sinhala: වලිගම නැගෙනහිර, romanized: Valigama Neganahira	Valikamam East Divisional Council	Avarangal West	J/277
Valikamam East	Tamil: வலிகாமம் கிழக்கு, romanized: Valikāmam Kiḻakku	Sinhala: වලිගම නැගෙනහිර, romanized: Valigama Neganahira	Valikamam East Divisional Council	Puttur East	J/278
Valikamam East	Tamil: வலிகாமம் கிழக்கு, romanized: Valikāmam Kiḻakku	Sinhala: වලිගම නැගෙනහිර, romanized: Valigama Neganahira	Valikamam East Divisional Council	Achelu	J/279
Valikamam East	Tamil: வலிகாமம் கிழக்கு, romanized: Valikāmam Kiḻakku	Sinhala: වලිගම නැගෙනහිර, romanized: Valigama Neganahira	Valikamam East Divisional Council	Vatharavathai	J/280
Valikamam East	Tamil: வலிகாமம் கிழக்கு, romanized: Valikāmam Kiḻakku	Sinhala: වලිගම නැගෙනහිර, romanized: Valigama Neganahira	Valikamam East Divisional Council	Pathameny	J/281
Valikamam East	Tamil: வலிகாமம் கிழக்கு, romanized: Valikāmam Kiḻakku	Sinhala: වලිගම නැගෙනහිර, romanized: Valigama Neganahira	Valikamam East Divisional Council	Thampalai / Kathiripay	J/282
Valikamam East	Tamil: வலிகாமம் கிழக்கு, romanized: Valikāmam Kiḻakku	Sinhala: වලිගම නැගෙනහිර, romanized: Valigama Neganahira	Valikamam East Divisional Council	Idaikkadu	J/283
Valikamam East	Tamil: வலிகாமம் கிழக்கு, romanized: Valikāmam Kiḻakku	Sinhala: වලිගම නැගෙනහිර, romanized: Valigama Neganahira	Valikamam East Divisional Council	Valalai	J/284
Valikamam East	Tamil: வலிகாமம் கிழக்கு, romanized: Valikāmam Kiḻakku	Sinhala: වලිගම නැගෙනහිර, romanized: Valigama Neganahira	Valikamam East Divisional Council	Atchuvely North	J/285
Valikamam East	Tamil: வலிகாமம் கிழக்கு, romanized: Valikāmam Kiḻakku	Sinhala: වලිගම නැගෙනහිර, romanized: Valigama Neganahira	Valikamam East Divisional Council	Atchuvely South	J/286
Valikamam East	Tamil: வலிகாமம் கிழக்கு, romanized: Valikāmam Kiḻakku	Sinhala: වලිගම නැගෙනහිර, romanized: Valigama Neganahira	Valikamam East Divisional Council	Atchuvely West	J/287
Valikamam North	Tamil: வலிகாமம் வடக்கு, romanized: Valikāmam Vaṭakku	Sinhala: වලිගම උතුර, romanized: Valigama Uthura	Valikamam North Divisional Council	Mallakam South	J/212
Valikamam North	Tamil: வலிகாமம் வடக்கு, romanized: Valikāmam Vaṭakku	Sinhala: වලිගම උතුර, romanized: Valigama Uthura	Valikamam North Divisional Council	Mallakam Centre	J/213
Valikamam North	Tamil: வலிகாமம் வடக்கு, romanized: Valikāmam Vaṭakku	Sinhala: වලිගම උතුර, romanized: Valigama Uthura	Valikamam North Divisional Council	Mallakam North	J/214
Valikamam North	Tamil: வலிகாமம் வடக்கு, romanized: Valikāmam Vaṭakku	Sinhala: වලිගම උතුර, romanized: Valigama Uthura	Valikamam North Divisional Council	Alaveddy North	J/215
Valikamam North	Tamil: வலிகாமம் வடக்கு, romanized: Valikāmam Vaṭakku	Sinhala: වලිගම උතුර, romanized: Valigama Uthura	Valikamam North Divisional Council	Alaveddy Centre	J/216
Valikamam North	Tamil: வலிகாமம் வடக்கு, romanized: Valikāmam Vaṭakku	Sinhala: වලිගම උතුර, romanized: Valigama Uthura	Valikamam North Divisional Council	Alaveddy East	J/217
Valikamam North	Tamil: வலிகாமம் வடக்கு, romanized: Valikāmam Vaṭakku	Sinhala: වලිගම උතුර, romanized: Valigama Uthura	Valikamam North Divisional Council	Kaneswaram	J/218
Valikamam North	Tamil: வலிகாமம் வடக்கு, romanized: Valikāmam Vaṭakku	Sinhala: වලිගම උතුර, romanized: Valigama Uthura	Valikamam North Divisional Council	Alaveddy South	J/219
Valikamam North	Tamil: வலிகாமம் வடக்கு, romanized: Valikāmam Vaṭakku	Sinhala: වලිගම උතුර, romanized: Valigama Uthura	Valikamam North Divisional Council	Alaveddy West	J/220
Valikamam North	Tamil: வலிகாமம் வடக்கு, romanized: Valikāmam Vaṭakku	Sinhala: වලිගම උතුර, romanized: Valigama Uthura	Valikamam North Divisional Council	Ilavalai North	J/221
Valikamam North	Tamil: வலிகாமம் வடக்கு, romanized: Valikāmam Vaṭakku	Sinhala: වලිගම උතුර, romanized: Valigama Uthura	Valikamam North Divisional Council	Ilavalai Northwest	J/222
Valikamam North	Tamil: வலிகாமம் வடக்கு, romanized: Valikāmam Vaṭakku	Sinhala: වලිගම උතුර, romanized: Valigama Uthura	Valikamam North Divisional Council	Viththukapuram	J/223
Valikamam North	Tamil: வலிகாமம் வடக்கு, romanized: Valikāmam Vaṭakku	Sinhala: වලිගම උතුර, romanized: Valigama Uthura	Valikamam North Divisional Council	Pannalai	J/224
Valikamam North	Tamil: வலிகாமம் வடக்கு, romanized: Valikāmam Vaṭakku	Sinhala: වලිගම උතුර, romanized: Valigama Uthura	Valikamam North Divisional Council	Kollankaladdy	J/225
Valikamam North	Tamil: வலிகாமம் வடக்கு, romanized: Valikāmam Vaṭakku	Sinhala: වලිගම උතුර, romanized: Valigama Uthura	Valikamam North Divisional Council	Nakuleswaram	J/226
Valikamam North	Tamil: வலிகாமம் வடக்கு, romanized: Valikāmam Vaṭakku	Sinhala: වලිගම උතුර, romanized: Valigama Uthura	Valikamam North Divisional Council	Tellipalai East	J/227
Valikamam North	Tamil: வலிகாமம் வடக்கு, romanized: Valikāmam Vaṭakku	Sinhala: වලිගම උතුර, romanized: Valigama Uthura	Valikamam North Divisional Council	Tellipalai	J/228
Valikamam North	Tamil: வலிகாமம் வடக்கு, romanized: Valikāmam Vaṭakku	Sinhala: වලිගම උතුර, romanized: Valigama Uthura	Valikamam North Divisional Council	Thurkkapuram	J/229
Valikamam North	Tamil: வலிகாமம் வடக்கு, romanized: Valikāmam Vaṭakku	Sinhala: වලිගම උතුර, romanized: Valigama Uthura	Valikamam North Divisional Council	Thanthaiselvapuram	J/230
Valikamam North	Tamil: வலிகாமம் வடக்கு, romanized: Valikāmam Vaṭakku	Sinhala: වලිගම උතුර, romanized: Valigama Uthura	Valikamam North Divisional Council	Maviddapuram	J/231
Valikamam North	Tamil: வலிகாமம் வடக்கு, romanized: Valikāmam Vaṭakku	Sinhala: වලිගම උතුර, romanized: Valigama Uthura	Valikamam North Divisional Council	Maviddapuram South	J/232
Valikamam North	Tamil: வலிகாமம் வடக்கு, romanized: Valikāmam Vaṭakku	Sinhala: වලිගම උතුර, romanized: Valigama Uthura	Valikamam North Divisional Council	Kankesanthurai West	J/233
Valikamam North	Tamil: வலிகாமம் வடக்கு, romanized: Valikāmam Vaṭakku	Sinhala: වලිගම උතුර, romanized: Valigama Uthura	Valikamam North Divisional Council	Kankesanthurai Centre	J/234
Valikamam North	Tamil: வலிகாமம் வடக்கு, romanized: Valikāmam Vaṭakku	Sinhala: වලිගම උතුර, romanized: Valigama Uthura	Valikamam North Divisional Council	Kankesanthurai South	J/235
Valikamam North	Tamil: வலிகாமம் வடக்கு, romanized: Valikāmam Vaṭakku	Sinhala: වලිගම උතුර, romanized: Valigama Uthura	Valikamam North Divisional Council	Palai Veemankamam North	J/236
Valikamam North	Tamil: வலிகாமம் வடக்கு, romanized: Valikāmam Vaṭakku	Sinhala: වලිගම උතුර, romanized: Valigama Uthura	Valikamam North Divisional Council	Palai Veemankamam South	J/237
Valikamam North	Tamil: வலிகாமம் வடக்கு, romanized: Valikāmam Vaṭakku	Sinhala: වලිගම උතුර, romanized: Valigama Uthura	Valikamam North Divisional Council	Kadduvan	J/238
Valikamam North	Tamil: வலிகாமம் வடக்கு, romanized: Valikāmam Vaṭakku	Sinhala: වලිගම උතුර, romanized: Valigama Uthura	Valikamam North Divisional Council	Kadduvan West	J/239
Valikamam North	Tamil: வலிகாமம் வடக்கு, romanized: Valikāmam Vaṭakku	Sinhala: වලිගම උතුර, romanized: Valigama Uthura	Valikamam North Divisional Council	Thenmaiyilai	J/240
Valikamam North	Tamil: வலிகாமம் வடக்கு, romanized: Valikāmam Vaṭakku	Sinhala: වලිගම උතුර, romanized: Valigama Uthura	Valikamam North Divisional Council	Varuththalaivilan	J/241
Valikamam North	Tamil: வலிகாமம் வடக்கு, romanized: Valikāmam Vaṭakku	Sinhala: වලිගම උතුර, romanized: Valigama Uthura	Valikamam North Divisional Council	Kurumpasiddy	J/242
Valikamam North	Tamil: வலிகாமம் வடக்கு, romanized: Valikāmam Vaṭakku	Sinhala: වලිගම උතුර, romanized: Valigama Uthura	Valikamam North Divisional Council	Kurumpasiddy East	J/243
Valikamam North	Tamil: வலிகாமம் வடக்கு, romanized: Valikāmam Vaṭakku	Sinhala: වලිගම උතුර, romanized: Valigama Uthura	Valikamam North Divisional Council	Vasavilan East	J/244
Valikamam North	Tamil: வலிகாமம் வடக்கு, romanized: Valikāmam Vaṭakku	Sinhala: වලිගම උතුර, romanized: Valigama Uthura	Valikamam North Divisional Council	Vasavilan West	J/245
Valikamam North	Tamil: வலிகாமம் வடக்கு, romanized: Valikāmam Vaṭakku	Sinhala: වලිගම උතුර, romanized: Valigama Uthura	Valikamam North Divisional Council	Mailiddy North	J/246
Valikamam North	Tamil: வலிகாமம் வடக்கு, romanized: Valikāmam Vaṭakku	Sinhala: වලිගම උතුර, romanized: Valigama Uthura	Valikamam North Divisional Council	Thaiyiddy East	J/247
Valikamam North	Tamil: வலிகாமம் வடக்கு, romanized: Valikāmam Vaṭakku	Sinhala: වලිගම උතුර, romanized: Valigama Uthura	Valikamam North Divisional Council	Mailiddy Thurai South	J/248
Valikamam North	Tamil: வலிகாமம் வடக்கு, romanized: Valikāmam Vaṭakku	Sinhala: වලිගම උතුර, romanized: Valigama Uthura	Valikamam North Divisional Council	Thaiyiddy North	J/249
Valikamam North	Tamil: வலிகாமம் வடக்கு, romanized: Valikāmam Vaṭakku	Sinhala: වලිගම උතුර, romanized: Valigama Uthura	Valikamam North Divisional Council	Thaiyiddy South	J/250
Valikamam North	Tamil: வலிகாமம் வடக்கு, romanized: Valikāmam Vaṭakku	Sinhala: වලිගම උතුර, romanized: Valigama Uthura	Valikamam North Divisional Council	Mailiddy Thurai North	J/251
Valikamam North	Tamil: வலிகாமம் வடக்கு, romanized: Valikāmam Vaṭakku	Sinhala: වලිගම උතුර, romanized: Valigama Uthura	Valikamam North Divisional Council	Palaly South	J/252
Valikamam North	Tamil: வலிகாமம் வடக்கு, romanized: Valikāmam Vaṭakku	Sinhala: වලිගම උතුර, romanized: Valigama Uthura	Valikamam North Divisional Council	Palaly East	J/253
Valikamam North	Tamil: வலிகாமம் வடக்கு, romanized: Valikāmam Vaṭakku	Sinhala: වලිගම උතුර, romanized: Valigama Uthura	Valikamam North Divisional Council	Palaly North	J/254
Valikamam North	Tamil: வலிகாமம் வடக்கு, romanized: Valikāmam Vaṭakku	Sinhala: වලිගම උතුර, romanized: Valigama Uthura	Valikamam North Divisional Council	Palaly Northwest	J/255
Valikamam North	Tamil: வலிகாமம் வடக்கு, romanized: Valikāmam Vaṭakku	Sinhala: වලිගම උතුර, romanized: Valigama Uthura	Valikamam North Divisional Council	Palaly West	J/256
Valikamam South	Tamil: வலிகாமம் தெற்கு, romanized: Valikāmam Teṟku	Sinhala: වලිගම දකුණ, romanized: Valigama Dakuna	Valikamam South Divisional Council	Uduvil South West	J/182
Valikamam South	Tamil: வலிகாமம் தெற்கு, romanized: Valikāmam Teṟku	Sinhala: වලිගම දකුණ, romanized: Valigama Dakuna	Valikamam South Divisional Council	Uduvil South East	J/183
Valikamam South	Tamil: வலிகாமம் தெற்கு, romanized: Valikāmam Teṟku	Sinhala: වලිගම දකුණ, romanized: Valigama Dakuna	Valikamam South Divisional Council	Uduvil Centre	J/184
Valikamam South	Tamil: வலிகாமம் தெற்கு, romanized: Valikāmam Teṟku	Sinhala: වලිගම දකුණ, romanized: Valigama Dakuna	Valikamam South Divisional Council	Uduvil Centre North	J/185
Valikamam South	Tamil: வலிகாமம் தெற்கு, romanized: Valikāmam Teṟku	Sinhala: වලිගම දකුණ, romanized: Valigama Dakuna	Valikamam South Divisional Council	Uduvil North	J/186
Valikamam South	Tamil: வலிகாமம் தெற்கு, romanized: Valikāmam Teṟku	Sinhala: වලිගම දකුණ, romanized: Valigama Dakuna	Valikamam South Divisional Council	Sanguvely	J/187
Valikamam South	Tamil: வலிகாமம் தெற்கு, romanized: Valikāmam Teṟku	Sinhala: වලිගම දකුණ, romanized: Valigama Dakuna	Valikamam South Divisional Council	Inuvil South West	J/188
Valikamam South	Tamil: வலிகாமம் தெற்கு, romanized: Valikāmam Teṟku	Sinhala: වලිගම දකුණ, romanized: Valigama Dakuna	Valikamam South Divisional Council	Inuvil East	J/189
Valikamam South	Tamil: வலிகாமம் தெற்கு, romanized: Valikāmam Teṟku	Sinhala: වලිගම දකුණ, romanized: Valigama Dakuna	Valikamam South Divisional Council	Inuvil North East	J/190
Valikamam South	Tamil: வலிகாமம் தெற்கு, romanized: Valikāmam Teṟku	Sinhala: වලිගම දකුණ, romanized: Valigama Dakuna	Valikamam South Divisional Council	Inuvil East	J/191
Valikamam South	Tamil: வலிகாமம் தெற்கு, romanized: Valikāmam Teṟku	Sinhala: වලිගම දකුණ, romanized: Valigama Dakuna	Valikamam South Divisional Council	Thavady South	J/192
Valikamam South	Tamil: வலிகாமம் தெற்கு, romanized: Valikāmam Teṟku	Sinhala: වලිගම දකුණ, romanized: Valigama Dakuna	Valikamam South Divisional Council	Thavady East	J/193
Valikamam South	Tamil: வலிகாமம் தெற்கு, romanized: Valikāmam Teṟku	Sinhala: වලිගම දකුණ, romanized: Valigama Dakuna	Valikamam South Divisional Council	Thavady North	J/194
Valikamam South	Tamil: வலிகாமம் தெற்கு, romanized: Valikāmam Teṟku	Sinhala: වලිගම දකුණ, romanized: Valigama Dakuna	Valikamam South Divisional Council	Chunnakam North	J/195
Valikamam South	Tamil: வலிகாமம் தெற்கு, romanized: Valikāmam Teṟku	Sinhala: වලිගම දකුණ, romanized: Valigama Dakuna	Valikamam South Divisional Council	Chunnakam South	J/196
Valikamam South	Tamil: வலிகாமம் தெற்கு, romanized: Valikāmam Teṟku	Sinhala: වලිගම දකුණ, romanized: Valigama Dakuna	Valikamam South Divisional Council	Chunnakam East	J/197
Valikamam South	Tamil: வலிகாமம் தெற்கு, romanized: Valikāmam Teṟku	Sinhala: වලිගම දකුණ, romanized: Valigama Dakuna	Valikamam South Divisional Council	Chunnakam Centre	J/198
Valikamam South	Tamil: வலிகாமம் தெற்கு, romanized: Valikāmam Teṟku	Sinhala: වලිගම දකුණ, romanized: Valigama Dakuna	Valikamam South Divisional Council	Chunnakam West	J/199
Valikamam South	Tamil: வலிகாமம் தெற்கு, romanized: Valikāmam Teṟku	Sinhala: වලිගම දකුණ, romanized: Valigama Dakuna	Valikamam South Divisional Council	Kantharodai	J/200
Valikamam South	Tamil: வலிகாமம் தெற்கு, romanized: Valikāmam Teṟku	Sinhala: වලිගම දකුණ, romanized: Valigama Dakuna	Valikamam South Divisional Council	Erlalai West	J/201
Valikamam South	Tamil: வலிகாமம் தெற்கு, romanized: Valikāmam Teṟku	Sinhala: වලිගම දකුණ, romanized: Valigama Dakuna	Valikamam South Divisional Council	Erlalai South West	J/202
Valikamam South	Tamil: வலிகாமம் தெற்கு, romanized: Valikāmam Teṟku	Sinhala: වලිගම දකුණ, romanized: Valigama Dakuna	Valikamam South Divisional Council	Erlalai South	J/203
Valikamam South	Tamil: வலிகாமம் தெற்கு, romanized: Valikāmam Teṟku	Sinhala: වලිගම දකුණ, romanized: Valigama Dakuna	Valikamam South Divisional Council	Erlalai East	J/204
Valikamam South	Tamil: வலிகாமம் தெற்கு, romanized: Valikāmam Teṟku	Sinhala: වලිගම දකුණ, romanized: Valigama Dakuna	Valikamam South Divisional Council	Erlalai North	J/205
Valikamam South	Tamil: வலிகாமம் தெற்கு, romanized: Valikāmam Teṟku	Sinhala: වලිගම දකුණ, romanized: Valigama Dakuna	Valikamam South Divisional Council	Erlalai Centre	J/206
Valikamam South	Tamil: வலிகாமம் தெற்கு, romanized: Valikāmam Teṟku	Sinhala: වලිගම දකුණ, romanized: Valigama Dakuna	Valikamam South Divisional Council	Punnalaikkadduvan South	J/207
Valikamam South	Tamil: வலிகாமம் தெற்கு, romanized: Valikāmam Teṟku	Sinhala: වලිගම දකුණ, romanized: Valigama Dakuna	Valikamam South Divisional Council	Punnalaikkadduvan North	J/208
Valikamam South	Tamil: வலிகாமம் தெற்கு, romanized: Valikāmam Teṟku	Sinhala: වලිගම දකුණ, romanized: Valigama Dakuna	Valikamam South Divisional Council	Evinai	J/209
Valikamam South	Tamil: வலிகாமம் தெற்கு, romanized: Valikāmam Teṟku	Sinhala: වලිගම දකුණ, romanized: Valigama Dakuna	Valikamam South Divisional Council	Kuppilan South	J/210
Valikamam South	Tamil: வலிகாமம் தெற்கு, romanized: Valikāmam Teṟku	Sinhala: වලිගම දකුණ, romanized: Valigama Dakuna	Valikamam South Divisional Council	Kuppilan North	J/211
Valikamam South-West	Tamil: வலிகாமம் தெற்கு மேற்கு, romanized: Valikāmam Teṟku Mēṟku	Sinhala: වලිගම දකුණු බටහිර, romanized: Valigama Dakuna Batahira	Valikamam South-West Divisional Council	Suthumalai North	J/129
Valikamam South-West	Tamil: வலிகாமம் தெற்கு மேற்கு, romanized: Valikāmam Teṟku Mēṟku	Sinhala: වලිගම දකුණු බටහිර, romanized: Valigama Dakuna Batahira	Valikamam South-West Divisional Council	Suthumalai South	J/130
Valikamam South-West	Tamil: வலிகாமம் தெற்கு மேற்கு, romanized: Valikāmam Teṟku Mēṟku	Sinhala: වලිගම දකුණු බටහිර, romanized: Valigama Dakuna Batahira	Valikamam South-West Divisional Council	Chavalkaddu	J/131
Valikamam South-West	Tamil: வலிகாமம் தெற்கு மேற்கு, romanized: Valikāmam Teṟku Mēṟku	Sinhala: වලිගම දකුණු බටහිර, romanized: Valigama Dakuna Batahira	Valikamam South-West Divisional Council	Uyarapulam	J/132
Valikamam South-West	Tamil: வலிகாமம் தெற்கு மேற்கு, romanized: Valikāmam Teṟku Mēṟku	Sinhala: වලිගම දකුණු බටහිර, romanized: Valigama Dakuna Batahira	Valikamam South-West Divisional Council	Anaicoddai	J/133
Valikamam South-West	Tamil: வலிகாமம் தெற்கு மேற்கு, romanized: Valikāmam Teṟku Mēṟku	Sinhala: වලිගම දකුණු බටහිර, romanized: Valigama Dakuna Batahira	Valikamam South-West Divisional Council	Navali North	J/134
Valikamam South-West	Tamil: வலிகாமம் தெற்கு மேற்கு, romanized: Valikāmam Teṟku Mēṟku	Sinhala: වලිගම දකුණු බටහිර, romanized: Valigama Dakuna Batahira	Valikamam South-West Divisional Council	Navali East	J/135
Valikamam South-West	Tamil: வலிகாமம் தெற்கு மேற்கு, romanized: Valikāmam Teṟku Mēṟku	Sinhala: වලිගම දකුණු බටහිර, romanized: Valigama Dakuna Batahira	Valikamam South-West Divisional Council	Navali South	J/136
Valikamam South-West	Tamil: வலிகாமம் தெற்கு மேற்கு, romanized: Valikāmam Teṟku Mēṟku	Sinhala: වලිගම දකුණු බටහිර, romanized: Valigama Dakuna Batahira	Valikamam South-West Divisional Council	Manipay North	J/137
Valikamam South-West	Tamil: வலிகாமம் தெற்கு மேற்கு, romanized: Valikāmam Teṟku Mēṟku	Sinhala: වලිගම දකුණු බටහිර, romanized: Valigama Dakuna Batahira	Valikamam South-West Divisional Council	Manipay West	J/138
Valikamam South-West	Tamil: வலிகாமம் தெற்கு மேற்கு, romanized: Valikāmam Teṟku Mēṟku	Sinhala: වලිගම දකුණු බටහිර, romanized: Valigama Dakuna Batahira	Valikamam South-West Divisional Council	Manipay South	J/139
Valikamam South-West	Tamil: வலிகாமம் தெற்கு மேற்கு, romanized: Valikāmam Teṟku Mēṟku	Sinhala: වලිගම දකුණු බටහිර, romanized: Valigama Dakuna Batahira	Valikamam South-West Divisional Council	Manipay East	J/140
Valikamam South-West	Tamil: வலிகாமம் தெற்கு மேற்கு, romanized: Valikāmam Teṟku Mēṟku	Sinhala: වලිගම දකුණු බටහිර, romanized: Valigama Dakuna Batahira	Valikamam South-West Divisional Council	Sandilipay North	J/141
Valikamam South-West	Tamil: வலிகாமம் தெற்கு மேற்கு, romanized: Valikāmam Teṟku Mēṟku	Sinhala: වලිගම දකුණු බටහිර, romanized: Valigama Dakuna Batahira	Valikamam South-West Divisional Council	Sandilipay Centre	J/142
Valikamam South-West	Tamil: வலிகாமம் தெற்கு மேற்கு, romanized: Valikāmam Teṟku Mēṟku	Sinhala: වලිගම දකුණු බටහිර, romanized: Valigama Dakuna Batahira	Valikamam South-West Divisional Council	Sandilipay West	J/143
Valikamam South-West	Tamil: வலிகாமம் தெற்கு மேற்கு, romanized: Valikāmam Teṟku Mēṟku	Sinhala: වලිගම දකුණු බටහිර, romanized: Valigama Dakuna Batahira	Valikamam South-West Divisional Council	Mahiyapiddy	J/144
Valikamam South-West	Tamil: வலிகாமம் தெற்கு மேற்கு, romanized: Valikāmam Teṟku Mēṟku	Sinhala: වලිගම දකුණු බටහිර, romanized: Valigama Dakuna Batahira	Valikamam South-West Divisional Council	Vadaliyadaippu	J/145
Valikamam South-West	Tamil: வலிகாமம் தெற்கு மேற்கு, romanized: Valikāmam Teṟku Mēṟku	Sinhala: වලිගම දකුණු බටහිර, romanized: Valigama Dakuna Batahira	Valikamam South-West Divisional Council	Pandatharippu	J/146
Valikamam South-West	Tamil: வலிகாமம் தெற்கு மேற்கு, romanized: Valikāmam Teṟku Mēṟku	Sinhala: වලිගම දකුණු බටහිර, romanized: Valigama Dakuna Batahira	Valikamam South-West Divisional Council	Piranpattu	J/147
Valikamam South-West	Tamil: வலிகாமம் தெற்கு மேற்கு, romanized: Valikāmam Teṟku Mēṟku	Sinhala: වලිගම දකුණු බටහිර, romanized: Valigama Dakuna Batahira	Valikamam South-West Divisional Council	Sillalai North	J/148
Valikamam South-West	Tamil: வலிகாமம் தெற்கு மேற்கு, romanized: Valikāmam Teṟku Mēṟku	Sinhala: වලිගම දකුණු බටහිර, romanized: Valigama Dakuna Batahira	Valikamam South-West Divisional Council	Sillalai South	J/149
Valikamam South-West	Tamil: வலிகாமம் தெற்கு மேற்கு, romanized: Valikāmam Teṟku Mēṟku	Sinhala: වලිගම දකුණු බටහිර, romanized: Valigama Dakuna Batahira	Valikamam South-West Divisional Council	Mathagal East	J/150
Valikamam South-West	Tamil: வலிகாமம் தெற்கு மேற்கு, romanized: Valikāmam Teṟku Mēṟku	Sinhala: වලිගම දකුණු බටහිර, romanized: Valigama Dakuna Batahira	Valikamam South-West Divisional Council	Mathagal South	J/151
Valikamam South-West	Tamil: வலிகாமம் தெற்கு மேற்கு, romanized: Valikāmam Teṟku Mēṟku	Sinhala: වලිගම දකුණු බටහිර, romanized: Valigama Dakuna Batahira	Valikamam South-West Divisional Council	Mathagal West	J/152
Valikamam South-West	Tamil: வலிகாமம் தெற்கு மேற்கு, romanized: Valikāmam Teṟku Mēṟku	Sinhala: වලිගම දකුණු බටහිර, romanized: Valigama Dakuna Batahira	Valikamam South-West Divisional Council	Periyavilan	J/153
Valikamam South-West	Tamil: வலிகாமம் தெற்கு மேற்கு, romanized: Valikāmam Teṟku Mēṟku	Sinhala: වලිගම දකුණු බටහිර, romanized: Valigama Dakuna Batahira	Valikamam South-West Divisional Council	Mareesankoodal	J/154
Valikamam South-West	Tamil: வலிகாமம் தெற்கு மேற்கு, romanized: Valikāmam Teṟku Mēṟku	Sinhala: වලිගම දකුණු බටහිර, romanized: Valigama Dakuna Batahira	Valikamam South-West Divisional Council	Ilavalai	J/155
Valikamam South-West	Tamil: வலிகாமம் தெற்கு மேற்கு, romanized: Valikāmam Teṟku Mēṟku	Sinhala: වලිගම දකුණු බටහිර, romanized: Valigama Dakuna Batahira	Valikamam South-West Divisional Council	Mullanai	J/156
Valikamam West	Tamil: வலிகாமம் மேற்கு, romanized: Valikāmam Mēṟku	Sinhala: වලිගම බටහිර, romanized: Valigama Batahira	Valikamam West Divisional Council	Vaddukoddai East	J/157
Valikamam West	Tamil: வலிகாமம் மேற்கு, romanized: Valikāmam Mēṟku	Sinhala: වලිගම බටහිර, romanized: Valigama Batahira	Valikamam West Divisional Council	Vaddukoddai North	J/158
Valikamam West	Tamil: வலிகாமம் மேற்கு, romanized: Valikāmam Mēṟku	Sinhala: වලිගම බටහිර, romanized: Valigama Batahira	Valikamam West Divisional Council	Vaddukoddai Centre	J/159
Valikamam West	Tamil: வலிகாமம் மேற்கு, romanized: Valikāmam Mēṟku	Sinhala: වලිගම බටහිර, romanized: Valigama Batahira	Valikamam West Divisional Council	Araly West	J/160
Valikamam West	Tamil: வலிகாமம் மேற்கு, romanized: Valikāmam Mēṟku	Sinhala: වලිගම බටහිර, romanized: Valigama Batahira	Valikamam West Divisional Council	Araly Centre	J/161
Valikamam West	Tamil: வலிகாமம் மேற்கு, romanized: Valikāmam Mēṟku	Sinhala: වලිගම බටහිර, romanized: Valigama Batahira	Valikamam West Divisional Council	Araly South	J/162
Valikamam West	Tamil: வலிகாமம் மேற்கு, romanized: Valikāmam Mēṟku	Sinhala: වලිගම බටහිර, romanized: Valigama Batahira	Valikamam West Divisional Council	Araly East	J/163
Valikamam West	Tamil: வலிகாமம் மேற்கு, romanized: Valikāmam Mēṟku	Sinhala: වලිගම බටහිර, romanized: Valigama Batahira	Valikamam West Divisional Council	Araly North	J/164
Valikamam West	Tamil: வலிகாமம் மேற்கு, romanized: Valikāmam Mēṟku	Sinhala: වලිගම බටහිර, romanized: Valigama Batahira	Valikamam West Divisional Council	Vaddukoddai South	J/165
Valikamam West	Tamil: வலிகாமம் மேற்கு, romanized: Valikāmam Mēṟku	Sinhala: වලිගම බටහිර, romanized: Valigama Batahira	Valikamam West Divisional Council	Vaddukoddai South-West	J/166
Valikamam West	Tamil: வலிகாமம் மேற்கு, romanized: Valikāmam Mēṟku	Sinhala: වලිගම බටහිර, romanized: Valigama Batahira	Valikamam West Divisional Council	Vaddukoddai West	J/167
Valikamam West	Tamil: வலிகாமம் மேற்கு, romanized: Valikāmam Mēṟku	Sinhala: වලිගම බටහිර, romanized: Valigama Batahira	Valikamam West Divisional Council	Chulipuram West	J/168
Valikamam West	Tamil: வலிகாமம் மேற்கு, romanized: Valikāmam Mēṟku	Sinhala: වලිගම බටහිර, romanized: Valigama Batahira	Valikamam West Divisional Council	Chulipuram Centre	J/169
Valikamam West	Tamil: வலிகாமம் மேற்கு, romanized: Valikāmam Mēṟku	Sinhala: වලිගම බටහිර, romanized: Valigama Batahira	Valikamam West Divisional Council	Chulipuram East	J/170
Valikamam West	Tamil: வலிகாமம் மேற்கு, romanized: Valikāmam Mēṟku	Sinhala: වලිගම බටහිර, romanized: Valigama Batahira	Valikamam West Divisional Council	Moolai	J/171
Valikamam West	Tamil: வலிகாமம் மேற்கு, romanized: Valikāmam Mēṟku	Sinhala: වලිගම බටහිර, romanized: Valigama Batahira	Valikamam West Divisional Council	Sittankerny	J/172
Valikamam West	Tamil: வலிகாமம் மேற்கு, romanized: Valikāmam Mēṟku	Sinhala: වලිගම බටහිර, romanized: Valigama Batahira	Valikamam West Divisional Council	Sittankerny East	J/173
Valikamam West	Tamil: வலிகாமம் மேற்கு, romanized: Valikāmam Mēṟku	Sinhala: වලිගම බටහිර, romanized: Valigama Batahira	Valikamam West Divisional Council	Sittankerny South	J/174
Valikamam West	Tamil: வலிகாமம் மேற்கு, romanized: Valikāmam Mēṟku	Sinhala: වලිගම බටහිර, romanized: Valigama Batahira	Valikamam West Divisional Council	Sittankerny West	J/175
Valikamam West	Tamil: வலிகாமம் மேற்கு, romanized: Valikāmam Mēṟku	Sinhala: වලිගම බටහිර, romanized: Valigama Batahira	Valikamam West Divisional Council	Sittankerny North	J/176
Valikamam West	Tamil: வலிகாமம் மேற்கு, romanized: Valikāmam Mēṟku	Sinhala: වලිගම බටහිර, romanized: Valigama Batahira	Valikamam West Divisional Council	Chankanai East	J/177
Valikamam West	Tamil: வலிகாமம் மேற்கு, romanized: Valikāmam Mēṟku	Sinhala: වලිගම බටහිර, romanized: Valigama Batahira	Valikamam West Divisional Council	Chankanai West	J/178
Valikamam West	Tamil: வலிகாமம் மேற்கு, romanized: Valikāmam Mēṟku	Sinhala: වලිගම බටහිර, romanized: Valigama Batahira	Valikamam West Divisional Council	Chankanai Centre	J/179
Valikamam West	Tamil: வலிகாமம் மேற்கு, romanized: Valikāmam Mēṟku	Sinhala: වලිගම බටහිර, romanized: Valigama Batahira	Valikamam West Divisional Council	Chankanai South	J/180
Valikamam West	Tamil: வலிகாமம் மேற்கு, romanized: Valikāmam Mēṟku	Sinhala: වලිගම බටහිර, romanized: Valigama Batahira	Valikamam West Divisional Council	Chankanai North	J/181

== See also ==
- Piranpattu
- Thenmarachchi
- Vadamarachchi
