= Araly =

Araly அராலி අරාලි
- Town
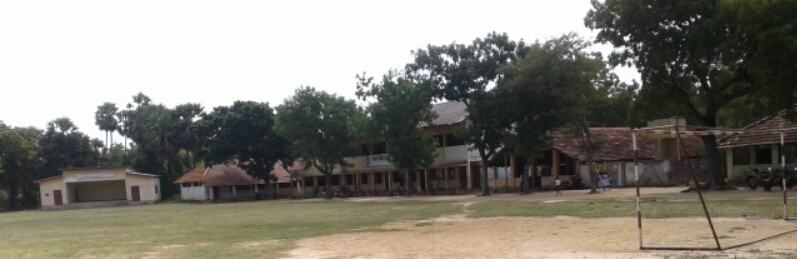

- Location within Northern Province
- Coordinates: 9°42′22″N 79°57′0″E
- Country: Sri Lanka
- Province: Northern
- District: Jaffna
- DS Division: Valikamam West

Population (2012)
  - Total: 9,465

Araly (Tamil: அராலி, romanized: Arāli) is a town in Northern Jaffna District, Sri Lanka. It is located 8.6 km (5.34 mi) North West from the city of Jaffna. It is bordered by sea on both sides and surrounded by villages like Ponnalai, Moolai, Vaddukoddai, Sankarathai and Navali. Vazhukkai Aaru empties at the Araly Barrage. During the Sri Lankan Civil War, the rebel Liberation Tigers of Tamil Eelam (LTTE) occupied Araly in 1986. The Indian Peace Keeping Force (IPKF) briefly occupied the city in 1987. The LTTE again occupied the village from 1989 until 1995, when the Sri Lankan Army regained control. The population as of 2012 was 9,465.

== Schools ==
School	Grades	Type	Roll	Address	Medium	Sex	Gat1	Admin District	Zone	Div
Araly Saraswathy Maha Vidyalayam சரஸ்வதி மஹா வித்தியாலயம்	1-13	1C	500	Araly South	Tamil	Mixed	Pro	JAF	JAF	Chankanai
Araly Hindu College	1-11	2	453	Araly North	Tamil	Mixed	Pro	JAF	JAF	Chankanai
A.M.T.M. School, Araly East	1-11	2	254	Araly East	Tamil	Mixed	Pro	JAF	JAF	Chankanai
Valliammai Memorial School	1-11	2	359	Araly Central	Tamil	Mixed	Pro	JAF	JAF	Chankanai
Murugamoorthy Vidyalayam	1-5	3	91	Araly Central	Tamil	Mixed	Pro	JAF	JAF	Chankanai
A.M.T.M. School, Araly North	1-5	3	57	Araly North	Tamil	Mixed	Pro	JAF	JAF	Chankanai

== Temples ==
- Araly Avarampitti Sri Muththumari Amman Kovil
- Araly Karaippiddy Pillaiyar Temple
- Kalavathurai Vairavar Kovil
- Araly Ahayakulam Vinayagar Aalayam
- Araly Vannapuram Sivan Kovil
- Araly North Mailiyatpuram Kanthaswamy Kovil
- Araly North Gnana vyravar temple
- Araly North Muruka moorthy temple
- Araly malaiyalankadu Aiyanar Temple

== Sports clubs ==
There are number of sports clubs in Araly. Some of them are listed below. These clubs mainly have football teams. Araly Mawathai Sports club conducts Uzhavar Vizha (Farmers' Festival) on Thai Pongal day. It is a highlight event of Araly.

- Araly Mawathai Sports Club
- Araly Bharathi Sports Club(1959)
- Araly Silverstars Sports Club
- Araly Anna Sports Club
- Araly Kalavaththurai Sports Club
- Araly Kalaivani Sports Club
- Araly A.L. Sports Club
- Araly Nilaveli Sports Club
