= Ilavalai =

Ilavalai இளவாலை ඉලවාලෙයි
- Village
- Location in the Northern Province
- Coordinates: 9°47′42″N 79°59′34″E
- Country: Sri Lanka
- Province: Northern
- District: Jaffna
- DS Division: Valikamam North

Government
  - Type: Divisional Secretariat
  - Body: Valikamam North
- Time zone: UTC+5:30 (Sri Lanka Standard Time Zone)
- Post Codes: 40000
- Telephone Codes: 021
- Vehicle registration: NP
- Website: www.ivvsangam.com

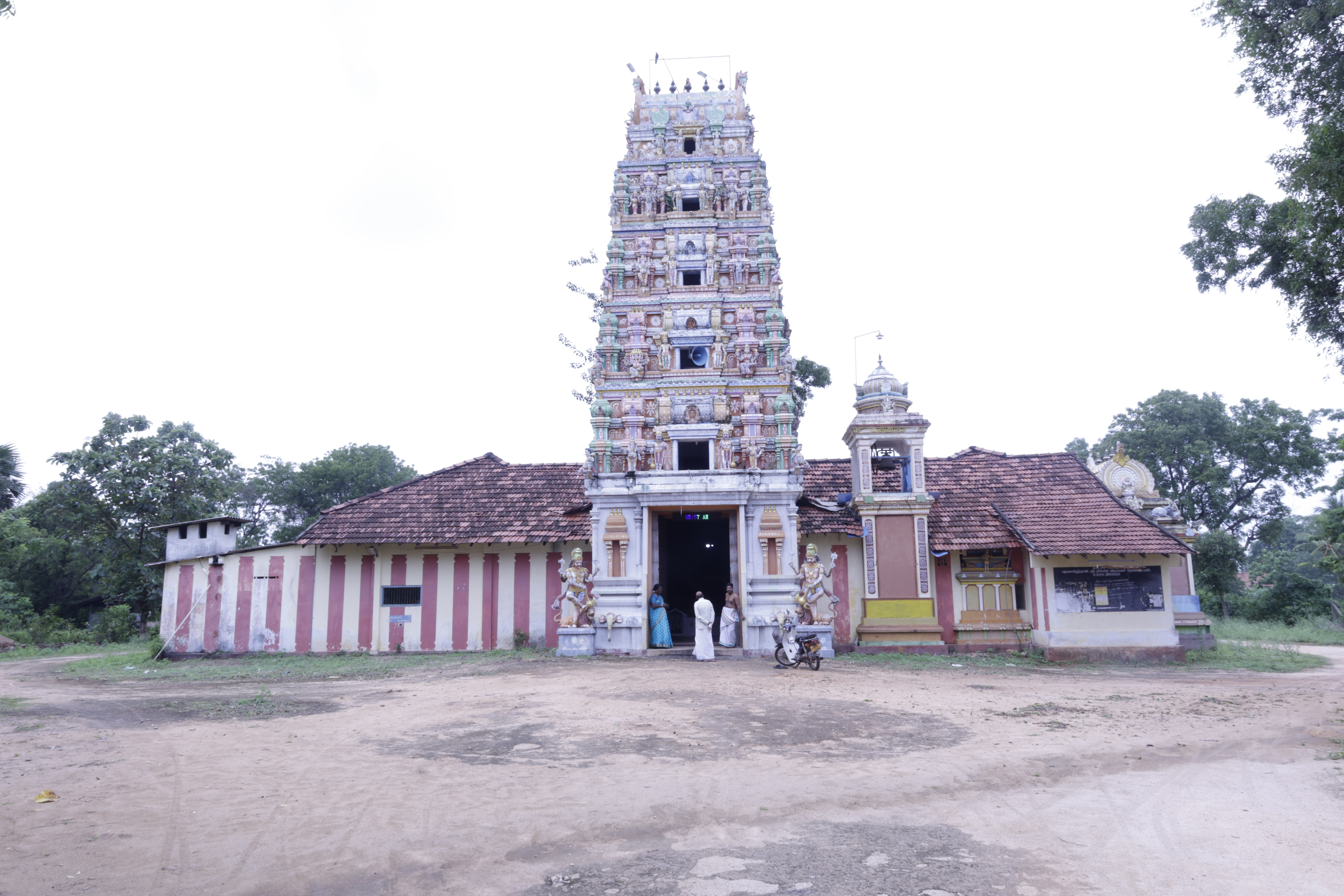

Ilavalai (Tamil: இளவாலை) is a coastal area located in (Valigamam North Divisional Secretariat) Jaffna, Sri Lanka. It is 16 km towards north from the Capital of the Northern Province, Jaffna, 8 km from the port town of Kankesanthurai and situated across the Sandilipay - Senthankulam main road.

There are numerous Catholic churches and Hindu temples within Ilavalai. One of the oldest churches is Ilavalai is the St. James' church, which is situated around the center of the village (St. James' lane).

Ilavalai Roman Catholic Tamil (R.C.T.) Boys' School, St. Henry's College, Ilavalai Convent Maha Vidyalayam, and Ilavalai Meihandan Maha Vidyalayam serve as educational institutions in Ilavalai. Ilavalai is known for its education and agricultural fertility, especially the cultivation of grapes, within the northern region of Sri Lanka.
