= Pannaippulam Grama Niladhari Division =

Pannaippulam
- Grama Niladhari Division
- Interactive map of Pannaippulam
- Coordinates: 9.771205°N 79.950850°E
- Country: Sri Lanka
- Province: Northern Province
- District: Jaffna District
- Divisional Secretariat: Valikamam West
- Electoral District: Jaffna Electoral District
- Polling Division: Vaddukoddai Polling Division

Area
  - Total: 0.95 km^{2} (0.37 sq mi)
- Elevation: 0 m (0 ft)

Population (2012)
  - Total: 1,293
  - Density: 1,361/km^{2} (3,520/sq mi)
- ISO 3166 code: LK-4106100

Panippulam

Panippulam Grama Niladhari Division is a Grama Niladhari Division of the Valikamam West Divisional Secretariat of Jaffna District of Northern Province, Sri Lanka. It has Grama Niladhari Division Code J/176.

Panippulam is a surrounded by the Sillalai South, Pannakam, Sillalai North, Vadaliadaippu and Chulipuram East Grama Niladhari Divisions.

== Demographics ==
=== Ethnicity ===
The Panippulam Grama Niladhari Division has a Sri Lankan Tamil majority (99.6%). In comparison, the Valikamam West (Chankanai) Divisional Secretariat (which contains the Panippulam Grama Niladhari Division) has a Sri Lankan Tamil majority (99.4%)

Ethnicity in Pannaippulam
1. Sri Lankan Tamil (99.6%)
2. Other (0.40%)

=== Religion ===
The Panippulam Grama Niladhari Division has a Hindu majority (92.3%). In comparison, the Valikamam West (Chankanai) Divisional Secretariat (which contains the Panippulam Grama Niladhari Division) has a Hindu majority (93.9%)

Religion in Panippulam
1. Hindu (92.3%)
2. Roman Catholic (7.10%)
3. Other (0.60%)
