= Valukkai Aru =

- Native name: வழுக்கை ஆறு (Tamil)

Location
- Country: Sri Lanka
- Province: Northern Province
- District: Jaffna District

Physical characteristics
- Source
  - location: Jaffna District
- Mouth: Jaffna Lagoon
  - location: Jaffna District
- Length: 16 km (9.9 mi)

The Valukkai Aru is a seasonal river in Northern Province, Sri Lanka. The only river on the Jaffna Peninsula, it rises near Tellippalai, before flowing south-west through Kandarodai, Sandilipay and Vaddukoddai. The river empties into Jaffna Lagoon near Araly.

== See also ==
- List of rivers of Sri Lanka
