= Valikamam East Divisional Council =

Local authority in Sri Lanka

Valikamam East pradeshiya sabha வலிகாமம் கிழக்கு பிரதேச சபை

Type
- Type: Local authority

Leadership
- Chairman: Thiagaraja Nirosh, TNA since July 2018
- Deputy Chairman: Tharmalingam Janarththanan, TNA since July 2025
- Seats: 21

Elections
- Last election: 2011 Sri Lankan local government elections

Valikamam East Divisional Council (Tamil: வலிகாமம் கிழக்கு பிரதேச சபை Valikāmam Kiḻakku Piratēca Capai; VEDC) is the local authority for Valikamam East DS Division in northern Sri Lanka. VEDC is responsible for providing a variety of local public services including roads, sanitation, drains, housing, libraries, public parks and recreational facilities. It has 21 members elected using the open list proportional representation system.

== History ==
In 1987 there was a major re-organisation of local government in Sri Lanka. District Development Councils were abolished and replaced by Divisional Councils (Pradeshiya Sabha or Pradesha Sabhai). The Pradeshiya Sabha Act No. 15 of 1987 was passed by Parliament on 15 April 1987 and on 1 January 1988 257 Divisional Councils started functioning. The Divisional Councils were generally commensurate with their namesake Divisional Secretary's Divisions. Valikamam East Divisional Council was established as the local authority for the Valikamam East DS Division. However, according to the pro-LTTE TamilNet, the Sri Lankan government had suspended all local government in the north and east of the country in 1983 using emergency regulations. The civil war prevented elections from being held for VEDC until 1998 as the LTTE did not hold elections when it controlled the area.

In March 1994 elections were held in the east and in Vavuniya in the north. However, elections weren't held in other areas of the north, including the Jaffna Peninsula, because most of these areas were at that time controlled by the rebel Tamil Tigers. In August 1995 the Sri Lankan military launched an offensive to recapture the Jaffna Peninsula. By December 1995 the military had captured most of the Valikamam region of the peninsula, including the city of Jaffna. By 16 May 1996 the military had recaptured the entire peninsula. In late 1996 the government announced elections would be held for 23 local authorities in Jaffna District, Kilinochchi District, Mannar District and Vavuniya District but following opposition from Tamil political parties postponed them. On 3 December 1997 the government announced that elections would be held for the 17 local authorities on the Jaffna Peninsula. The Tamil political parties were still opposed to holding elections as "normalcy" hadn't returned to the peninsula. The peninsula was under the firm grip of the Sri Lankan military and civil government had little, if any, role in the administration of the peninsula. The Tamil Tigers were also firmly against the elections being held. Despite these objections the elections were held on 29 January 1998.

== Election results ==
=== 1998 local government election ===
Results of the local government election held on 29 January 1998:

Alliances and parties	Votes	%	Seats
Eelam People's Democratic Party	3,978	37.48%	9
Democratic People's Liberation Front (PLOTE)	2,975	28.03%	5
Eelam People's Revolutionary Liberation Front	2,909	27.41%	5
Tamil Eelam Liberation Organization	752	7.08%	2
Valid Votes	10,614	100.00%	21
Rejected Votes	1,711		
Total Polled	12,325		
Registered Electors	54,386		
Turnout	22.66%		

On 1 January 2002 local authority elections were called for the entire country. It was later announced that elections would be held on 25 March 2002 in the north and east, and on 20 March 2002 in the rest of the country. The normal life term of Sri Lankan local government bodies is four years. The life term of VEDC expired in February 2002 but the central government extended this by another year, as the law allows. On 21 March 2002 the Election Commissioner announced that the elections in the north and east, except for eight local authorities in Ampara District, had been postponed until 25 September 2002. On 17 September 2002 elections in the north and east were postponed, for a second time, until 25 June 2003. Elections should have been held when the extension expired in February 2003 but in January 2003, following a request from the Tamil National Alliance, the central government instead dissolved VEDC using emergency powers and instead put in place special commissioners to administer the local area. In June 2003 elections in the north and east were postponed, for a third time, until 24 January 2004. In January 2004 elections in the north and east, except for local authorities in Ampara District, were postponed, for a fourth time, until 23 October 2004.

On 27 January 2006 local authority elections were called for the entire country. It was later announced that elections would be held on 30 March 2006 across the entire country. The Election Commissioner subsequently postponed the elections in the north and Batticaloa District until 30 September 2006. On 23 September 2006 elections in the north and Batticaloa District were postponed until 30 June 2007.

VEDC continued to be administered by special commissioners until the 2011 elections.

=== 2011 local government election ===
Results of the local government election held on 23 July 2011:

Alliances and parties	Votes	%	Seats
Tamil National Alliance (EPRLF (S), ITAK, PLOTE, TELO, TULF)	16,763	71.22%	16
United People's Freedom Alliance (EPDP, SLFP et al.)	6,635	28.19%	5
United National Party	113	0.48%	0
Janatha Vimukthi Peramuna	27	0.11%	0
Valid Votes	23,538	100.00%	21
Rejected Votes	2,302		
Total Polled	25,840		
Registered Electors	46,570		
Turnout	55.49%		

The following candidates were elected: Annalingam Uthayakumar (TNA), 3,773 preference votes (pv); Kandiah Tharmalingam (TNA), 2,673 pv; Thambyrasa Thirunavukarasu (TNA), 2,369 pv; Ramalingam Kandasamy (TNA), 2,364 pv; Navaratnam Rupathas (TNA), 2,361 pv; Ramanathan Ainkaran (UPFA), 2,135 pv; Tharumalingam Krishnarasa (TNA), 2,054 pv; Kandiah Thurairasa (TNA), 1,729 pv; Thampu Raveendran (TNA), 1,668 pv; Kandiah Nagaratnam (UPFA), 1,564 pv; Vairamuthu Subramaniam (TNA), 1,444 pv; Kanapathypillai Thuraisingam (TNA), 1,382 pv; Murukupillai Paheerathan (TNA), 1,342 pv; Rajah Premkumar (TNA), 1,025 pv; Suntharam Selvaratnam (TNA), 1,021 pv; Nagamani Rasanayagam (UPFA), 958 pv; Kirushnapillai Selvarasa (UPFA), 804 pv; Thambypillai Nithiyanantham (TNA), 787 pv; Asaippillai Vaseenthiran (UPFA), 754 pv; Kathirkamu Santhirabose (UPFA), 732 pv; and Gnanasegaram Tharmalingam Gnanasekaravel (TNA), 668 pv.

Annalingam Uthayakumar (TNA) and Kandiah Tharmalingam (TNA) were appointed Chairman and Deputy Chairman respectively.
