= Vaddukoddai West =

Vaddu West
- Grama Niladhari Division
- Location within Northern Province Location within Sri Lanka
- Country: Sri Lanka
- Province: Northern Province
- District: Jaffna
- Town: Vaddukoddai
- Divisional Secretariat: Valikamam West
- Electoral District: Jaffna Electoral District
- Polling Division: Vaddukoddai Polling Division
- Time zone: UTC+5:30 (Sri Lanka Standard Time)

Vaddu West is a Grama Niladhari Division (GN Division) of the Valikamam West Divisional Secretariat of Vaddukoddai, Jaffna District of Northern Province, Sri Lanka. It has Grama Niladhari Division Code J/167. This place famous to Cultural Dances & Hindu rituals.

- List of settlements in Northern Province (Sri Lanka)
