= Chankanai =

Chankanai சங்கானை චන්කානෛයි
- Town
- Location within Northern Province
- Coordinates: 9°45′0″N 79°58′0″E
- Country: Sri Lanka
- Province: Northern
- District: Jaffna
- DS Division: Valikamam West

Chankanai (Tamil: சங்கானை, romanized: Caṅkāṉai) is a town located 12 km (7.5 mi) north-west of Jaffna, Sri Lanka.

== Etymology ==
It is believed that the name Chankanai originated from its market roots. This was a famous trading place. The measurements used for rice in old era were "Changazhi", "Nazhi" and "Uzhi". The name originated from a combination of these three measuring containers.

There is a similar place name found in Kerala is known as Changanassery. Both the places are related with markets and trading places.

== History ==
There is a church from Dutch colonial rule that was built by the Portuguese and later improved by the Dutch.

The town's name was during the Dutch colonial rule known as Changane and served as the same name for the upper lever administration parish.

== Geography ==
Chankanai is surrounded by Nitchamam, Thottilady, Sandilipay, Kattudai, Sithankerny.

=== Political Division ===
Chankanai Town is administratively divided among the Grama Niladhari Divisions of Chankanai Centre, Chankanai West, Chankanai South, and Chankanai East. These divisions fall under the Divisional Secretariat of Valikamam West of Jaffna District.

=== Urban Development ===
The town of Chankanai is currently classified as a third-order city, and according to the Jaffna District Urban Development Plan 2034, it is expected to be upgraded to a second-order city. This reflects the development potential of Valikamam West.

== Health ==
Chankanai has a Peripheral Unit government hospital, called Chankanai Divisional Hospital, with 76 beds as of 2010. It is controlled by the provincial government in Jaffna and is also the only hospital in Northern Province that provides telemetry services for neurorehabilitation.
