= Vaddukoddai North =

Coordinates: 9°45′N 79°57′E

Vaddu North
- Grama Niladhari Division
- Interactive map of Vaddu North
- Country: Sri Lanka
- Province: Northern Province
- District: Jaffna
- Town: Vaddukoddai
- Time zone: UTC+5:30 (Sri Lanka Standard Time)

Vaddu North is a Grama Niladhari Division (GN Division) of the Valikamam West Divisional Secretariat of Vaddukoddai, Jaffna District of Northern Province, Sri Lanka. It has Grama Niladhari Division Code J/158.

- List of settlements in Northern Province (Sri Lanka)
