= Valikamam West =

Valikamam West வலிகாமம் மேற்கு වැලිගම බටහිර
- Divisional Secretariat
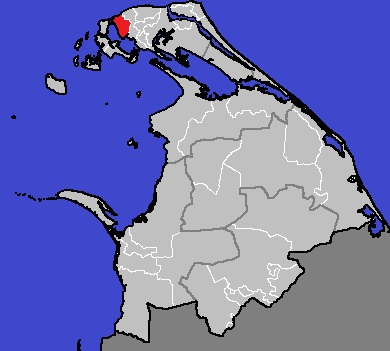
- Map of Northern Province (Sri Lanka) with Valikamam West Highlighted (Red)

- Location in Sri Lanka
- Coordinates: 9°44′N 79°57′E
- Country: Sri Lanka
- Province: Northern Province
- District: Jaffna District
- Region: Valikamam
- Founded: 19th century

Government
  - Type: Divisional Secretariat
  - Body: Valikamam West Divisional Council
  - Chairman: Shanmuganathan Jeyanthan, ITAK
  - Deputy Chairman: Vacant since 2022
  - Secretary: Shanmugarajah Balaruban

Area
  - Total: 47.3 km^{2} (18.3 sq mi)
  - Land: 25.27 km^{2} (9.76 sq mi)
- Elevation: 2 m (6.6 ft)
- Time zone: UTC+5:30 (Sri Lanka Standard Time)
- Postal codes: 40000 Jaffna
- Area code: 7324037
- Website: valikamamwest.ds.gov.lk

Valikamam West (Tamil: வலிகாமம் மேற்கு, romanized: Valikāmam mēṟku, lit. 'The west sandy village'; Sinhala: වැලිගම බටහිර, romanized: Væligama baṭahira) is a Divisional Secretariat of Jaffna District, of Northern Province, Sri Lanka.

In official government records and statistical data, the division is referred to as Chankanai, after the administrative center.

== Etymology ==
Although the modern Tamil words வலி, Vali and காமம், Kāmam can mean pain and lust respectively, the etymology of Valikamam is derived from the classical meanings of the words, as used in early Tamil inscriptions.

The name Valikamam (Tamil: வலிகாமம், romanized: Valikāmam) therefore translates to "the sandy village", whereas Tamil: மேற்கு, romanized: Mēṟku, lit. 'West' denotes the geographical marker.

It is derived from the words:

- Tamil: வலி, romanized: Vali, lit. 'Sand or sandy land'
- Tamil: காமம், romanized: Kāmam, lit. 'Village'

The word காமம், Kāmam is no longer in common use but was historically found in Eezham Tamil place names. It shares linguistic roots with Sanskrit: ग्राम, romanized: Grāma, Pali: गाम, romanized: Gāma, and Sinhala: ගම, romanized: Gama. The word has been found in early Tamil inscriptions, including an 11th-century record at Velgam Vihara, Trincomalee, and a 12th-century Chola inscription at Thiruvalangadu, where Valikamam is explicitly mentioned as a village.

The name Valikamam is also linguistically equivalent to Manaltidar or Manarridal, the ancient Tamil names for Jaffna, which carry the same meaning of "sandy land."

According to the 16th-century Tamil literary work Santiago Kumara Ammanai, Valikamam was historically referred to as well as: வல்லி கிராமம், romanized: Valli Kiraamam, lit. 'The village of the Tinospora cordifolia plant.'

== Geography ==
Valikamam West covers a total land extent of 4,730 hectares (47.3 km^{2}) with a developable area of 2,527 hectares (25.27 km^{2}). The region is bordered by:

- East – Valikamam South West Pradeshiya Sabha and Valukkaiyaru Seasonal River.
- South – Jaffna Lagoon.
- West – Jaffna Lagoon.

=== Administrative Divisions ===
The Divisional Council Valikamam West was declared as an Urban Development Area under the UDA Act No.41 of 1978, as per Gazette Notification No. 2185/74 on 24 July 2020.

Valikamam is currently further divided into Grama Niladhari divisions, which serve as fourth-level administrative units.

Grama Niladhari Divisions of Valikamam West
Biggest Town	G.N. Division	Division No	Villages
Vaddukoddai	Vaddukoddai East	J/157	Vaddukoddai East; Anthiran; Thavalai; Kulippan
Vaddukoddai	Vaddukoddai North	J/158	Kalainagar; Pilawaththai; Sivan Kovilady (Part); Vaddukoddai North
Vaddukoddai	Vaddukoddai South	J/165	Muthalikovilady; Sempaddanthodam; Koddisuddi; Inpachoolai; Kaalikovilady; Arasady
Vaddukoddai	Vaddukoddai South-West	J/166	Kaladdy; Near Jaffna College; Kirawalai; Ithiyady
Vaddukoddai	Vaddukoddai West	J/167	Sivankovilady (Part); Kanakaiamman Kovilady; Kalvil
Araly	Araly West	J/160	Koddaikaddu (Part); Nochchikadu; Pungankuli
Araly	Araly Centre	J/161	Urraththi; Kanawakkai; Kaladdymoollai; Koddaikaddu (Part); Vannarpuram; Namagal Kovilady
Araly	Araly South	J/162	Thenmoolai; Veppiyanni; Vadamoolai
Araly	Araly East	J/163	Kulainai; Veemankamam; Iyannar Kovilady
Araly	Araly North	J/164	Chettiyarmadam; Magilippulam; Nagendramadam; Madathady; Nampapulam
Chankanai	Chankanai West	J/179	Nitchamam; Nikarai
Chankanai	Chankanai Centre	J/181	Thoddilady; Near Hospital
Chankanai	Chankanai South	J/180	Mavaddy; Oodakkarai
Chankanai	Chankanai East	J/178	Chankanai East
Chulipuram	Chulipuram West	J/172	Chulipuram West; Periyapulo; Raththalady; Varuthoolai (Part); Kudakkanai (Part)
Chulipuram	Chulipuram Centre	J/173	Kudakkanai (Part); Kallaivembady; Chulipuram Centre; Varuthoolai (Part)
Chulipuram	Chulipuram East	J/174	Chulipuram East; Kaluvan; Kddupulam; Pandaveddai; Paralai
Moolai	Moolai	J/171	Moolai; Veram; Kumarappulam

=== Land Use ===
The land use of Valikamam West consists of residential areas, home gardens, agricultural land, and conservation zones as the primary components. Commercial activities are concentrated mainly in the Chankanai area.

Land Use Distribution in Valikamam West (2024)
1. Paddy (40.5%)
2. Home Garden (32.4%)
3. Residential (18.0%)
4. Water Body (2.63%)
5. Palmyrah (1.72%)
6. Marshy (1.06%)
7. Roads (1.05%)
8. Commercial (0.84%)
9. Others (0.67%)
10. Religious (0.43%)
11. Abandoned Paddy (0.32%)
12. Institutional (0.32%)
13. Vacant Land (0.08%)

Land Use Categories:

- Paddy fields cover 40.5% of the total land, forming the dominant land use.
- Home gardens constitute 32.38%, contributing to household-level agriculture.
- Residential areas make up 18%, reflecting growing urbanization.
- Water bodies (including ponds and small lakes) account for 2.63%.
- Palmyrah plantations cover 1.72%, playing a role in local industries.
- Marshy lands occupy 1.06%, providing environmental benefits.
- Roads take up 1.05%, ensuring connectivity.
- Commercial zones are relatively small, at 0.84%, mainly concentrated in Chankanai.
- Religious spaces, abandoned paddy fields, and institutional areas each hold less than 1% of the total land.

Chankanai Town is the key commercial hub of Valikamam West, with a mix of residential, institutional, and commercial land use.

=== Urban Development ===
The town of Chankanai is currently classified as a third-order city, and according to the Jaffna District Urban Development Plan 2034, it is expected to be upgraded to a second-order city. This reflects the development potential of Valikamam West.

== History ==
The current division and its borders date back to Dutch colonial rule in the 18th century, which used the historical region names with a geographic suffix marker.

Jaffna peninsula was historically divided into the three regions of Vadamarachchi, Thenmarachchi and Valikamam, which today make up three regions of the Jaffna District.

During the Dutch colonial rule, Valikamam was referred to as Walligamo. Its sub-divisions were organised as parishes and recorded as follows: Changane (Chankanai), Aralie (Araly), Battoekottemeerkoe (Vaddukkoddai), and Moelaey (Moolai). These names have endured over the centuries and are still reflected in the present-day Grama Niladhari divisions.

Under British rule, the Dutch administrative framework was largely retained but restructured into a feudal system of counties known as Korales and Ratas. This system significantly influenced the evolution of Sri Lanka's modern administrative divisions.

Following independence in the 20th century, Valikamam was incorporated into the Jaffna District under the newly reformed Sri Lankan administrative structure. Today, it remains an essential region within Northern Province, retaining its historical and cultural significance.

== Demography ==
Valikamam West had a population of 46,438 in the 2012 census. Most of the residents of the town are Sri Lankan Tamils, with the majority being Hindus and a few Christians. The main language spoken is Tamil. There were 1130 females for every 1,000 males, higher than the national average of 1063.

A total of 7,731 were under age ten. As per the religious census of 2012, Valikamam West had 93.86% Hindus, 5.85% Christians, 0.23% Buddhists, 0.03% Muslims, 0.004% following other religions.

Religious census (2012)
Religion	Percent(%)
Hindu	93.86%
Christian	5.85%
Buddhists	0.23%
Muslim	0.03%
Other	0.004%

Ethnicity (2012)	Population
Sri Lankan Tamils	46,181 (99.4%)
Indian Tamils	139 (0.29%)
Sinhala	106 (0.22%)
Sri Lankan Moors	6 (0.01%)
Other (including Burgher, Malay)	6 (0.01%)
Total	46,438 (100%)

== Government and politics ==
Each Divisional Council (Tamil: பிரதேச சபை, romanized: Piratēca capai) in Sri Lanka functions as the local government authority for public administration, infrastructure, and essential services within its division. These councils operate under the Pradeshiya Sabha Act No. 15 of 1987 and were established following Sri Lanka's 1987 administrative reforms, which replaced the former District Development Councils with the current Divisional Councils system.

=== Local Administration ===
The Valikamam West Divisional Council (VWDC) (Tamil: வலிகாமம் மேற்கு பிரதேச சபை, romanized: Valikāmam mēṟku piratēca capai) is the local authority responsible for public services in the division, including roads, sanitation, housing, libraries, and public parks.

== Transportation ==
Valikamam West has a well-developed transport infrastructure connecting it with Jaffna and the surrounding regions. The area's transport network consists of major roads, bus services, and proximity to railway connections.

=== Roads ===
The local authority is located 14.4 km from Jaffna town, and the division is served by several key roads:

- AB17 Road – connects Valikamam West with Karainagar Island, spanning a distance of 5 km.
- AB21 Road – links the region to Palaly International Airport, Kankesanthurai (KKS) Harbour, Keerimalai, and Valvettithurai, areas marked for future development.
- B437 Road – connects Vallai, Thellipalai, and Araly.
- Jaffna - Ponnalai - Point Pedro Road (AB21) – a major transport route facilitating connectivity with Northern Jaffna.

=== Public Transport ===
Bus services play a crucial role in the daily transport needs of the population. The following bus routes operate within Valikamam West:

- Routes 782, 785, 786, 740, 787 – These routes provide connectivity to Chunnakam and Chavakacheri, covering most settlements in the area.
- The Chankanai Bus Stand serves as the main transport hub for the division. However, it is located at the periphery of the administrative area, causing accessibility issues for some residents.

=== Railway ===
Although Valikamam West does not have a direct railway station, nearby railway services in Jaffna provide access to the region via the Northern Line, which connects to Colombo and other major cities.

== Economy ==
As of 2024, Valikamam West has a labor force participation rate of 70%, a dependency ratio of 30%, and an unemployment rate of 16%.

The economy of Valikamam West is primarily based on agriculture, fisheries, industry, and services. The primary sector (agriculture & fisheries) accounts for 15% of employment, the secondary sector (industry & manufacturing) constitutes 58%, and the tertiary sector (services) makes up 27%.

Economic Sectors in Valikamam West (2024)
1. Agriculture (11.0%)
2. Fisheries (4.00%)
3. Industry (58.0%)
4. Services (27.0%)

=== Agriculture ===
Agriculture is a major sector, with 54% of families (8,300 households) engaged in farming. The Valikamam West Local Authority contributes 16% of the total paddy production in the Jaffna District.

Key agricultural products include:

- Red onions
- Gingelly (sesame)
- Manioc
- Black gram
- Green gram
- Chillies
- Beetroot

The region produces 4,765 metric tons of red onions annually, accounting for 25% of Jaffna District's total onion yield. Agricultural activities rely heavily on the Valkai Aru seasonal river and the local hydro system.

=== Fisheries ===
Fishing is another important sector, employing 1,632 families (11%). The region has nine fisherman cooperative societies operating under the local authority.

Valikamam West contributes 1.8% of Jaffna District's total fish production.

=== Industry ===
The secondary sector accounts for the largest share of employment at 58%. Key industries include:

- Food & beverages
- Wood & wood-based industries
- Tailoring & garment production
- Metal & aluminum works
- Leather-based products
- Cement production
- Beauty culture
- Handicrafts
- Light engineering
- Coir-based products
- Rubber & plastic-based industries

The tertiary sector, making up 27% of the economy, includes various services, retail businesses, and pottery.

== Education ==
Valikamam West has a total of 34 provincial schools functioning under the local authority, along with one private school. However, there are no national schools in the area.

In 2022, the number of students in the region was 8,805. According to data from the Divisional Secretariat, the student-to-teacher ratio is 1:15, which aligns with national educational standards.

According to the Grama Niladhari Divisions Statistics - 2020, education facilities in Valikamam West include:

- Government or private schools with A/L classes: Valikamam West has 6 GN divisions with schools that provide G.C.E. Advanced Level (A/L) education.
- Government or private schools with O/L classes: A total of 22 GN divisions in Valikamam West have schools offering G.C.E. Ordinary Level (O/L) education.
- Kindergarten / Pre-school / Early Childhood Development Centers: The division has 24 GN divisions with facilities for early childhood education.

== Health ==
The region has seven state-run public healthcare and medical institutions, including two divisional hospitals, two primary medical care units, one Medical Officer of Health (MOH) office, and two public health clinic centers.

Located in Chankanai Town, Chankanai Divisional Hospital is a Peripheral Unit government hospital with 76 beds as of 2010. It is managed by the Northern Provincial Council in Jaffna and is the only hospital in the Northern Province that provides telemetry services for neurorehabilitation.

The public healthcare services in Valikamam West play a crucial role in ensuring medical support for the local population, providing access to both primary care and specialized treatments.

== Visitor attractions ==
Valikamam West is home to several historical and cultural sites, including ancient temples, forts, and natural landmarks.

=== Attractions include ===
- Sampil Thuray (Sampu Natha Eswaram) – A historic temple located in Sampil Thurai, under Chulipuram East
- Thiruvady Nilai – A religious site in Thiruvady Nilai, Chulipuram East
- Ponnalai Varatharaja Perumal Kovil – A Vaishnavite temple situated in Ponnalai
- Paralai Eswar Vinayagar Kovil – A prominent Ganesha temple in Paralai, Chulipuram East
- Chankanai Fort / Ancient Church – Located in Chankanai South, this site includes remnants of colonial-era architecture.
- Araly Thurai – A coastal site in Araly East
- Thunaivi Ancient Sivan Kovil – An old Shiva temple in Thunaivi, Sangarathai
- Vaddukoddai South Indian Church – A Christian church in Vaddukoddai South West
- Sangarathai Aavuronchy Stone – A historical stone monument in Sangarathai.
- Sithankeny Pond – A natural pond in Sithankeny
- Valukkai Aru – A seasonal river that plays an important role in local agriculture, located in Araly North East
- Sangamittha Bo-Tree – A sacred Buddhist site in Chulipuram East

== Notable people ==
- A. Amirthalingam (1927–1989), Sri Lankan Tamil politician and leader of the Tamil United Liberation Front (TULF), born in Pannagam.
- S. Pathmanathan (born 1940), Sri Lankan Tamil historian and current Chancellor of the University of Jaffna, born in Araly.
