= Valikamam South-West Divisional Secretariat =

- Divisional Secretariat
- Interactive map of Valikamam South-West Divisional Secretariat
- Country: Sri Lanka
- Province: Northern Province
- District: Jaffna District
- Region: Valikamam
- Time zone: UTC+5:30 (Sri Lanka Standard Time)

Valikamam South-West Divisional Secretariat is a Divisional Secretariat of Jaffna District, of Northern Province, Sri Lanka.

== Demography-Religion ==
Religion in Valikamam South-West DS Division (2012)
1. Buddhist (0.30%)
2. Hindu (75.1%)
3. Muslim (0.10%)
4. Roman Catholic (20.3%)
5. Other Christian (4.20%)
6. Other (0.00%)
