= Valikamam West Divisional Council =

Local authority in Sri Lanka

Valikamam West Divisional Council வலிகாமம் மேற்கு பிரதேச சபை

Type
- Type: Local authority

Leadership
- Chairman: Shanmuganathan Jeyanthan, ITAK since 2025
- Secretary: Shanmugarajah Balaruban
- Seats: 25

Elections
- Voting system: Mixed electoral system
- Last election: 2018 Sri Lankan local government elections

Website
- valikamamwest.ps.gov.lk

Valikamam West Divisional Council (short VWDC) or Chankanai Divisional Council (Tamil: வலிகாமம் மேற்கு பிரதேச சபை, romanized: Valikāmam Mēṟku Piratēca Capai or Tamil: சங்கானை பிரதேச செயலாளர் பிரிவு, romanized: Caṅkāṉai piratēca ceyalāḷar pirivu) is the local authority for Valikamam West DS Division in northern Sri Lanka. VWDC is responsible for providing a variety of local public services including roads, sanitation, drains, housing, libraries, public parks and recreational facilities. It has 25 members elected using a mixed electoral system, where 60% of members were elected using first-past-the-post voting and the remaining 40% through closed list proportional representation.

== History ==
In 1987 there was a major re-organisation of local government in Sri Lanka. District Development Councils were abolished and replaced by Divisional Councils (Pradeshiya Sabha or Pradesha Sabhai). The Pradeshiya Sabha Act No. 15 of 1987 was passed by Parliament on 15 April 1987 and on 1 January 1988 257 Divisional Councils started functioning. The Divisional Councils were generally commensurate with their namesake Divisional Secretary's Divisions. Valikamam West Divisional Council was established as the local authority for the Valikamam West DS Division. However, according to the pro-LTTE TamilNet, the Sri Lankan government had suspended all local government in the north and east of the country in 1983 using emergency regulations. The civil war prevented elections from being held for VWDC until 1998 as the LTTE did not hold elections when it controlled the area.

In March 1994 elections were held in the east and in Vavuniya in the north. However, elections weren't held in other areas of the north, including the Jaffna Peninsula, because most of these areas were at that time controlled by the rebel Tamil Tigers. In August 1995 the Sri Lankan military launched an offensive to recapture the Jaffna Peninsula. By December 1995 the military had captured most of the Valikamam region of the peninsula, including the city of Jaffna. By 16 May 1996 the military had recaptured the entire peninsula. In late 1996 the government announced elections would be held for 23 local authorities in Jaffna District, Kilinochchi District, Mannar District and Vavuniya District but following opposition from Tamil political parties postponed them. On 3 December 1997 the government announced that elections would be held for the 17 local authorities on the Jaffna Peninsula. The Tamil political parties were still opposed to holding elections as "normalcy" hadn't returned to the peninsula. The peninsula was under the firm grip of the Sri Lankan military and civil government had little, if any, role in the administration of the peninsula. The Tamil Tigers were also firmly against the elections being held. Despite these objections the elections were held on 29 January 1998.

== Election results ==
=== 1998 local government election ===
Results of the local government election held on 29 January 1998:

Party	Votes	%	Seats
Eelam People's Democratic Party (EPDP)	3,146	49.74	8
Democratic People's Liberation Front (PLOTE)	2,358	37.28	4
Tamil Eelam Liberation Organization (TELO)	494	7.81	1
Eelam People's Revolutionary Liberation Front (EPRLF)	327	5.17	1
Valid ballots	6,325	100.0	14
Rejected ballots	1,307		
Total polled	7,632		
Electorate	37,746		
Turnout	20.22%		
Source: TamilNet

On 1 January 2002 local authority elections were called for the entire country. It was later announced that elections would be held on 25 March 2002 in the north and east, and on 20 March 2002 in the rest of the country. The normal life term of Sri Lankan local government bodies is four years. The life term of VWDC expired in February 2002 but the central government extended this by another year, as the law allows. On 21 March 2002 the Election Commissioner announced that the elections in the north and east, except for eight local authorities in Ampara District, had been postponed until 25 September 2002. On 17 September 2002 elections in the north and east were postponed, for a second time, until 25 June 2003. Elections should have been held when the extension expired in February 2003 but in January 2003, following a request from the Tamil National Alliance, the central government instead dissolved VWDC using emergency powers and instead put in place special commissioners to administer the local area. In June 2003 elections in the north and east were postponed, for a third time, until 24 January 2004. In January 2004 elections in the north and east, except for local authorities in Ampara District, were postponed, for a fourth time, until 23 October 2004.

On 27 January 2006 local authority elections were called for the entire country. It was later announced that elections would be held on 30 March 2006 across the entire country. The Election Commissioner subsequently postponed the elections in the north and Batticaloa District until 30 September 2006. On 23 September 2006 elections in the north and Batticaloa District were postponed until 30 June 2007.

VWDC continued to be administered by special commissioners until the 2011 elections.

=== 2011 local government election ===
Results of the local government election held on 23 July 2011:

Party	Votes	%	Seats
Tamil National Alliance (TNA)	12,117	77.78	11
United People's Freedom Alliance (UPFA)	3,041	19.52	3
United National Party (UNP)	420	2.70	0
Valid ballots	15,578	100.0	14
Rejected ballots	2,058		
Total polled	17,636		
Electorate	30,214		
Turnout	58.37%		
Source: Department of Elections, Sri Lanka

The following candidates were elected: Inkaran Nagaranjini (TNA), 5,008 preference votes (pv); Navaratnam Sivaranjan (TNA), 3,103 pv; Tharmalingam Nadanenthiran (TNA), 2,586 pv; Veerasingam Sivakumar (TNA), 2,180 pv; Saravanamuthu Kanagarasan (TNA), 1,818 pv; Kanthaijah Iyalinkam (TNA), 1,747 pv; Ponnusamy Kankeyanathan (TNA), 1,660 pv; Thampirasa Sasitharan (TNA), 1,113 pv; Nadarasa Francis Rajakumar (TNA), 1,103 pv; Ganesaratnam Sabanayakam (TNA), 1,036 pv; Sanmugampillai Rasathurai (TNA), 835 pv; Sivaguru Balakirushnan (UPFA), 808 pv; Selvarasa Siritharan (UPFA), 666 pv; and Sellamuthu Selvakumar (UPFA), 592 pv.

Inkaran Nagaranjini (TNA) and Navaratnam Sivaranjan (TNA) were appointed Chairman and Deputy Chairman respectively.

=== 2018 local government election ===
Results of the local government election held on 10 February 2018:

Party	Votes	%	Seats
Illankai Tamil Arasu Kachchi (ITAK)	8,119	34.44	9
All Ceylon Tamil Congress (ACTC)	5,638	23.91	6
Eelam People's Democratic Party (EPDP)	3,511	14.89	4
United National Party (UNP)	3,109	13.19	3
Independent Group	1,408	5.97	2
Sri Lanka Freedom Party (SLFP)	1,279	5.42	1
Tamil United Liberation Front (TULF)	224	0.95	0
Sri Lanka Podujana Peramuna (SLPP)	198	0.84	0
People's Liberation Front (JVP)	91	0.39	0
Valid ballots	23,577	100.0	25
Invalid ballots	506	2.1	
Total polled	24,083	70.24	
Electorate	34,292		
Source: Department of Elections, Sri Lanka

Valikamam West Pradeshiya Sabha Election 2018
Total 25 seats
- Illankai Tamil Arasu Kachchi: 9
- All Ceylon Tamil Congress: 6
- Eelam People's Democratic Party: 4
- United National Party: 3
- Independent Group: 2
- Sri Lanka Freedom Party: 1

This was also the first election under the mixed electoral system where 60% of members were elected using first-past-the-post voting and the remaining 40% through closed list proportional representation.

=== 2025 local government election ===
Results of the 2025 local government election held on 6 May 2025:

Party	Votes	%	Seats
Ilankai Tamil Arasu Kachchi (ITAK)	7,364	34.78	10
All Ceylon Tamil Congress (ACTC)	4,982	23.53	6
Democratic Tamil National Alliance (DTNA)	2,026	9.57	2
Eelam People's Democratic Party (EPDP)	1,386	6.55	2
United National Party (UNP)	809	3.82	1
Independent Group	702	3.32	1
Valid ballots	21,175	97.67	22
Rejected ballots	506	2.33	—
Total polled	21,681	55.94	—
Electorate	38,756	—	—
Summary data from the Election Commission website

Valikamam West Pradeshiya Sabha Election 2025
Total 22 seats
- Ilankai Tamil Arasu Kachchi: 10
- All Ceylon Tamil Congress: 6
- Democratic Tamil National Alliance: 2
- Eelam People's Democratic Party: 2
- United National Party: 1
- Independent Group: 1

This election follows Sri Lanka’s mixed-member proportional representation model, allocating 60% of seats through first‑past‑the‑post and the remaining 40% proportionally.

=== Election context ===
These elections were part of the nationwide polls held on 6 May 2025, returning 8,793 councillors across 339 local authorities. Postal voting took place between 24 – 29 April, and the new term officially began on 2 June following the issuance of the gazette.
