= Vaddukoddai Hindu College =

National School in Vaddukoddai, Sri Lanka

J/ Vaddukoddai Hindu College
- யா/ வட்டுக்கோட்டை இந்துக் கல்லூரி

Location
- Vallai-Tellippalai-Araly Road; Sithankerny, Jaffna District, Northern Province; Sri Lanka; 9°44′50.50″N 79°57′27.20″E

Information
- School type: Public National 1AB
- Founded: 9 October 1894; 131 years ago
- Founder: Ambalavana Navalar
- School district: Valikamam Education Zone
- Authority: Northern Provincial Council
- School number: 1011001
- Teaching staff: 50
- Grades: 6-13
- Gender: Mixed
- Age range: 11-19
- Slogan: பிச்சை எடுத்தும் கற்பண கல்
- Sports: Cricket, Volleyball, Tennis, Basketball
- Nickname: NAVODAYA

J/ Vaddukoddai Hindu College (Tamil: யா/ வட்டுக்கோட்டை இந்துக் கல்லூரி, romanized: Ja/ Vaṭṭukkōṭṭai Intuk Kallūri, also known as Vaddu Hindu College & VHC) is a National School in (near Sithankerny) Vaddukoddai, Sri Lanka.

Vaddukoddai Hindu College was started as an English school by Ambalavana Navalar on Vijayadashami in the month of 1894 (09.10.1894). against Vaddukoddai Seminary (Jaffna College) in order to prevent this process of "Saiva Tamil" children converting to Christianity for learning English and get government jobs.

== History ==
While Sri Lanka was subjugated under British rule, Saivism and Tamil were systematically suppressed and Christianity and English were spread, Arumuka Navalar appeared in Jaffna and started working against Christianity to protect Saivism and Tamil. The Navalar expanded his activities against Christianity by joining Hindu activists and religious leaders. It was in this situation that Ambalavana Navalar from Sithankerny joined Arumuka Navalar and got his blessings and started doing his work as a disciple of Arumuka Navalar.

During this period, Christians called Missionary formed the present day Jaffna College under the name of "Vaddukoddai Seminary" as a university equivalent to a university with all facilities in South Asia. It taught education through English medium. Those who graduated here were called Seminari Graduates.

At that time, getting a government job was only given to those who had knowledge of the English language.

In order to acquire knowledge of the English language, one had to join the Vaddukoddai seminary. In those days, if you want to study together here, you have to convert to Christianity. If government jobs were required, Saiva children were required to convert to Christianity and join Vaddukoddai Seminary to acquire knowledge of English language. Many people became Christians because of this.

Thus Vaddukoddai Hindu College was started as an English school by Ambalavana Navalar on Vijayadasami in the month of 1894 (09.10.1894) against Vaddukoddai Seminary in order to stop this process of Saiva Tamils converting to Christianity and acquiring knowledge of English and poor Saiva Tamils without converting to get English language education and get government jobs.

== See also ==
- List of schools in Northern Province, Sri Lanka
- VHC - Old Students Association vhcosa.com
