= Valikamam North Divisional Council =

Local public services council in northern Sri Lanka

Valikamam North Divisional Council வலிகாமம் வடக்கு பிரதேச சபை

Type
- Type: Local authority

Leadership
- Chairman: Somasuntharam Sugirthan, TNA since July 2011
- Deputy Chairman: Sanmugalinkam Sajeevan, TNA since July 2011
- Seats: 21

Elections
- Last election: 2011 Sri Lankan local government elections

Valikamam North Divisional Council (Tamil: வலிகாமம் வடக்கு பிரதேச சபை Valikāmam Vaṭakku Piratēca Capai; VNDC) is the local authority for Valikamam North DS Division in northern Sri Lanka. VNDC is responsible for providing a variety of local public services including roads, sanitation, drains, housing, libraries, public parks and recreational facilities. It has 21 members elected using the open list proportional representation system.

== History ==
In 1987 there was a major re-organisation of local government in Sri Lanka. District Development Councils were abolished and replaced by Divisional Councils (Pradeshiya Sabha or Pradesha Sabhai). The Pradeshiya Sabha Act No. 15 of 1987 was passed by Parliament on 15 April 1987 and on 1 January 1988 257 Divisional Councils started functioning. The Divisional Councils were generally commensurate with their namesake Divisional Secretary's Divisions. Valikamam North Divisional Council was established as the local authority for the Valikamam North DS Division. However, according to the pro-LTTE TamilNet, the Sri Lankan government had suspended all local government in the north and east of the country in 1983 using emergency regulations. The civil war prevented elections from being held for VNDC until 1998 as the LTTE did not hold elections when it controlled the area.

In March 1994 elections were held in the east and in Vavuniya in the north. However, elections weren't held in other areas of the north, including the Jaffna Peninsula, because most of these areas were at that time controlled by the rebel Tamil Tigers. In August 1995 the Sri Lankan military launched an offensive to recapture the Jaffna Peninsula. By December 1995 the military had captured most of the Valikamam region of the peninsula, including the city of Jaffna. By 16 May 1996 the military had recaptured the entire peninsula. In late 1996 the government announced elections would be held for 23 local authorities in Jaffna District, Kilinochchi District, Mannar District and Vavuniya District but following opposition from Tamil political parties postponed them. On 3 December 1997 the government announced that elections would be held for the 17 local authorities on the Jaffna Peninsula. The Tamil political parties were still opposed to holding elections as "normalcy" hadn't returned to the peninsula. The peninsula was under the firm grip of the Sri Lankan military and civil government had little, if any, role in the administration of the peninsula. The Tamil Tigers were also firmly against the elections being held. Despite these objections the elections were held on 29 January 1998.

== Election results ==
=== 1998 local government election ===
Results of the local government election held on 29 January 1998:

| Alliances and parties | Votes | % | Seats |
|---|---|---|---|
| Tamil United Liberation Front | 2,821 | 46.19% | 11 |
| Eelam People's Democratic Party | 1,799 | 29.45% | 6 |
| Eelam People's Revolutionary Liberation Front | 816 | 13.36% | 2 |
| Democratic People's Liberation Front (PLOTE) | 528 | 8.64% | 2 |
| Tamil Eelam Liberation Organization | 144 | 2.36% | 0 |
| Valid Votes | 6,108 | 100.00% | 21 |
| Rejected Votes | 469 | | |
| Total Polled | 6,577 | | |
| Registered Electors | 53,697 | | |
| Turnout | 12.25% | | |

On 1 January 2002 local authority elections were called for the entire country. It was later announced that elections would be held on 25 March 2002 in the north and east, and on 20 March 2002 in the rest of the country. The normal life term of Sri Lankan local government bodies is four years. The life term of VNDC expired in February 2002 but the central government extended this by another year, as the law allows. On 21 March 2002 the Election Commissioner announced that the elections in the north and east, except for eight local authorities in Ampara District, had been postponed until 25 September 2002. On 17 September 2002 elections in the north and east were postponed, for a second time, until 25 June 2003. Elections should have been held when the extension expired in February 2003 but in January 2003, following a request from the Tamil National Alliance, the central government instead dissolved VNDC using emergency powers and instead put in place special commissioners to administer the local area. In June 2003 elections in the north and east were postponed, for a third time, until 24 January 2004. In January 2004 elections in the north and east, except for local authorities in Ampara District, were postponed, for a fourth time, until 23 October 2004.

On 27 January 2006 local authority elections were called for the entire country. It was later announced that elections would be held on 30 March 2006 across the entire country. The Election Commissioner subsequently postponed the elections in the north and Batticaloa District until 30 September 2006. On 23 September 2006 elections in the north and Batticaloa District were postponed until 30 June 2007.

VNDC continued to be administered by special commissioners until the 2011 elections.

=== 2011 local government election ===
Results of the local government election held on 23 July 2011:

| Alliances and parties | Votes | % | Seats |
|---|---|---|---|
| Tamil National Alliance (EPRLF (S), ITAK, PLOTE, TELO, TULF) | 12,065 | 70.71% | 15 |
| United People's Freedom Alliance (EPDP, SLFP et al.) | 4,919 | 28.83% | 6 |
| United National Party | 78 | 0.46% | 0 |
| Valid Votes | 17,062 | 100.00% | 21 |
| Rejected Votes | 1,643 | | |
| Total Polled | 18,705 | | |
| Registered Electors | 63,224 | | |
| Turnout | 29.59% | | |

The following candidates were elected: Somasuntharam Sugirthan (TNA), 3,238 preference votes (pv); Sanmugalinkam Sajeevan (TNA), 2,565 pv; Annaparipooranam Gnaneswaran (TNA), 2,447 pv; Sellathurai Selvarajah (TNA), 1,655 pv; Ponnuthurai Thangarasa (TNA), 1,459 pv; Nadaraja Mathialakarasa (TNA), 1,284 pv; Kanthasamy Maurathan (TNA), 1,258 pv; Rasaratnam Jeyabalasingam (UPFA), 1,253 pv; Velumailum Sanmuganathan (TNA), 1,186 pv; Sellathurai Kamalanathan (TNA), 1,172 pv; Thampipillai Nadarajah (TNA), 1,157 pv; Marimuthu Kathiramalaipillai (TNA), 1,116 pv; Sellappah Thirugnanam (UPFA), 993 pv; Sivapalasuntharam Harikaran (TNA), 981 pv; Sanai Thangarasa (TNA), 974 pv; Mailvakanam Sivakumaran (TNA), 880 pv; Vairavan Murugesu (TNA), 820 pv; Pasupathy Uthayakumar (UPFA), 800 pv; Subramaniyam Manirasa (UPFA), 798 pv; Pasupathy Mathanaraj (UPFA), 627 pv; and Murugan Iyathurai (UPFA), 535 pv.

Somasuntharam Sugirthan (TNA) and Sanmugalinkam Sajeevan (TNA) were appointed Chairman and Deputy Chairman respectively.
