= Vaddukoddai East =

Coordinates: 9°44′N 79°57′E

Vaddu East
- Grama Niladhari Division
- Interactive map of Vaddu East
- Country: Sri Lanka
- Province: Northern Province
- District: Jaffna
- Town: Vaddukoddai
- Time zone: UTC+5:30 (Sri Lanka Standard Time)

Vaddu East is a Grama Niladhari Division (GN Division) of the Valikamam West Divisional Secretariat of Vaddukoddai, Jaffna District of Northern Province, Sri Lanka. It has Grama Niladhari Division Code J/157.

- List of settlements in Northern Province (Sri Lanka)

== See also ==
- List of towns in Northern Province, Sri Lanka
