= Sandilipay =

Coordinates: 9°45′N 79°59′E

Sandilipay is a town located 10 km from the City of Jaffna, Sri Lanka. It is the home of :

- Kalvalai Pillaiyar Temple (renowned for its poetic work Kalvalai Anthathi, written by Sinnathamby Pulavar)
- Seerani Nagapoosani Amman Temple
- Jaffna's one and only river, Valukkai aaru.
- Sri kaaliampal temple (poovarasi, 'poovarasil poothavalea' music album)
