= Piranpattu =

Village in Sri Lanka

Piranpattu பிரான்பற்று
- Village
- Location within Northern Province
- Coordinates: 9°46′23″N 79°58′03″E
- Country: Sri Lanka
- Province: Northern
- District: Jaffna
- DS Division: Valikamam South-West

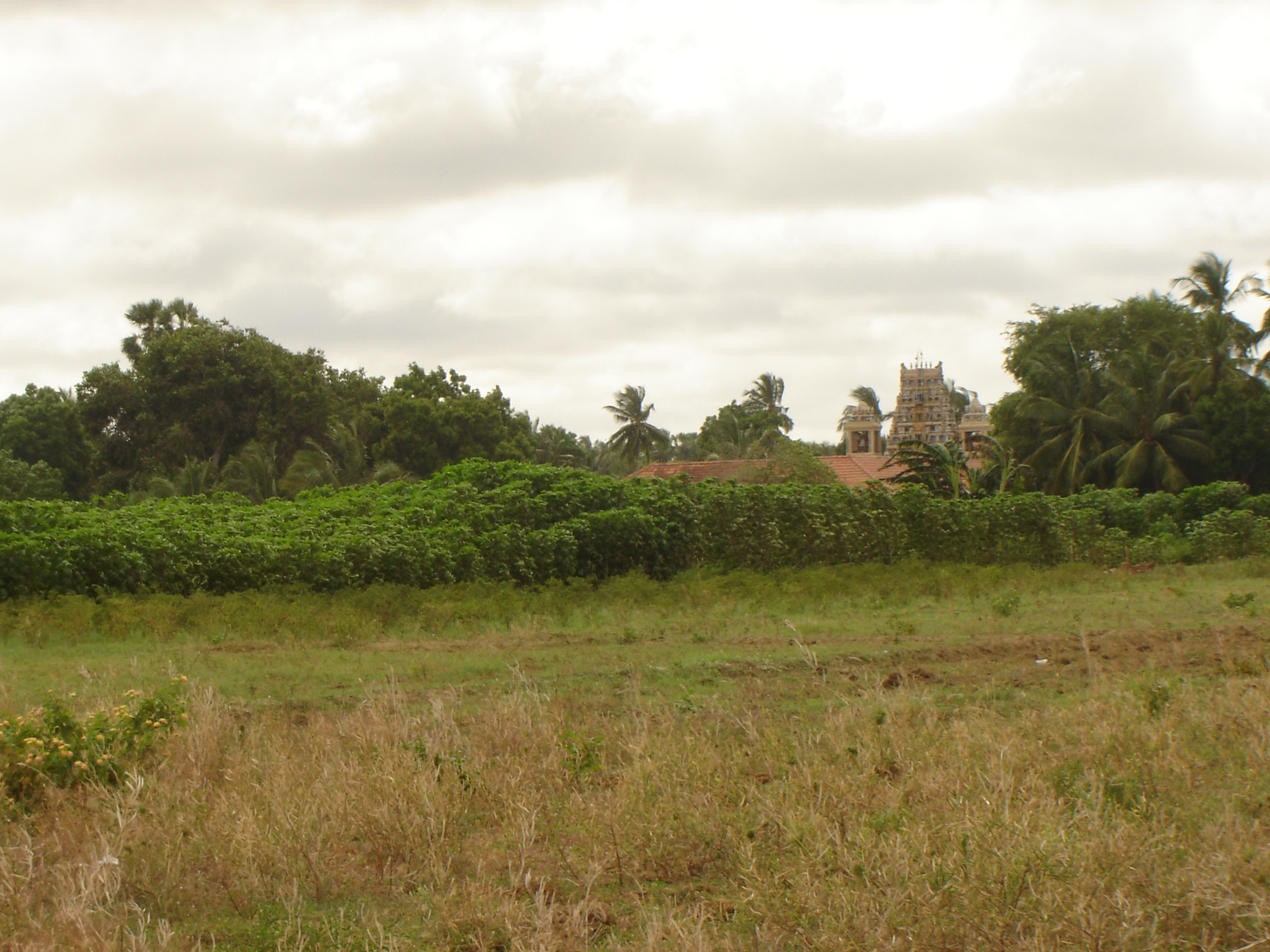
Periyavalavu Murugan Temple

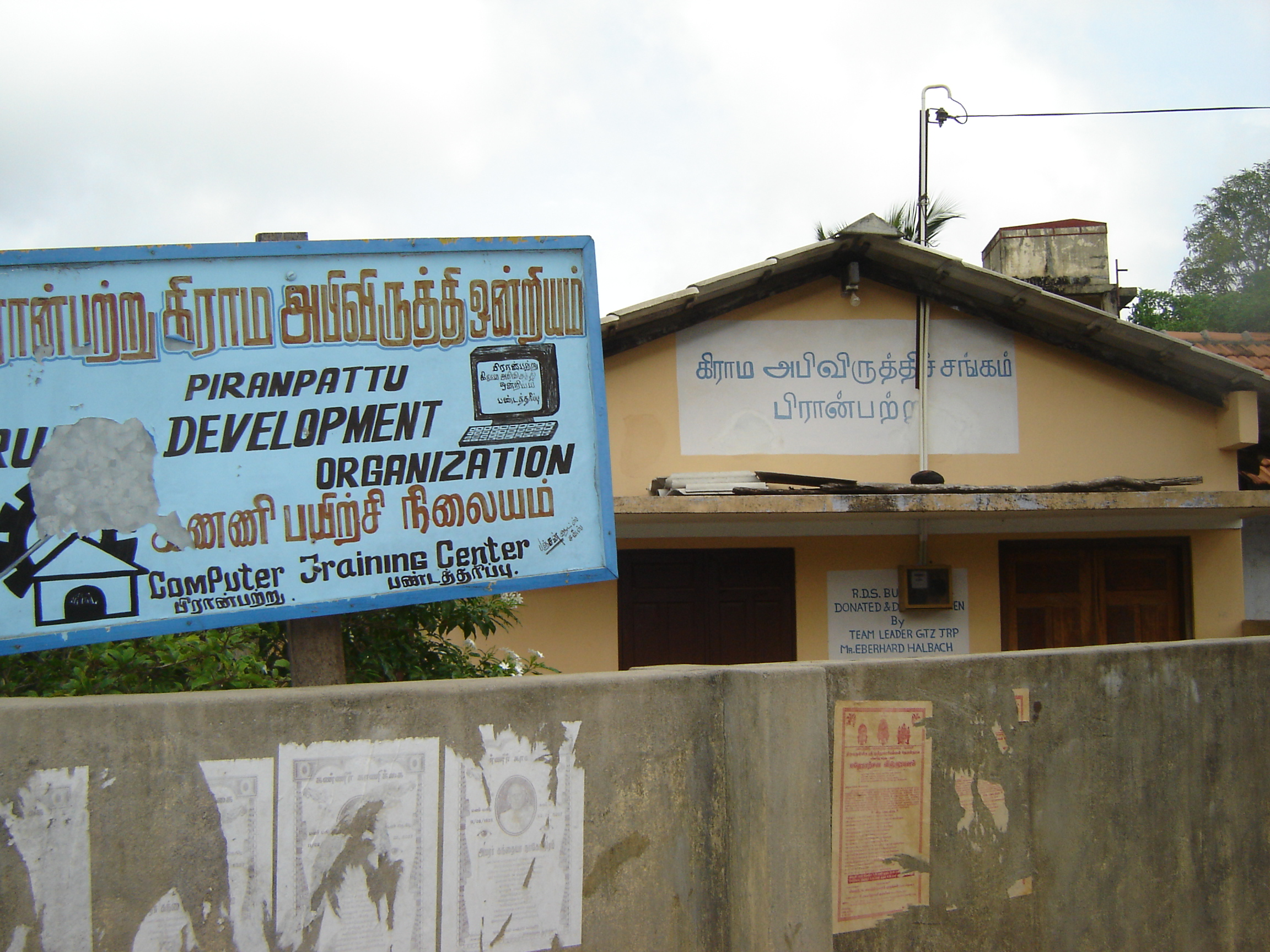
Rural Development Organisation

Piranpattu (Tamil: பிரான்பற்று) is a village in the northern Jaffna District, Sri Lanka.

== Etymology ==
Piranpattu is the term which derived from term Pirampaththai (Tamil: பிராம்பத்தை). The origin of the term Pirampaththai stems from an abundance of Piraya trees 50 years ago in the village. So, people name the town with the name of Piraya tree combined with Patthai, a type of grass. So, Pirampaththai came about; but around 30 years ago it was changed to Piranpattu as some didn't like to call it Pirampaththai. So, they changed the name; however other village people still call it Pirampaththai.

== History ==
Piranpattu is very famous for Gingely oil. It was the major occupation for those people who are from Piranpattu. But this trend changed after the Civil war. Many people started to leave the village. Some people went to Colombo which is the capital of Sri Lanka. There are over 500 families in the village at the moment but there are number of people from the village living in Europe and North America - they have gone abroad because of civil war as well as employment reasons. There are more than thousand of people live in abroad. But still Some people do Gingely oil production. Others are farmers, Government and private sector employees.

== Religion & Temples ==
There are more than 99% of the people are Hindus. Only 1% of the people are Christians. There are a number of temples in Piranpattu. Two of temples are very big and famous. Piranpattu Periyavalavu Murugamoorthy temple and Piranpattu Alampathi Sri Muththumari Ampal temple (பிரான்பற்று பெரியவளவு முருகமூர்த்தி ஆலயம், பிரான்பற்று ஆலம்பதி ஸ்ரீ முத்துமாரியம்மன் தேவஸ்தானம்). There is another famous temple called Puliyadi Amman (புளியடி அம்மன்).

There are lot of Vairavar temples which are Sooriya Vairavar, Mullaiyadi Vairavar, Gnana Vairavar, Linga Vairavar, Iluppadi Vairavar and Sudalai Vairavar. There is also a Veerapaththirar temple and a Pechchiyamman temple.

== Health care ==
Piranpattu is situated near to Pandateruppu and Changanai. So there are two main hospitals near to Pirapattu. People go to changanai Hospital or Pandateruppu Kaadappulam Hospital to get medicine for their illness. There are two health care centres (hospitals)in the Village: one is Piranpattu Primary Health Care Centre and the other one is Piranpattu Ayurveda Hospital. This Piranpattu Ayurveda Hospital is changed as Pandateruppu Ayurveda Hospital and the place also transferred from Piranpattu to Pandateruppu town area. Piranpattu is situated 16 km from Jaffna Town Hospital. If any emergency problem people directly go to Jaffna Main Hospital.

== Organizations ==
There are two major organizations in The Village. They are Piranpattu Rural Development Organization and Piranpattu Rural Development Association. Piranpattu Rural Development Organization has introduced some technical courses for the village people free of charge: computer training, sweep, wiring etc. with the help of Department of Education. It's very helpful for village people. There are many people unable to pay for their job oriented courses like as mentioned earlier. Some batches have finished the computer courses.

== Education ==
There is a free nursery called Sri Murugan Mun Palli. There is a school called as J/Piranpattu Kalaimahal Vidyalayam. It includes from grade 1 up to Grade 11. Earlier, the school had up to 9th Grade. But before few years it increased the grades up to 11. Unfortunately the school does not have all the facilities and there is not a proper Old Students Union. Even if they have Old Students Union, they don't have fund to do any development or functions. There are many people studying at the Kalaimhal Vidyalayam. Many Other pupil go to Sandilipay Hindu College, Pandateruppu Girls High College, Pandateruppu Hindu College, etc... Many Students follow their G.C.E advanced level education at Town schools and above mentioned Schools. There are some got the chance to Study at Universities and College of Education. The Village Has Engineers, Doctors, teachers and other important positions of people.

== Sports ==
Sports are a major hobby for the youth. There is a big ground for the people which was provided by people abroad. Youth are reported to like to play Cricket, Football and Kilithaddu (Which is one of the Tamils' traditional sports).

== Other Facilities ==
 There is a Samurthy Bank Union which serves other villages too. There are three community centres. There is a sub-Post office for Village people.
