= Valikamam East Divisional Secretariat =

Valikamam East
- Divisional Secretariat
- Country: Sri Lanka
- Province: Northern Province
- District: Jaffna District
- Region: Valikamam
- Time zone: UTC+5:30 (Sri Lanka Standard Time)

Valikamam East is a Divisional Secretariat of Jaffna District, of Northern Province, Sri Lanka.

== Demography-Religion ==
Religion in Valikamam East DS Division (2012)
1. Buddhist (0.20%)
2. Hindu (90.9%)
3. Muslim (0.20%)
4. Roman Catholic (5.60%)
5. Other Christian (3.10%)
6. Other (0.00%)
