= Valikamam North Divisional Secretariat =

Valikamam North
- Divisional Secretariat
- Interactive map of Valikamam North
- Country: Sri Lanka
- Province: Northern Province
- District: Jaffna District
- Region: Valikamam
- Time zone: UTC+5:30 (Sri Lanka Standard Time)

Valikamam North is a Divisional Secretariat of Jaffna District, of Northern Province, Sri Lanka.

== Demography-Religion ==
Religion in Valikamam North DS Division (2012)
1. Buddhist (1.50%)
2. Hindu (85.8%)
3. Muslim (0.10%)
4. Roman Catholic (9.70%)
5. Other Christian (2.90%)
6. Other (0.00%)
