= Moolai =

Moolai மூளாய் මූලය
- Town
- Location within Northern Province
- Coordinates: 9°45′0.12″N 79°55′58.69″E
- Country: Sri Lanka
- Province: Northern
- District: Jaffna
- DS Division: Valikamam West

Moolai (Tamil: மூளாய் Moolaai) is a town in Northern Jaffna District, Sri Lanka. It is located 12 km (7 mi) North West from the city of Jaffna.

== Moolai Temples (மூளாய் கோவில்கள்) ==
- Vathiranpulo Siththivinayagar temple (வதிரன்புலோ சித்திவிநாயகர் தேவஸ்தானம்)
- Vathiranpulo Mutthukumaraswamy temple (வதிரன்புலோ முத்துக்குமாரசுவாமி தேவஸ்தானம்)
- Potpulampathy Maha Kaliambaal temple and Vairavar temple (பொற்புலம்பதி மஹா காளியம்பாள் கோவிலும் வைரவர் கோவிலும்)
- Harihara Puththi Ayanaar temple (ஹரிஹர புத்தி ஐயனார் தேவஸ்தானம்)

== Moolai Schools (மூளாய் பாடசாலைகள்) ==
Gat1	Admin District	Zone	Div	School	Address	Medium	Sex	Grades	Type	Roll
Pro	JAF	JAF	Chankanai	Moolai A.M.T.M.S	Moolai	Tamil	Mixed	1-5	1AB	254
Pro	JAF	JAF	Chankanai	Saivapragasa Vidyalayam சைவப்பிரகாச வித்தியாலயம்	Moolai	Tamil	Mixed	1-11	2	452
Pro	JAF	JAF	Chankanai	YMHA Moolai Elementary School மூளாய் இந்து இளைஞர் மன்றம், முன்பள்ளி	Moolai	Tamil	Mixed	Kindergarten		60
Pro	JAF	JAF	Chankanai	Gnanaoli Araneri School ஞானஒளி அறநெறி பாடசாலை	Moolai	Tamil	Mixed	Kindergarten		60

== See also ==
- Village website http://moolai.org
- Moolai Cooperative Hospital
