= Vaddukoddai Polling Division =

Vaddukoddai
- Polling Division
- Coordinates: 9.734426°N 79.939364°E
- Country: Sri Lanka
- Province: Northern Province, Sri Lanka
- Electoral District: Jaffna Electoral District

Area
  - Total: 52.88 km^{2} (20.42 sq mi)

Population (2012)
  - Total: 46,438
  - Density: 878/km^{2} (2,270/sq mi)
- ISO 3166 code: EC-10B

The Vaddukoddai Polling Division is a Polling Division in the Jaffna Electoral District, in the Northern Province, Sri Lanka.

== Presidential Election Results ==
=== Summary ===
The winner of Vaddukoddai has matched the final country result 3 out of 8 times.

Year	Vaddukoddai	Jaffna Electoral District	MAE %	Sri Lanka	MAE %
2019	NDF	NDF	1.25%	SLPP	41.55%
2015	NDF	NDF	4.50%	NDF	19.67%
2010	NDF	NDF	1.28%	UPFA	29.41%
2005	UNP	UNP	2.95%	UPFA	26.88%
1999	PA	PA	7.58%	PA	5.58%
1994	PA	PA	3.98%	PA	31.26%
1988	SLFP	SLFP	2.53%	UNP	15.22%
1982	ACTC	ACTC	2.50%	UNP	21.89%
Matches/Mean MAE	3/8	3/8	3.32%	8/8	23.93%

=== 2019 Sri Lankan Presidential Election ===
Party	Vaddukoddai		Jaffna Electoral District		Sri Lanka	
Party	Votes	%	Votes	%	Votes	%
NDF	26,238	82.44%	312,722	83.86%	5,564,239	41.99%
Other Parties (with < 1%)	2,538	7.97%	23,295	6.25%	717,212	5.41%
SLPP	1,728	5.43%	23,261	6.24%	6,924,255	52.25%
IND10	727	2.28%	6,845	1.84%	12,256	0.09%
DUNF	594	1.87%	6,790	1.82%	34,537	0.26%
Valid Votes	31,825	96.19%	372,913	97.07%	13,252,499	98.99%
Rejected Votes	1,259	3.81%	11,251	2.93%	135,452	1.01%
Total Polled	33,084	69.13%	384,164	68.00%	13,387,951	83.71%
Registered Electors	47,856		564,984		15,992,568	

=== 2015 Sri Lankan Presidential Election ===
Party	Vaddukoddai		Jaffna Electoral District		Sri Lanka	
Party	Votes	%	Votes	%	Votes	%
NDF	20,873	69.58%	253,574	74.42%	6,217,162	51.28%
UPFA	7,791	25.97%	74,454	21.85%	5,768,090	47.58%
Other Parties (with < 1%)	1,333	4.44%	12,723	3.73%	138,200	1.14%
Valid Votes	29,997	96.64%	340,751	97.14%	12,123,452	98.85%
Rejected Votes	1,043	3.36%	10,038	2.86%	140,925	1.15%
Total Polled	31,040	65.18%	350,789	64.22%	12,264,377	78.69%
Registered Electors	47,621		546,265		15,585,942	

=== 2010 Sri Lankan Presidential Election ===
Party	Vaddukoddai		Jaffna Electoral District		Sri Lanka	
Party	Votes	%	Votes	%	Votes	%
NDF	11,712	62.68%	113,877	63.84%	4,173,185	40.15%
UPFA	4,247	22.73%	44,154	24.75%	6,015,934	57.88%
Other Parties (with < 1%)	1,413	7.56%	10,438	5.85%	132,316	1.27%
Ind 5	500	2.68%	3,205	1.80%	9,662	0.09%
UDF	486	2.60%	3,325	1.86%	23,290	0.22%
DUNF	326	1.74%	3,370	1.89%	39,226	0.38%
Valid Votes	18,684	96.13%	178,369	96.35%	10,393,613	99.03%
Rejected Votes	752	3.87%	6,763	3.65%	101,838	0.97%
Total Polled	19,436	30.37%	185,132	25.15%	10,495,451	66.70%
Registered Electors	63,991		736,032		15,734,587	

=== 2005 Sri Lankan Presidential Election ===
Party	Vaddukoddai		Jaffna Electoral District		Sri Lanka	
Party	Votes	%	Votes	%	Votes	%
UNP	191	72.62%	5,523	70.20%	4,706,366	48.43%
UPFA	53	20.15%	1,967	25.00%	4,887,152	50.29%
Other Parties (with < 1%)	7	2.66%	244	3.10%	46,648	0.48%
USP	3	1.14%	72	0.92%	35,425	0.36%
JSP	3	1.14%	34	0.43%	31,238	0.32%
SLPF	3	1.14%	16	0.20%	2,525	0.03%
RPP	3	1.14%	12	0.15%	7,685	0.08%
Valid Votes	263	94.60%	7,868	92.30%	9,717,039	98.88%
Rejected Votes	15	5.40%	656	7.70%	109,869	1.12%
Total Polled	278	0.44%	8,524	1.20%	9,826,908	69.51%
Registered Electors	62,781		707,970		14,136,979	

=== 1999 Sri Lankan Presidential Election ===
Party	Vaddukoddai		Jaffna Electoral District		Sri Lanka	
Party	Votes	%	Votes	%	Votes	%
PA	6,854	53.71%	52,043	46.65%	4,312,157	51.12%
UNP	4,232	33.17%	48,005	43.03%	3,602,748	42.71%
Other Parties (with < 1%)	551	4.32%	4,070	3.65%	408,947	4.85%
LDA	466	3.65%	3,394	3.04%	23,668	0.28%
Ind 2	293	2.30%	1,873	1.68%	27,052	0.32%
Liberal	228	1.79%	1,368	1.23%	25,085	0.30%
SMBP	139	1.09%	818	0.73%	35,854	0.43%
Valid Votes	12,760	94.33%	111,568	94.91%	8,435,754	97.69%
Rejected Votes	767	5.67%	5,981	5.09%	199,536	2.31%
Total Polled	13,527	23.18%	117,549	19.15%	8,635,290	72.17%
Registered Electors	58,350		613,718		11,965,536	

=== 1994 Sri Lankan Presidential Election ===
Party	Vaddukoddai		Jaffna Electoral District		Sri Lanka	
Party	Votes	%	Votes	%	Votes	%
PA	539	92.29%	16,934	96.35%	4,709,205	62.28%
Ind 2	31	5.31%	341	1.94%	58,888	0.78%
UNP	6	1.03%	223	1.27%	2,715,283	35.91%
SMBP	6	1.03%	36	0.20%	32,651	0.43%
Other Parties (with < 1%)	2	0.34%	41	0.23%	45,501	0.60%
Valid Votes	584	99.32%	17,575	99.20%	7,561,526	98.03%
Rejected Votes	4	0.68%	141	0.80%	151,706	1.97%
Total Polled	588	1.00%	17,716	2.97%	7,713,232	69.12%
Registered Electors	58,949		596,422		11,158,880	

=== 1988 Sri Lankan Presidential Election ===
Party	Vaddukoddai		Jaffna Electoral District		Sri Lanka	
Party	Votes	%	Votes	%	Votes	%
SLFP	6,495	40.45%	44,197	36.82%	2,289,857	44.95%
SLMP	5,252	32.71%	42,198	35.15%	235,701	4.63%
UNP	4,309	26.84%	33,650	28.03%	2,569,199	50.43%
Valid Votes	16,056	87.01%	120,045	93.38%	5,094,754	98.24%
Rejected Votes	2,397	12.99%	8,517	6.62%	91,499	1.76%
Total Polled	18,453	100.00%	128,562	23.30%	5,186,256	55.87%
Registered Electors	18,453		551,713		9,283,143	

=== 1982 Sri Lankan Presidential Election ===
Party	Vaddukoddai		Jaffna Electoral District		Sri Lanka	
Party	Votes	%	Votes	%	Votes	%
ACTC	9,741	44.07%	87,263	40.03%	173,934	2.67%
SLFP	7,770	35.15%	77,210	35.42%	2,546,348	39.05%
UNP	3,700	16.74%	44,775	20.54%	3,450,815	52.93%
JVP	380	1.72%	3,098	1.42%	273,428	4.19%
LSSP	257	1.16%	3,376	1.55%	58,531	0.90%
NSSP	255	1.15%	2,176	1.00%	16,995	0.26%
Valid Votes	22,103	95.36%	218,003	95.36%	6,520,156	98.78%
Rejected Votes	1,076	4.64%	10,610	4.64%	80,470	1.22%
Total Polled	23,179	50.16%	228,613	45.86%	6,600,626	80.15%
Registered Electors	46,206		498,545		8,235,358	

== Parliamentary Election Results ==
=== Summary ===
The winner of Vaddukoddai has matched the final country result 0 out of 7 times.

Year	Vaddukoddai	Jaffna Electoral District	MAE %	Sri Lanka	MAE %
2015	ITAK	ITAK	3.11%	UNP	35.28%
2010	ITAK	ITAK	8.39%	UPFA	26.40%
2004	ITAK	ITAK	1.30%	UPFA	6.24%
2001	TULF	TULF	3.99%	UNP	15.30%
2000	EPDP	EPDP	2.04%	PA	11.07%
1994	IND2	IND2	11.31%	PA	0.25%
1989	INDI	INDI	3.87%	UNP	27.51%
Matches/Mean MAE	0/7	0/7	4.86%	7/7	17.44%

=== 2015 Sri Lankan Parliamentary Election ===
Party	Vaddukoddai		Jaffna Electoral District		Sri Lanka	
Party	Votes	%	Votes	%	Votes	%
ITAK	17,237	66.15%	207,577	70.08%	515,963	4.63%
EPDP	2,843	10.91%	30,232	10.21%	33,481	0.30%
UNP	2,678	10.28%	20,025	6.76%	5,098,916	45.77%
AITC	1,320	5.07%	15,022	5.07%	18,644	0.17%
UPFA	1,311	5.03%	17,309	5.84%	4,732,664	42.48%
Other Parties (with < 1%)	668	2.56%	6,034	2.04%	580,476	5.21%
Valid Votes	26,057	89.44%	296,199	90.91%	11,140,333	95.35%
Rejected Votes	2,679	9.20%	25,496	7.83%	516,926	4.42%
Total Polled	29,132	61.17%	325,805	61.56%	11,684,111	77.66%
Registered Electors	47,621		529,239		15,044,490	

=== 2010 Sri Lankan Parliamentary Election ===
Party	Vaddukoddai		Jaffna Electoral District		Sri Lanka	
Party	Votes	%	Votes	%	Votes	%
ITAK	5,341	35.57%	65,119	44.03%	233,190	2.91%
UNP	3,438	22.90%	12,624	8.54%	2,357,057	29.37%
UPFA	3,286	21.89%	47,622	32.20%	4,846,388	60.38%
AITC	831	5.53%	6,362	4.30%	7,544	0.09%
Other Parties (with < 1%)	630	4.20%	6,584	4.45%	477,241	5.95%
IG1J	516	3.44%	2,648	1.79%	2,648	0.03%
TULF	388	2.58%	2,892	1.96%	9,223	0.11%
IG4J	252	1.68%	2,151	1.45%	2,151	0.03%
IG6J	171	1.14%	1,038	0.70%	1,038	0.01%
EDF	161	1.07%	858	0.58%	3,709	0.05%
Valid Votes	15,014	87.11%	147,898	87.89%	8,026,322	96.03%
Rejected Votes	2,128	12.35%	19,774	11.75%	581,465	6.96%
Total Polled	17,236	26.94%	168,277	22.68%	8,358,246	59.29%
Registered Electors	63,991		742,005		14,097,690	

=== 2004 Sri Lankan Parliamentary Election ===
Party	Vaddukoddai		Jaffna Electoral District		Sri Lanka	
Party	Votes	%	Votes	%	Votes	%
ITAK	24,240	91.96%	257,320	90.60%	633,203	6.85%
EPDP	1,513	5.74%	18,612	6.55%	24,942	0.27%
IP1D	485	1.84%	5,156	1.82%	6,121	0.07%
Other Parties (with < 1%)	120	0.46%	2,938	1.03%	764,786	8.28%
Valid Votes	26,358	91.20%	284,026	93.04%	9,241,931	94.52%
Rejected Votes	2,543	8.80%	21,233	6.96%	534,452	5.47%
Total Polled	28,901	47.16%	305,259	46.65%	9,777,821	75.74%
Registered Electors	61,283		654,415		12,909,631	

=== 2001 Sri Lankan Parliamentary Election ===
Party	Vaddukoddai		Jaffna Electoral District		Sri Lanka	
Party	Votes	%	Votes	%	Votes	%
TULF	9,800	52.55%	102,324	54.84%	348,164	3.89%
EPDP	4,609	24.71%	57,208	30.66%	72,783	0.81%
UNP	3,445	18.47%	16,245	8.71%	4,086,026	45.62%
DLF	461	2.47%	2,054	1.10%	6,214	0.07%
Other Parties (with < 1%)	335	1.80%	8,767	4.70%	1,046,289	11.68%
Valid Votes	18,650	92.66%	186,598	94.59%	8,955,844	94.77%
Rejected Votes	1,478	7.34%	10,681	5.41%	494,009	5.23%
Total Polled	20,128	33.01%	197,279	31.14%	9,449,878	76.03%
Registered Electors	60,967		633,457		12,428,762	

=== 2000 Sri Lankan Parliamentary Election ===
Party	Vaddukoddai		Jaffna Electoral District		Sri Lanka	
Party	Votes	%	Votes	%	Votes	%
EPDP	4,869	33.85%	41,536	36.13%	50,702	0.59%
TULF	4,035	28.05%	32,761	28.50%	105,907	1.23%
UNP	2,153	14.97%	10,896	9.48%	3,451,765	40.12%
L&DA	1,079	7.50%	2,502	2.18%	9,781	0.11%
ACTC	908	6.31%	10,618	9.24%	27,289	0.32%
DPLF	447	3.11%	4,778	4.16%	20,655	0.24%
Other Parties (with < 1%)	444	3.09%	4,917	4.28%	893,628	10.39%
IG6	241	1.68%	2,058	1.79%	3,162	0.04%
IG2	208	1.45%	4,905	4.27%	31,443	0.37%
Valid Votes	14,384	N/A	114,971	N/A	8,602,617	N/A

=== 1994 Sri Lankan Parliamentary Election ===
Party	Vaddukoddai		Jaffna Electoral District		Sri Lanka	
Party	Votes	%	Votes	%	Votes	%
IND2	556	90.85%	10,744	79.71%	16,690	0.21%
IND1	43	7.03%	374	2.77%	48,199	0.61%
EPRLF	8	1.31%	263	1.95%	9,411	0.12%
Other Parties (with < 1%)	5	0.82%	2,098	15.56%	143,307	1.80%
Valid Votes	612	95.77%	13,479	97.41%	7,943,688	95.20%
Rejected Votes	27	4.23%	358	2.59%	400,395	4.80%
Total Polled	639	1.08%	13,837	2.32%	8,344,095	74.75%
Registered Electors	58,949		596,375		11,163,064	

=== 1989 Sri Lankan Parliamentary Election ===
Party	Vaddukoddai		Jaffna Electoral District		Sri Lanka	
Party	Votes	%	Votes	%	Votes	%
INDI	17,814	67.52%	150,340	62.68%	175,579	3.14%
TULF	5,827	22.09%	60,013	25.02%	188,594	3.37%
DPLF	1,050	3.98%	7,993	3.33%	19,150	0.34%
SLMC	682	2.58%	8,439	3.52%	202,016	3.61%
ACTC	541	2.05%	7,610	3.17%	7,610	0.14%
UNP	470	1.78%	5,460	2.28%	2,838,005	50.71%
Valid Votes	26,384	89.13%	239,855	90.49%	5,596,468	93.87%
Rejected Votes	3,217	10.87%	25,203	9.51%	365,563	6.13%
Total Polled	29,601	50.37%	265,058	44.76%	5,962,031	63.60%
Registered Electors	58,770		592,210		9,374,164	

== Demographics ==
=== Ethnicity ===
The Vaddukoddai Polling Division has a Sri Lankan Tamil majority (99.4%) . In comparison, the Jaffna Electoral District (which contains the Vaddukoddai Polling Division) has a Sri Lankan Tamil majority (98.6%)

Ethnicity in Vaddukoddai
1. Sri Lankan Tamil (99.4%)
2. Other (0.60%)

=== Religion ===
The Vaddukoddai Polling Division has a Hindu majority (93.9%) . In comparison, the Jaffna Electoral District (which contains the Vaddukoddai Polling Division) has a Hindu majority (82.6%) and a significant Roman Catholic population (12.6%)

Religion in Vaddukoddai
1. Hindu (93.9%)
2. Other Christian (4.20%)
3. Roman Catholic (1.60%)
4. Other (0.30%)
