= Vaddukoddai =

Vaddukoddai வட்டுக்கோட்டை වඩුකෝඩයි
- Town
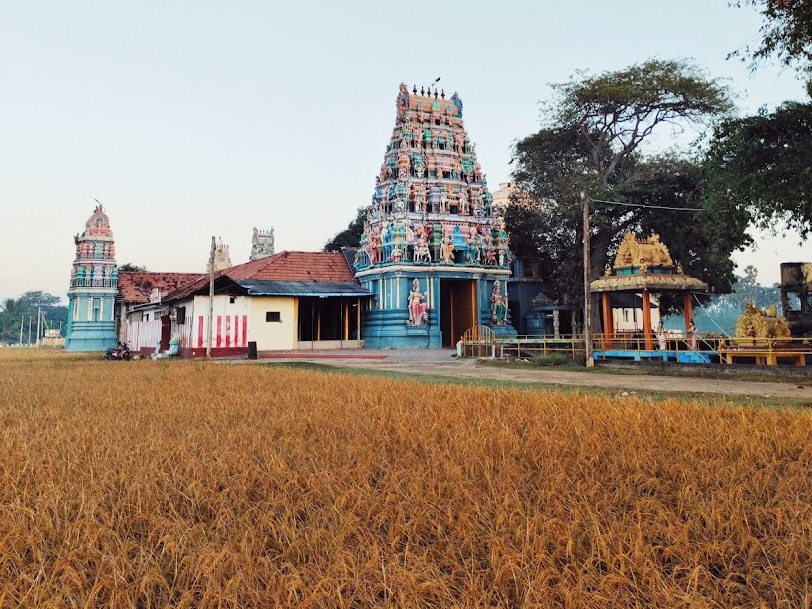
- Bhadrakali Amman Kovil

- Location within Northern Province Location within Sri Lanka
- Coordinates: 9°44′0″N 79°57′0″E
- Country: Sri Lanka
- Province: Northern
- District: Jaffna
- Divisional Secretariat: Valikamam West
- Electoral District: Jaffna Electoral District
- Polling Division: Vaddukoddai Polling Division

Vaddukoddai (Tamil: வட்டுக்கோட்டை, romanized: Vaṭṭukkōṭṭai, Sinhala: වඩුකෝඩයි) (also spelt Vatukotai, Vaddukkoddai) is a small but important town in the minority Sri Lankan Tamil dominated Jaffna Peninsula of Sri Lanka. It is famous for cultural dances and Hindu rituals.

It became prominent with the founding of Asia’s first modern university level collegiate known as Batticotta Seminary by the American Missionaries from New England in 1823.

== Demography ==
Most of the residents of the village are Sri Lankan Tamils, with the majority being Hindus and a few Christians. As of 2007, due to the effects of the Sri Lankan civil war the actual number of residents is unknown.

== Educational institutions ==
The village is home to the prominent Jaffna College that was founded as the Batticotta Seminary. Jaffna College is one of the most famous colleges in Jaffna, and is the only private mixed school. Students come from areas such as Batticaloa and Kandy, as well as Jaffna. Vaddukoddai is also home to the Vaddukoddai Hindu College it was founded by Ambalavana Navalar, The Only National School in there. Jaffna College Institute of Technology, a polytechnic that is used for various vocational training requirements. and one more important secondary institute of education, Vaddu Central College

Category	School	Grades	Type	Roll	Address	Medium	Sex	Admin District	Zone	Div
National	Vaddukoddai Hindu College	6-13	1AB		Sithankerny, Vaddukoddai	Tamil, English	Mixed	JAF	Valikamam	Chankanai
Provincial	Vaddu Central College	1-13	1C		Vaddu South-West	Tamil	Mixed	JAF	Valikamam	Chankanai
Provincial	Vaddu Subramania Vidyasalai	1-5	3		Vaddu West	Tamil	Mixed	JAF	Valikamam	Chankanai
Provincial	Vaddu Karthikeya Vidyalayam	1-5	3		Vaddu South	Tamil	Mixed	JAF	Valikamam	Chankanai
Provincial	Vaddu West A.M.T.M School	1-5	3		Vaddu West	Tamil	Mixed	JAF	Valikamam	Chankanai
Provincial	Vaddu Thirunavukarasu Vidyalayam	1-5	3		Vaddu West	Tamil	Mixed	JAF	Valikamam	Chankanai
Provincial	Thavalai Saivaththamil Vidyalayam	1-5	3		Thavalai Road	Tamil	Mixed	JAF	Valikamam	Chankanai
Private	Jaffna College	1-13	1AB		Vaddukoddai	Tamil, English	Mixed	JAF	Valikamam	Chankanai

- Schools in Vaddukoddai

== Religious establishments ==
An Amman temple at Sangarathai, a Murugan temples at Adaikalam Thoddam and Panguru are three of the main Hindu temples found here.

- Bhadrakali Amman Kovil - Sangarathai
- Adaikalam Thoddam Kanthaswamy Kovil
- Panguru Murugan Kovil

The Church of South India has 21 administrative division throughout the world. It has only one of them known as a diocese in Sri Lanka. The Jaffna Diocese headquarters is in Vaddukoddai.

== History ==
The name of the village suggests that at some point in its history it had a fortress in its midst, possibly from the Aryacakravarti dynasty. But rule by various colonial powers since 1621 has erased all evidence of a fort. The village became prominent during the British colonial period in Sri Lanka as it was chosen as location for one of the nine protestant missions to be established within the small Jaffna peninsula (hardly 15 by 40 miles). The move by the seminary to study Saiva scriptures led to an important social transformation amongst the local Tamils because it began a process that led to a Saiva revivalism led by Arumuka Navalar. Eventually the seminary was renamed Jaffna college and became a secular institution in 1867. The village also played an important role in the recent Sri Lankan civil war as the place where the Tamil United Liberation Front party came up with the Vaddukoddai Resolution in 1976 that articulated the view that minority Sri Lankan Tamils needed separation from rest of Sri Lanka to resolve their political problems.
