= List of Archaeological Protected Monuments in Jaffna District =

This is a list of Archaeological Protected Monuments in Jaffna District, Sri Lanka.

Monument	Image	Location	Grama Niladhari Division	Divisional Secretary's Division	Registered	Description	Refs
Achchuveli Dutch Church		Achchuveli	Achchuveli North	Valikamam East	30 December 2011	Ruins of Dutch Church	
Arumuka Navalar’s house		Aththiyady	Aththiyady	Jaffna	30 December 2011		
Cankilian Thoppu palace entrance		Nallur	Cankilian Thoppu	Nallur	23 February 2007	Entrance to Cankilian Thoppu Palace	
Cankilian Thoppu palace foundation		Nallur	Cankilian Thoppu	Nallur	30 December 2011	Old building foundation	
Chankanai Dutch Church			Chankanai South	Valikamam West	23 February 2007		
Church of the Presentation of the Lord (Myliddy Church)		Myliddy		Valikamam North	16 July 1948		
Dambakola Patuna Sangamiththa Temple		Sammithurai	Mathagal West	Valikamam West	23 February 2007	Sangamiththa monument	
Delft baobab tree		Kavolaiyampalai	Delft East	Delft	22 July 2011		
Delft Island fort (Meegamen Fort)		Sikiriyampallam	Delft Center West	Delft	30 December 2011		
Delft Pigeon House		Gurunagar West	Delft Center	Delft	30 December 2011	Pigeon house and other ruined buildings	
Fort Hammenheil		Kayts West	Kayts	Islands North	23 February 2007		
Indu Sathanam Hall		Neeraviyady	Neeraviyady	Nallur	30 December 2011		
Jaffna Fort		Jaffna	Fort	Jaffna	16 July 1948		
Jaffna Hindu College		Jaffna	Neeraviyady	Nallur	30 December 2011	Old building	
Jaffna Kachcheri		Jaffna	Chundikuli North	Jaffna	30 December 2011		
Kadurugoda Vihara		Chunnakam	Kantharodai	Valikamam South	17 May 2013	Kadurugoda settlement	
Kathiresan Temple		Vannarpannai	Vannarpannai	Jaffna	30 December 2011		
Kayts Dutch Church		Kayts West	Kayts	Islands North	23 February 2007		
Kayts Island fort		Kayts		Islands North			
Kilnar Hall		Vannarpannai	Vannarpannai	Jaffna	30 December 2011		
Kotteikadu ruins		Kotteikadu	Delft West	Delft	30 December 2011	Ruins of Buddhist stupa	
Kovilan Point Lighthouse		Karaitivu	Karainagar North West	Karainagar	22 July 2011		
Manalkadu Dutch Church			Manalkadu	Vadamarachchi East	30 December 2011		
Mantri Manai (Jaffna Palace ruins)		Nallur	Nallur Rajathani	Nallur	23 February 2007	Ancient Manthri palace	
Maviddapuram Kandaswamy Temple		Maviddapuram	Maviddapuram South	Valikamam North	30 December 2011		
Muthukumara Swamy Temple		Vathiri	Nelliady East	Vadamarachchi; South West	30 December 2011	Old pond, moat, well and other stone ruins	
Nagadeepa Purana Viharaya		Nainativu	Nainativu North	Islands South	23 February 2007	Rock inscription	
Naguleswaram Temple		Keerimalai	Naguleswaram	Valikamam North	30 December 2011	Kovil and old Ambalama	
Navalar Maha Vidyalayam		Vannarpannai	Vannarpannai	Jaffna	30 December 2011	Old building and Kuravar Kovil	
Nilavarai Pond			Navakiri	Valikamam East	23 February 2007	Pond and ancient Buddhist ruins	
Pungudutivu Church		Pungudutivu	Pungudutivu Center North	Islands South	30 December 2011	Church of South India Church	
Queen's Tower (Delft Light House)		Alamavanam	Delft East	Delft	22 July 2011		
Sarapiddy ruins		Sarapiddy	Delft South	Delft	30 December 2011	Water well and other ruins	
Sarapiddy stable		Sarapiddy	Delft South	Delft	17 May 2013	Ancient stable	
St. Anthony's Church		Karampon	Karampon	Islands North	17 May 2013		
St. Anthony's Villa (Bishop's House)		Karampon	Karampon	Islands North	17 May 2013		
St. Francis' Church		Alvai	Alvai North	Vadamarachchi North	30 December 2011		
St. James' Church		Nallur	Nallur Rajathani	Nallur	30 December 2011	Old church	
St. John the Baptist Church		Chundikuli	Chundikuli North	Jaffna	30 December 2011		
St. Martin's Missionary building		Jaffna	Jaffa Town East	Jaffna	17 May 2013		
St. Peter's Church		Mandaitivu	Mandaitivu East/South/West	Islands South	30 December 2011		
St. Thomas' Cathedral (Vaddukoddai Church)		Vaddukoddai	Vaddukoddai South West	Valikamam West	30 December 2011		
Therimudi doss house		Near Pasupatheeswarar; Kovil	Point Pedro	Vadamarachchi North	30 December 2011		
Vaitheeswaran Temple		Vannarpannai	Koddady	Jaffna	30 December 2011		
Vedi Arasan Fort		Near Mangaraikarasi; Vidyalayam	Delft West	Delft	23 February 2007	Ancient Buddhist ruins	
Veerapattiyar Kovil		Uduppiddy	Uduppiddy South	Vadamarachchi; South West	30 December 2011	Stone pillars with Tamil inscription	
Yamuna Eri pond		Jaffna		Nallur	16 July 1948		
Jaffna Sanghamitta Bodhi tree in Parali Murugan Temple		Parali	No. J/174 of Chulipuram East	Valikamam West	1 February 2023	Ancient Bodhi Tree	
