= Jaffna Town East Grama Niladhari Division =

Jaffna Town East
- Grama Niladhari Division
- Interactive map of Jaffna Town East
- Coordinates: 9.661517°N 80.021383°E
- Country: Sri Lanka
- Province: Northern Province
- District: Jaffna District
- Divisional Secretariat: Jaffna Divisional Secretariat
- Electoral District: Jaffna Electoral District
- Polling Division: Jaffna Polling Division

Area
  - Total: 0.4 km^{2} (0.15 sq mi)
- Elevation: 0 m (0 ft)

Population (2012)
  - Total: 1,988
  - Density: 4,970/km^{2} (12,900/sq mi)
- ISO 3166 code: LK-4136070

Jaffna Town East

Jaffna Town East Grama Niladhari Division is a Grama Niladhari Division of the Jaffna Divisional Secretariat of Jaffna District of Northern Province, Sri Lanka. It has Grama Niladhari Division Code J/74.

Holy Family Convent, Jaffna, Jaffna railway station, Roman Catholic Diocese of Jaffna, St. Mary's Cathedral, Jaffna, Jaffna, St. Patrick's College, Jaffna, Vembadi Girls High School, St. John's College, Jaffna, Subhas Hotel and Vannarpannai South East are located within, nearby or associated with Jaffna Town East.

Jaffna Town East is a surrounded by the Jaffna Town West, Chundikuli South, Gurunagar East, Attiaddy, Chundikuli North and Gurunagar West Grama Niladhari Divisions.

== Demographics ==
=== Ethnicity ===
The Jaffna Town East Grama Niladhari Division has a Sri Lankan Tamil majority (97.4%). In comparison, the Jaffna Divisional Secretariat (which contains the Jaffna Town East Grama Niladhari Division) has a Sri Lankan Tamil majority (95.6%)

Ethnicity in Jaffna Town East
1. Sri Lankan Tamil (97.4%)
2. Other (1.40%)
3. Burgher (1.30%)

=== Religion ===
The Jaffna Town East Grama Niladhari Division has a Roman Catholic majority (63.9%) and a significant Hindu population (27.5%). In comparison, the Jaffna Divisional Secretariat (which contains the Jaffna Town East Grama Niladhari Division) has a Roman Catholic majority (52.9%) and a significant Hindu population (37.7%)

Religion in Jaffna Town East
1. Roman Catholic (63.9%)
2. Hindu (27.5%)
3. Other Christian (7.80%)
4. Other (0.90%)

== Gallery ==
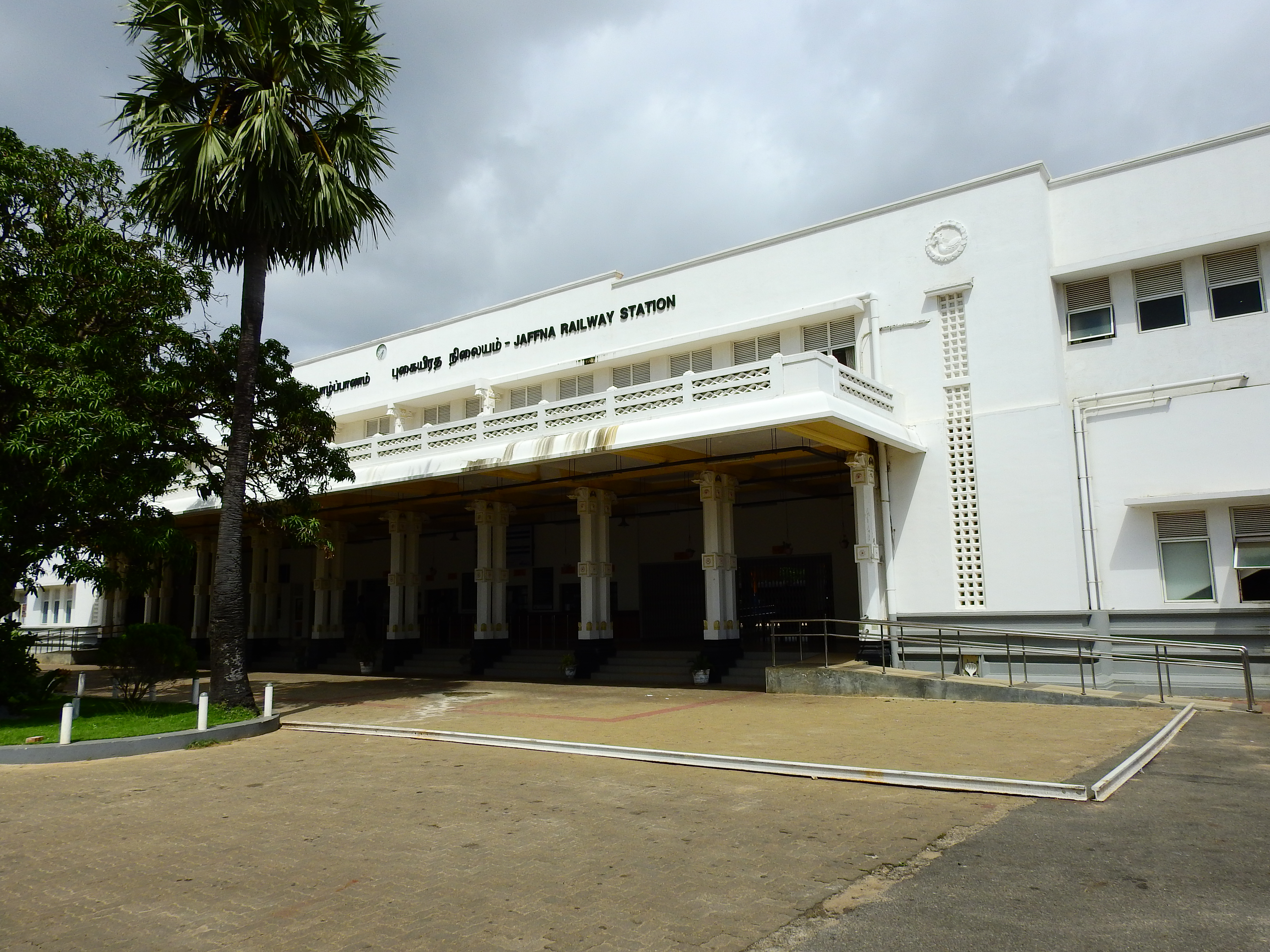
Jaffna railway station

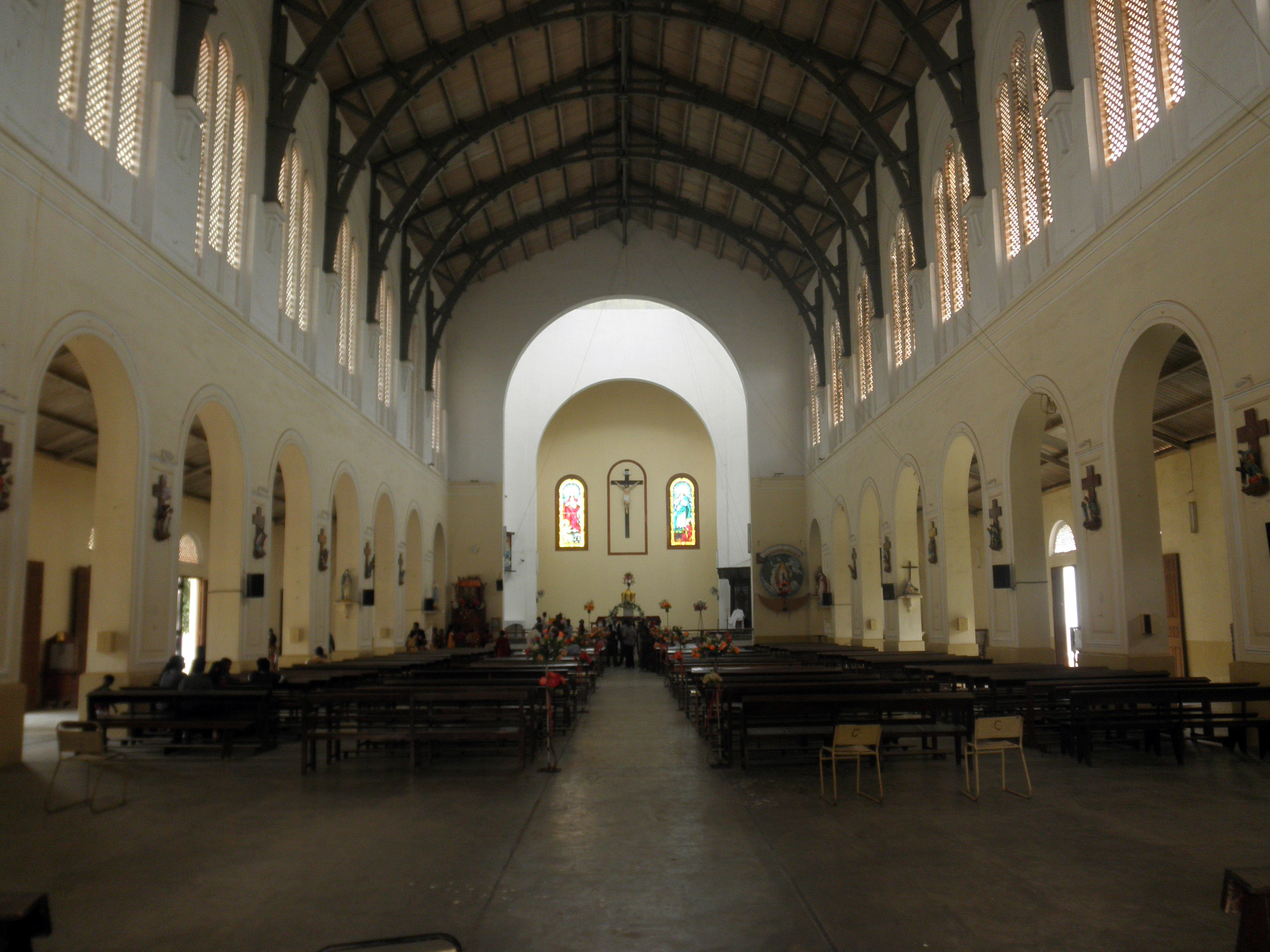
Roman Catholic Diocese of Jaffna

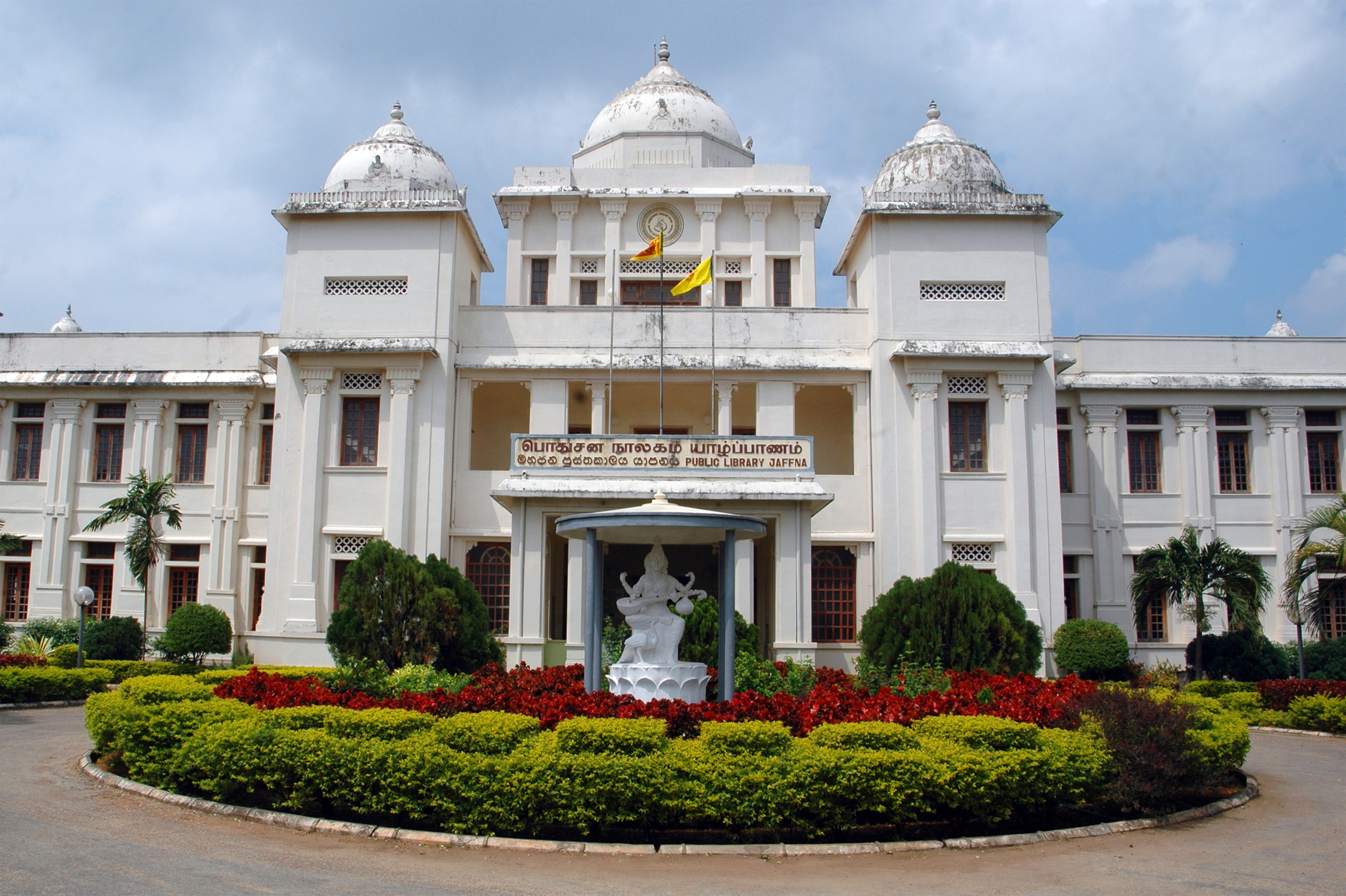
Jaffna Public Library

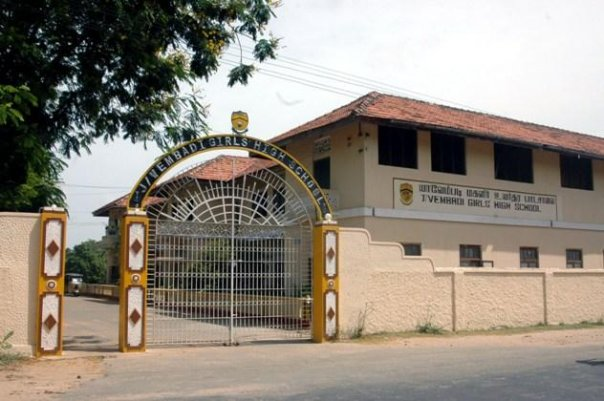
Vembadi Girls High School

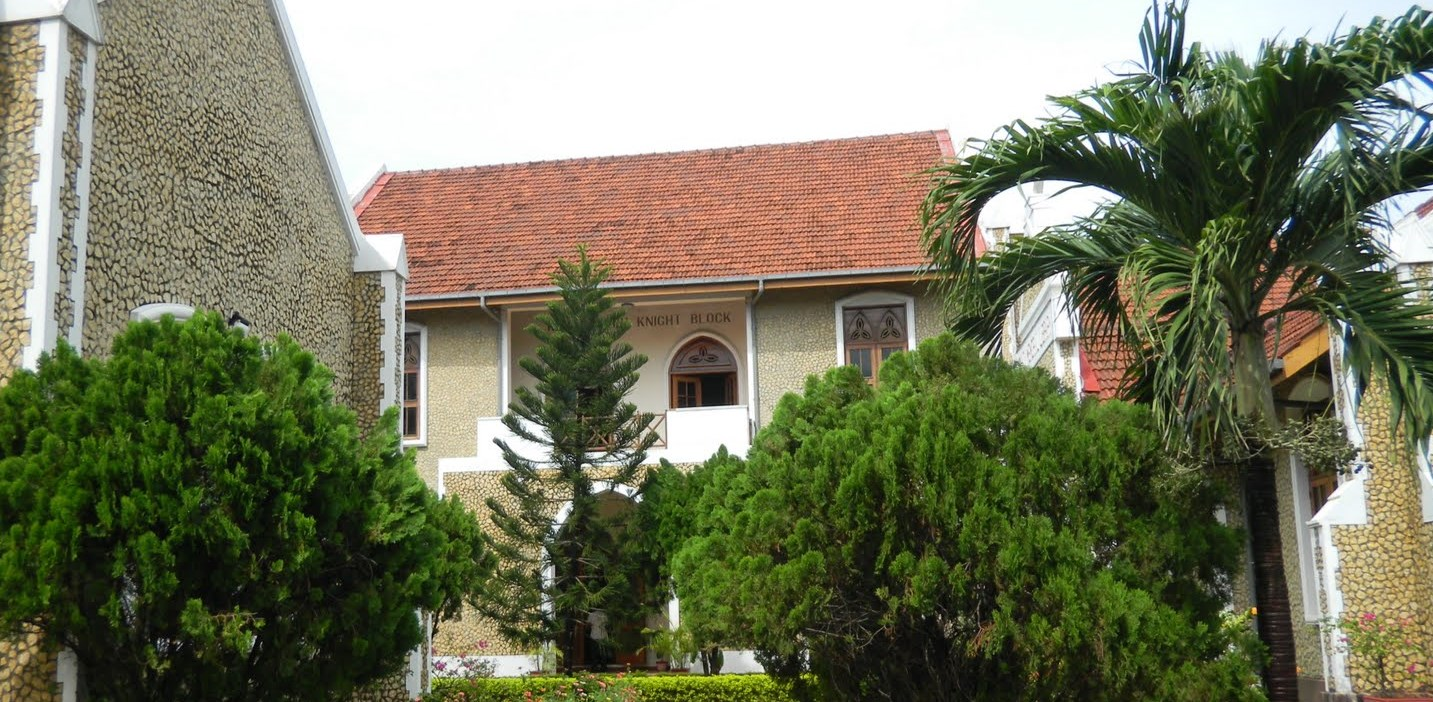
St. John's College, Jaffna
