= Velupillai =

Velupillai வேலுப்பிள்ளை
- Pronunciation: Vēluppiḷḷai
- Gender: Male
- Language: Tamil

Origin
- Region of origin: Southern India; North-eastern Sri Lanka

Other names
- Alternative spelling: Veluppillai; Velupillay

Velupillai or Veluppillai(Tamil: வேலுப்பிள்ளை) is a Tamil male given name. Due to the Tamil tradition of using patronymic surnames it may also be a surname for males and females.

== Notable people ==
=== Given name ===
- A. Veluppillai (1936–2015), Sri Lankan historian and academic
- Vela Velupillai (born 1947), Sri Lankan economist

=== Surname ===
- C. Velupillai Kandaiah Sivagnanam, Sri Lankan civil servant and politician
- Kanthapillai Velupillai Nadarajah (1905–2000), Ceylonese lawyer and politician
- Nishan Velupillay (born 2001), Australian footballer
- Samuel James Veluppillai Chelvanayakam (1898–1977), Ceylonese lawyer and politician
- Velupillai Ambalavanar Kandiah (1891–1963), Ceylonese lawyer and politician
- Velupillai Appapillai (1913–2001), Sri Lankan physicist and academic
- Velupillai Coomaraswamy (1892–?), Ceylonese civil servant and diplomat
- Velupillai Kumaraswamy (1919–?), Ceylonese lawyer and politician
- Velupillai Prabhakaran (1954–2009), Sri Lankan rebel
- Velupillai Suppiah Thurairajah (1927–2011), Sri Lankan architect
