= Thurairajah =

Thurairajah துரைராஜா
- Pronunciation: Turairājā
- Gender: Male
- Language: Tamil

Origin
- Region of origin: Southern India; North-eastern Sri Lanka

Other names
- Alternative spelling: Thurairaja

Thurairajah or Thurairaja (Tamil: துரைராஜா, romanized: Turairājā) is a Tamil male given name. Due to the Tamil tradition of using patronymic surnames it may also be a surname for males and females.

== Notable people ==
=== Given name ===
- A. Thurairajah (1934–1994), Sri Lankan academic
- Chelliah Thurairaja, Sri Lankan army officer
- S. Thurairaja, Sri Lankan judge
- V. S. Thurairajah (1927–2011), Sri Lankan architect

=== Surname ===
- Meary James Thurairajah Tambimuttu (1915–1983), Sri Lankan poet
- Thurairajah Raviharan, Sri Lankan politician
