= Mantri Manai =

Historic palace in Jaffna, Sri Lanka

- மந்திரி மனை
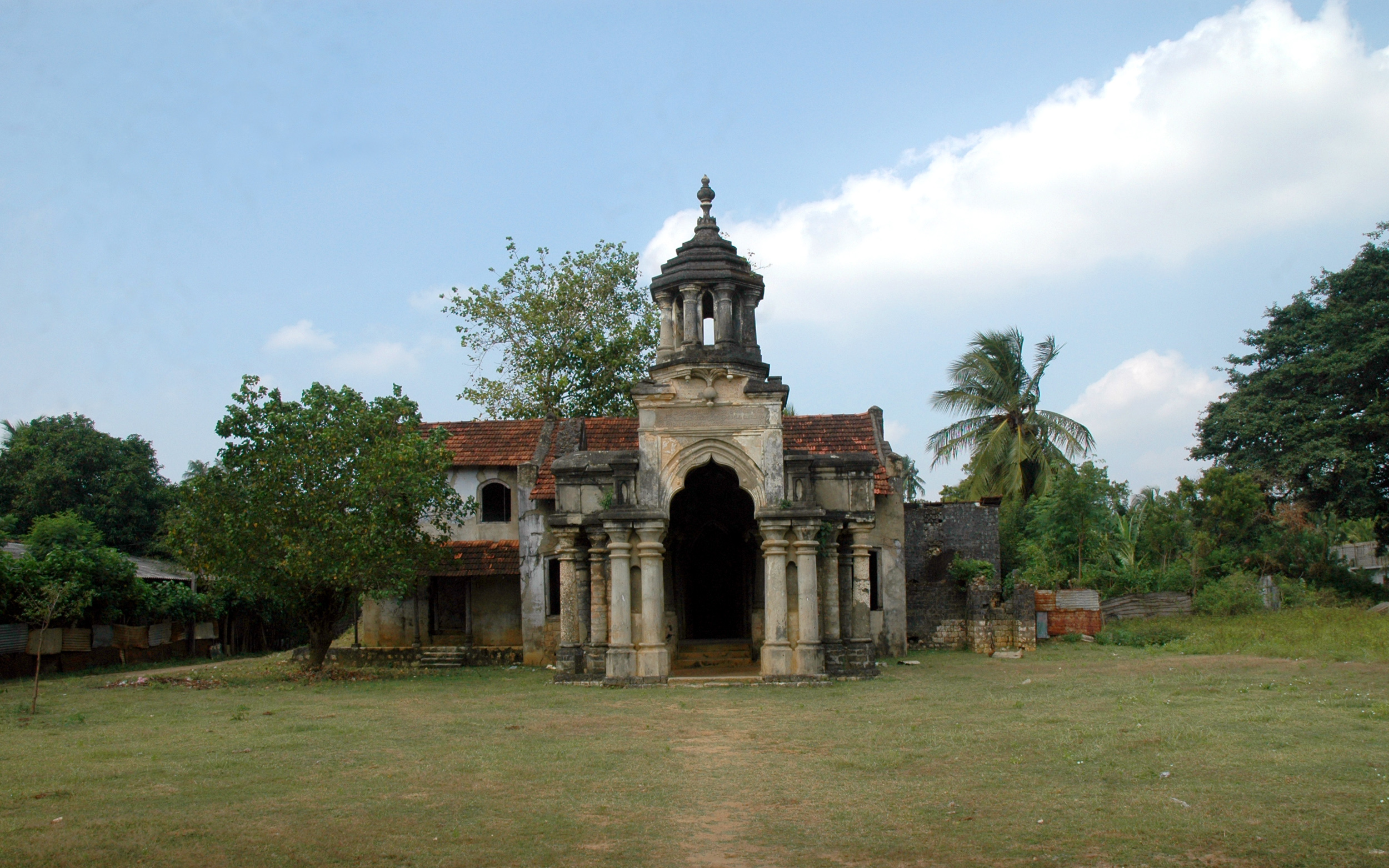
- Mantri Manai

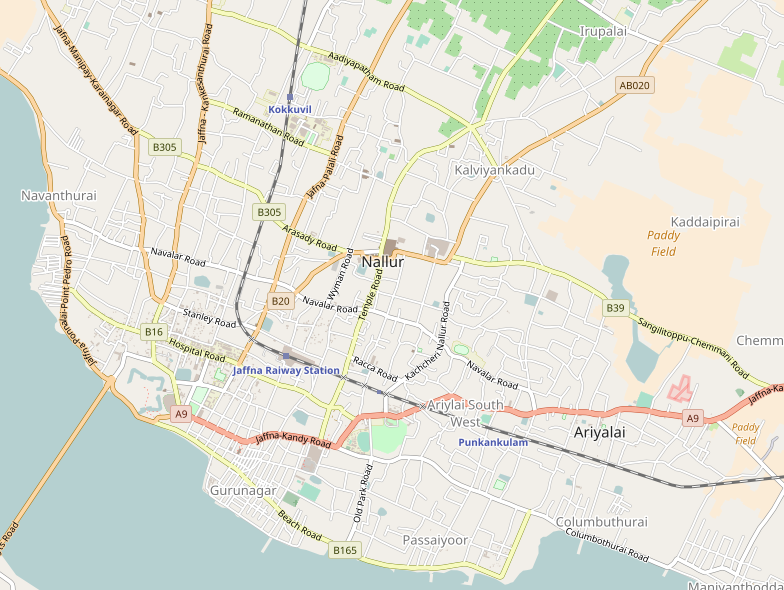
- Location within Greater Jaffna

General information
- Status: Good
- Location: Jaffna, Sri Lanka
- Coordinates: 9°40′38.9″N 80°02′09.3″E
- Owner: Sri Lankan government
- Landlord: S. Thambipillai

Height
- Architectural: European and Dravidian

Technical details
- Material: Brick, lime plaster, wood, tile

Design and construction
- Designations: Archaeological protected monument (23 February 2007)
- Known for: Jaffna kingdom

Mantri Manai or Manthiri Manai (pronounced [mən̪d̪ɪɾɪˑmənəj]; literally Abode of Minister) is a historic palace situated in Nallur, Jaffna, Sri Lanka. It is one of the archaeological protected monuments in Jaffna District and was listed by the Sri Lankan government in 2007.

The palace is associated with the Jaffna kingdom. It is believed to be one of the palaces or residences of a minister of Cankili, king of Jaffna, before the fall of the Jaffna kingdom to the Portuguese. The building is surrounded by other historical remains of the Jaffna kingdom such as the Sattanathar temple, which was one of the city temples of the kingdom; Yamuna Eri and Cankilian Thoppu are also located nearby. However, much of the architectural style belongs to the post-Jaffna kingdom era.

== The different theories ==
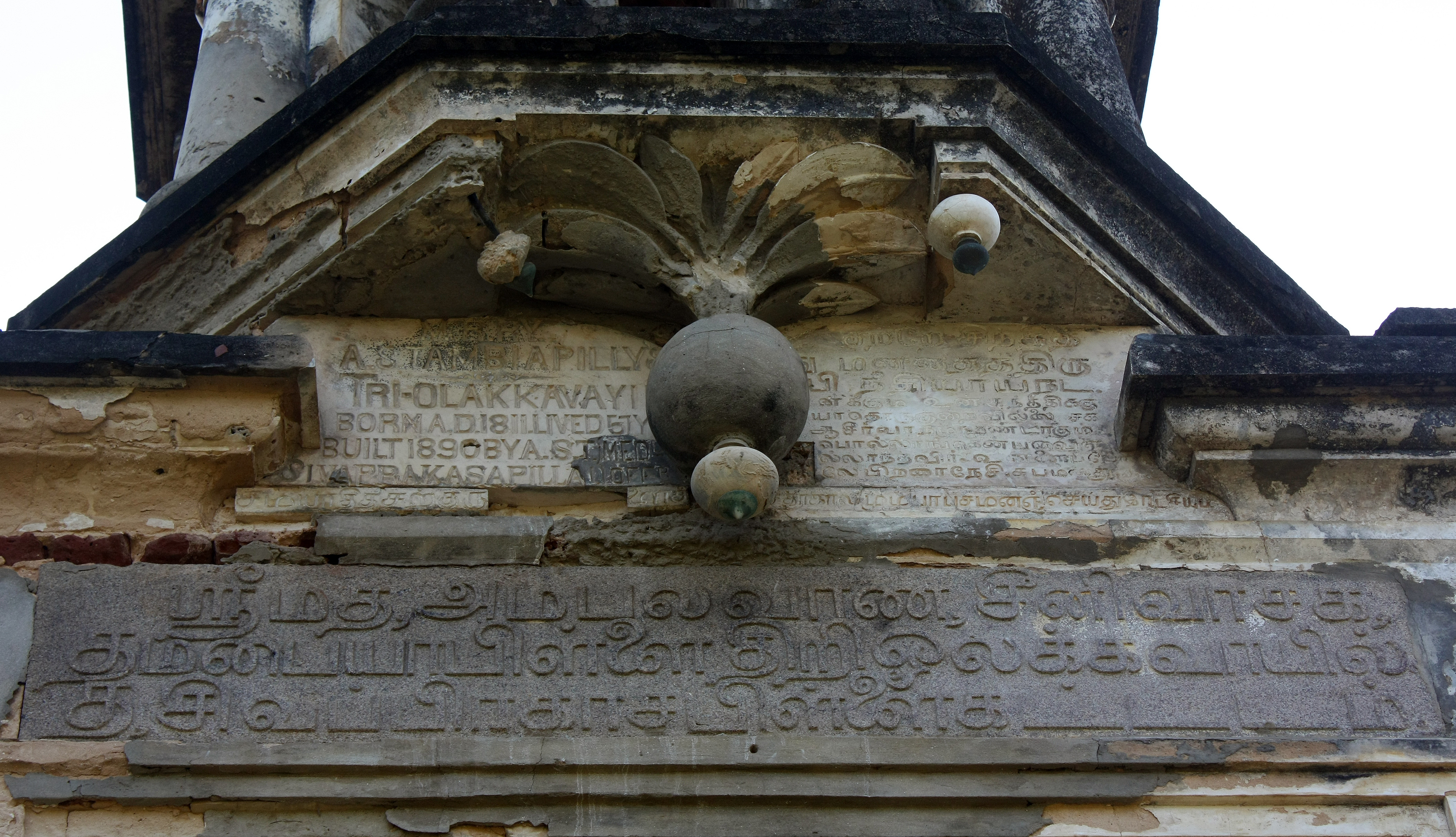
Embedded letters on porch indicates built 1890

There are a number of contradictory theories about the origin of the building. Some historians say that it could have been built during the Dutch period, referring to the building materials used (bricks, lime plaster, wood and tiles), the structure and ornamental work. Alternatively, the ornamental work on pillars, capitals and the arched porch appear to belong to the Jaffna kingdom's era.

After the fall of Nallur, the Portuguese shifted their capital to Jaffna, but they made use of existing structures. Also, the Dutch used pre-existing buildings and they constructed new buildings as well. According to the historians' view, the Mantri Manai could have been renovated or newly constructed by the Dutch. Another source says that the building has no connection with the Jaffna kingdom, but is a 19th-century choultry (guesthouse).

== Style ==
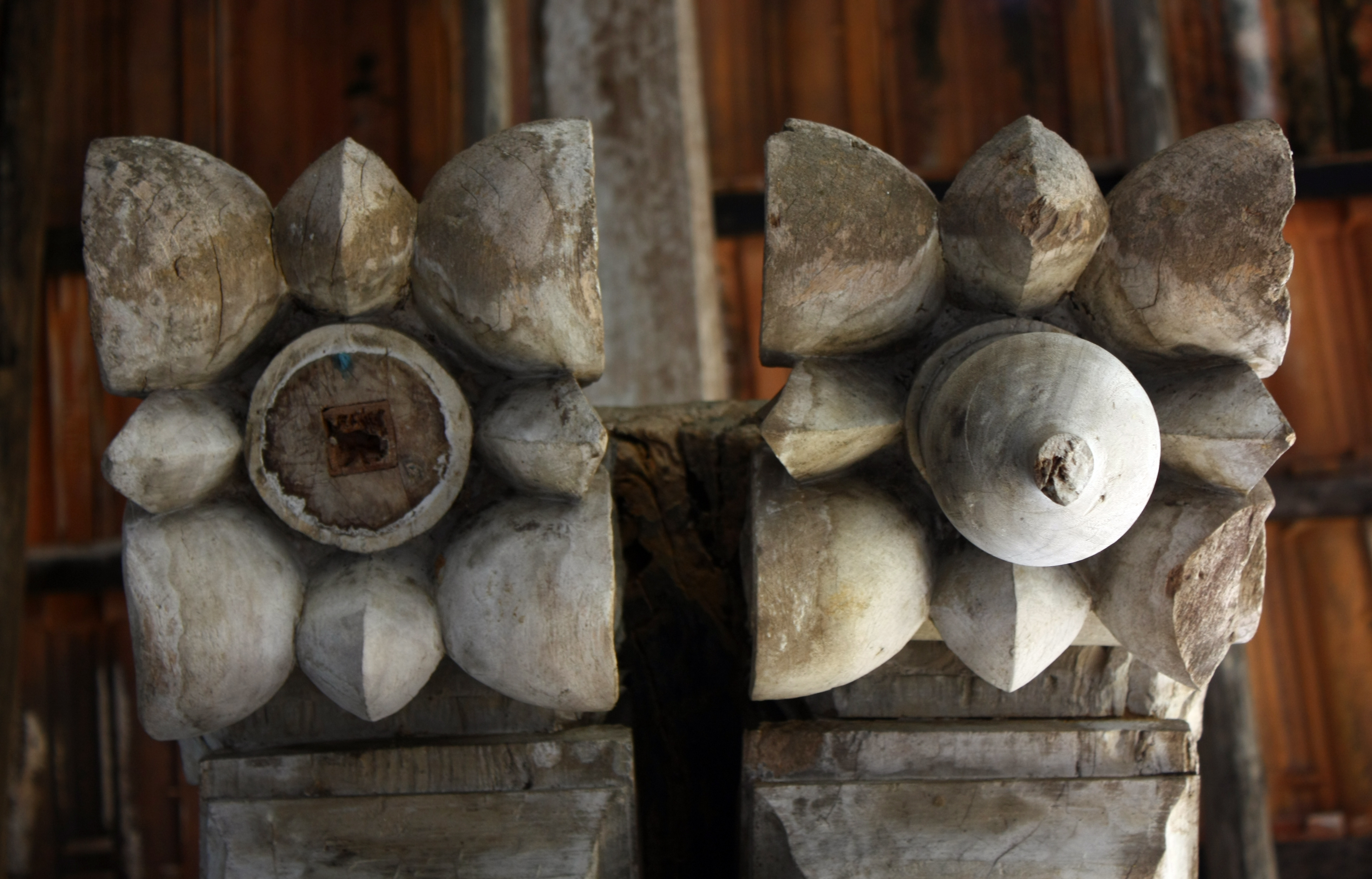
A wood carving in capital

The Mantri Manai is built in a mixture of European and Dravidian architecture styles. The entrance has an ornamental gateway, a large arched porch and a tower. It is a two-storey structure with wooden carvings decorating the interior walls. It has a well and a wash basin, a cellar, and a staircase leading down to underground rooms and secret tunnels.

== See also ==
- Jaffna Palace ruins
