= Yamuna Eri =

Ancient pond in Jaffna, Sri Lanka

- யமுனா ஏரி (Tamil)
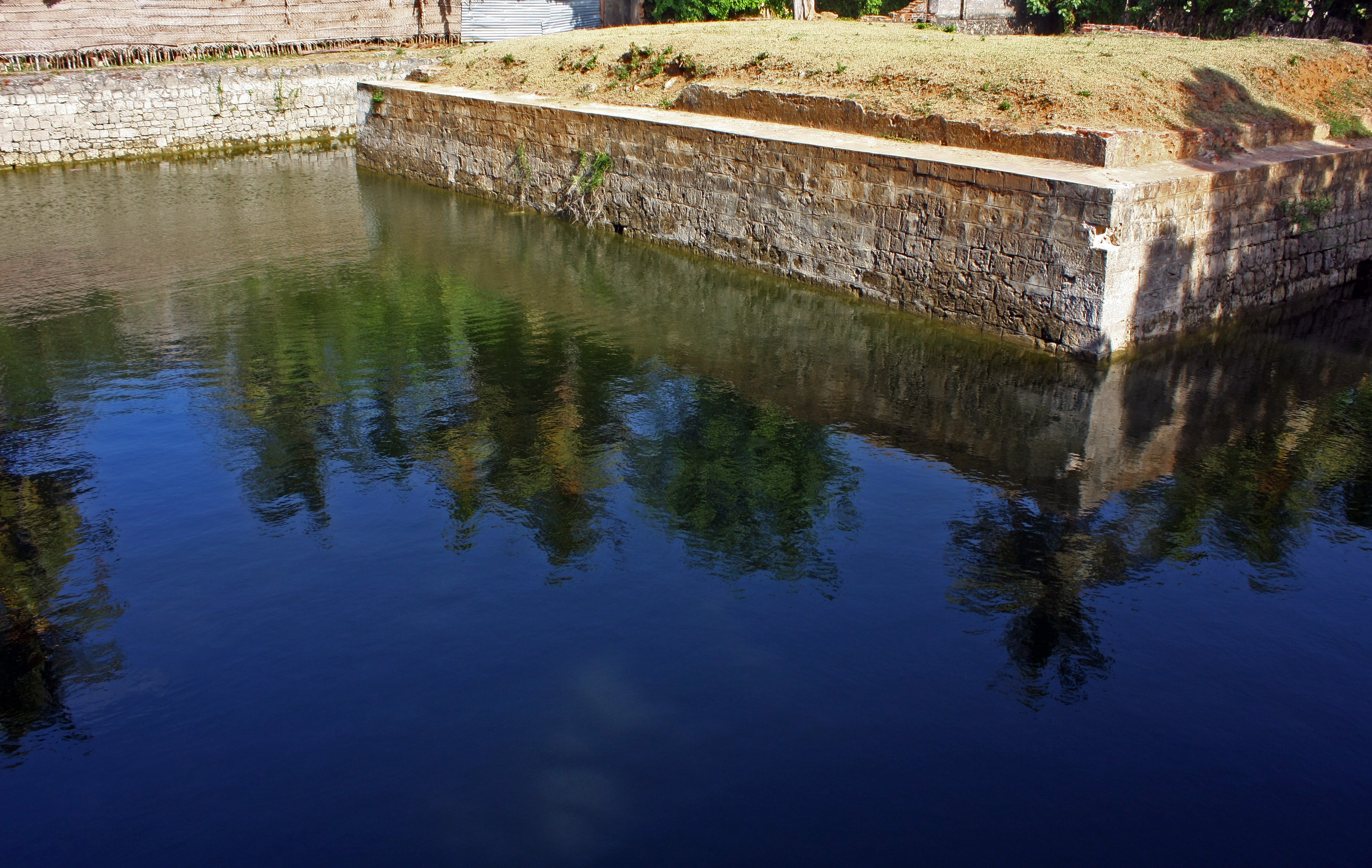
- Partial view of Yamuna Eri

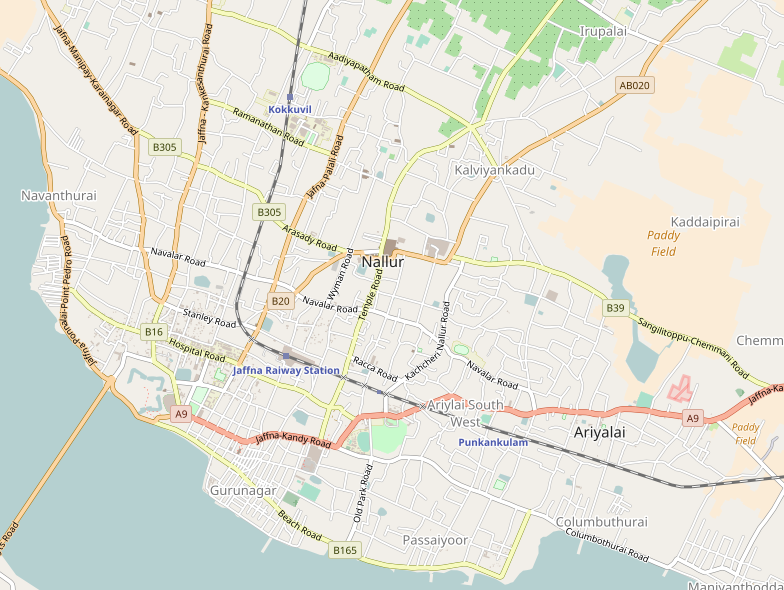
- Location in greater Jaffna
- Location: Nallur, Jaffna, Sri Lanka
- Coordinates: 9°40′28.7″N 80°02′16.3″E
- Type: Pond
- Designation: Archaeological protected monument (16 July 1948)

Yamuna Eri (pronounced [jəmʉnɑː ʲeːɾɪ]; lit. Yamuna lake) is an ancient pond situated in Nallur, Jaffna, Sri Lanka. In 1948, it was listed as one of the protected archaeological monuments in the Jaffna District by the Sri Lankan government.

One of the ruins of the Jaffna kingdom, Yamuna Eri is located near the Mantri Manai palace and the Cankilian Thoppu arch. According to the chronological historical book Yalpana Vaipava Malai, it was built during the reign of the Jaffna Kingdom King Cinkai Ariyan Cekaracacekaran I. The text describes the King bringing sacred water from India's Yamuna River and mixing it with the water in the pond.

Original text: Tamil: ...நாலு மதிலும் எழுப்பி, வாசலும் ஒழுங்காய் விடுத்து, மாட மாளிகையும், கூட கோபுரங்களையும், பூங்காவையும், பூங்காவன நடுவிலே ஸ்நான மண்டபமும் முப்புடைக் கூபமும் உண்டாக்கி அக்கூபத்திலே, யமுனாநதி தீர்த்தமும் அழைப்பித்துக் கலந்துவிட்டு...

Translation: ...he afterwards built the city of Nallur with all its ramparts, gates, mansions, palaces, towers, flower-gardens, baths, stables for elephants and horses, halls of justice, pleasure-houses, dwellings for Brahmans and warriors.... He dug a three-sided well with whose water, he mixed water brought from the sacred river Yamunai.

The Yalpana Vaipava Malai is contradicted by another source, however, which suggests that the pond was built by a later king, Singai Pararasasegaram (1478–1519). In either case, the pond derives its name from the Indian river from which sacred waters were brought. The pond is built as a "three-sided well", in the shape of the Tamil letter, "ப", and was made in brick with stone steps that were built to reach both the inside and the outside, allowing for convenient bathing. There is a decorative flower garden located in the centre. Local legends have it that Yamuna Eri was used by the Queen of Jaffna Kingdom, and was linked to Mantri Manai ("the minister's palace") by an underground tunnel. A similar legend has Tamil Kings and royal families using the pond. Yet another legend has the pond being used for offering ritual baths to the idol of Kartikeya, the primary deity of the Nallur Kandaswamy temple. Conquerors of the Jaffna Kingdom are also believed to have used the pond for bathing.

== Panorama view ==
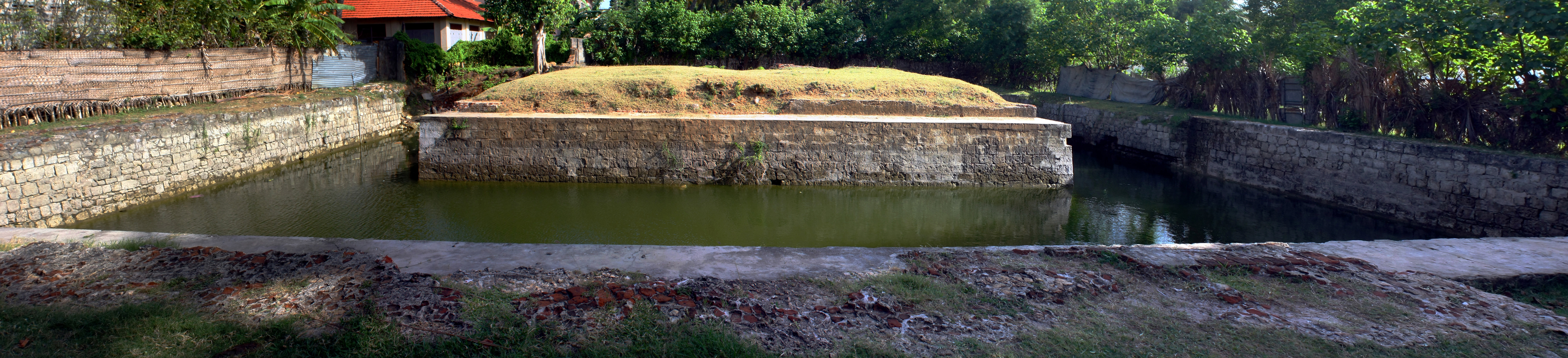
ப shaped Yamuna Eri

== See also ==
- Jaffna Palace ruins
