= Vannarpannai Navalar Maha Vidyalayam =

Vannarpannai Navalar M.V.
- வண்ணார்பண்ணை நாவலர் ம.வி.

Location
- Vannarpannai; Jaffna, Jaffna District, Northern Province; Sri Lanka; 9°40′27.50″N 80°00′40.80″E

Information
- School type: Public provincial 2
- School district: Jaffna Education Zone
- Authority: Northern Provincial Council
- School number: 1001023
- Teaching staff: 20
- Grades: 1-11
- Gender: Mixed
- Age range: 5-16

Vannarpannai Navalar Maha Vidyalayam (Tamil: வண்ணார்பண்ணை நாவலர் மகா வித்தியாலயம் Vaṇṇārpaṇṇai Nāvalar Makā Vittiyālayam, also known as Vannai Navalar Secondary School) is a provincial school in Jaffna, Sri Lanka.

== See also ==
- List of schools in Northern Province, Sri Lanka
