= Ruins of the Jaffna kingdom =

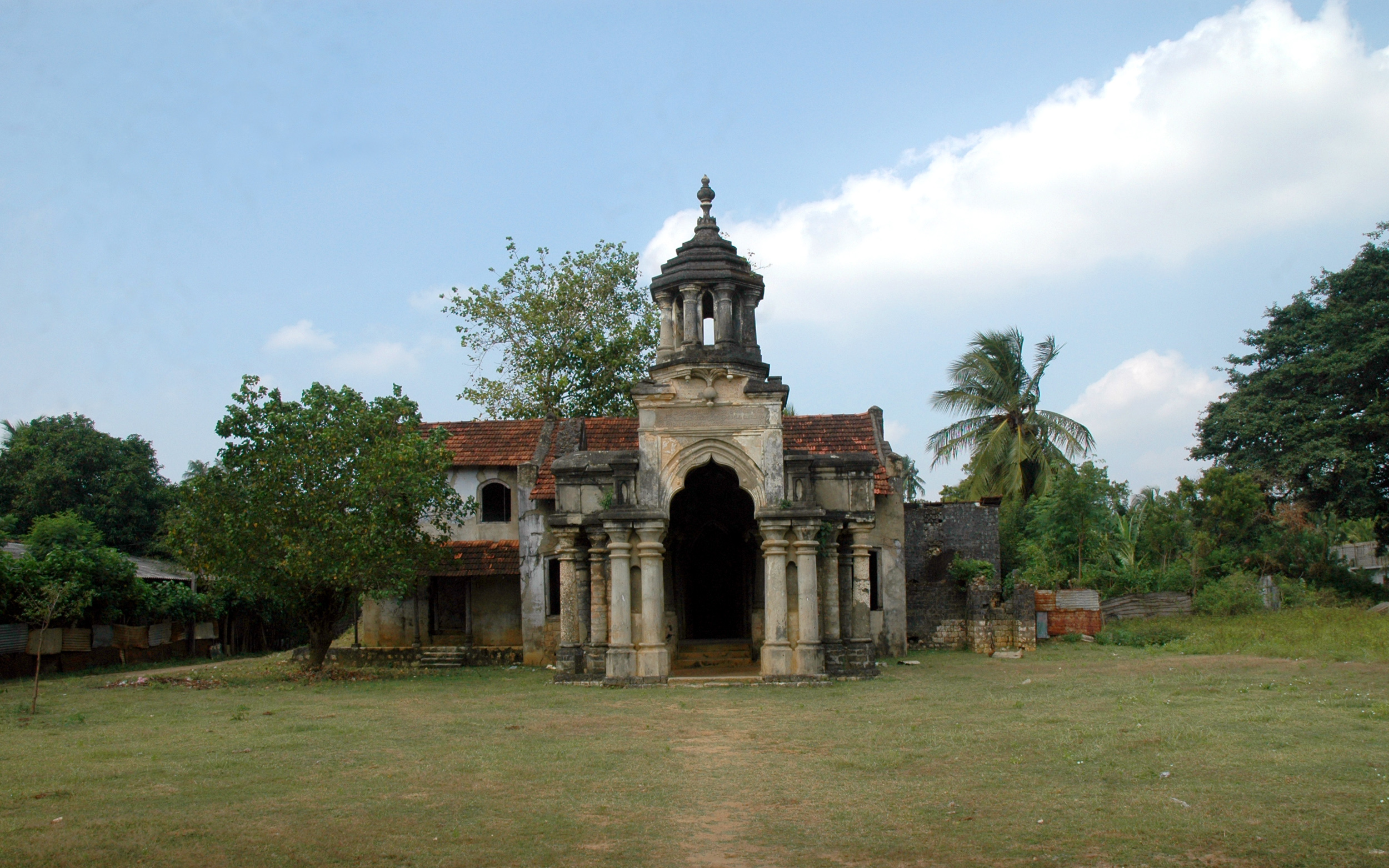
Mantri Manai or Residence of the Ministers among the ruins

The ruins of the Jaffna kingdom are the remains of the building structures of the Jaffna Kingdom, the royal abode and structure of the ruling dynasty of the kingdom of Jaffna, Nallur, Jaffna, in Northern Sri Lanka.

== History and inception ==
The palace was the home to the Aryacakravarti dynasty which became a powerful force in the North and North-East of the islands prior to the conquest of the Portuguese into the island.

According to Ibn Batuta, a renowned Moroccan historian, the kingdom had two capitals; Nallur was one and the other being Puttalam presently in the North Western Province.

== Architecture ==
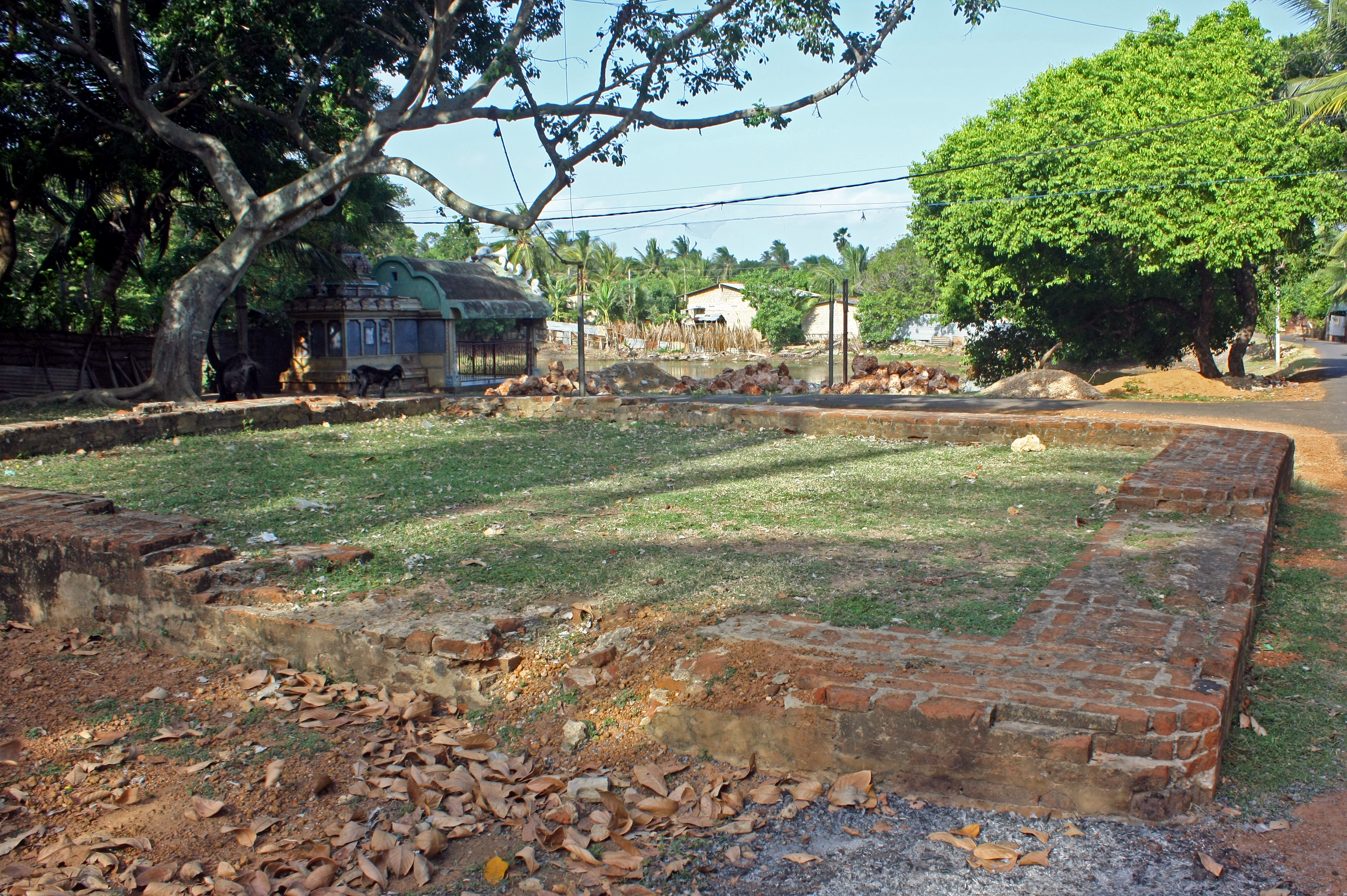
Ruins of the foundation of the Cankilian Thoppu, which is away from the current Cankilian Thoppu, and considered as another facade of the palace.

The construction of the Royal Palace has been ordered by Cinkai Ariyan Cekaracacekaran. But, another source says the palace and a flower garden was built by a Tamil king named Koolanghai in 104 AD.

There were two main roadways and four temples at the four gateways that have now been destroyed. The rebuilt temples that exist now do not match their original locations which instead are occupied by churches erected by the Portuguese. The center of the city was Muthirai Santhai (market place) and was surrounded by a square fortification around it. There were courtly buildings for the kings, Brahmin priests, soldiers and other service providers in the palace premises. The old Nallur Kandaswamy temple functioned as a defensive fort with high walls. In general, the palace and the city was laid out like the traditional temple towns in South India.

== Destruction ==
The Jaffna Palace was significantly damaged during the Portuguese conquest of the Jaffna kingdom. The fall of Cankili II, the last of the ruling dynasty at the hands of a 5,000 men-strong Portuguese invaders inevitably meant the fall of the Jaffna throne.

Over the next 40 years, the Portuguese destroyed Hindu temples in the region, the royal repository of all literary output of the kingdom. Yamuna Eri, Cankili Thoppu archway, Ruins of the foundation of the Cankilian Thoppu and Mantri Manai are few of the only remaining parts of the palace apart from several small monuments that dot the compound.

== Gallery ==
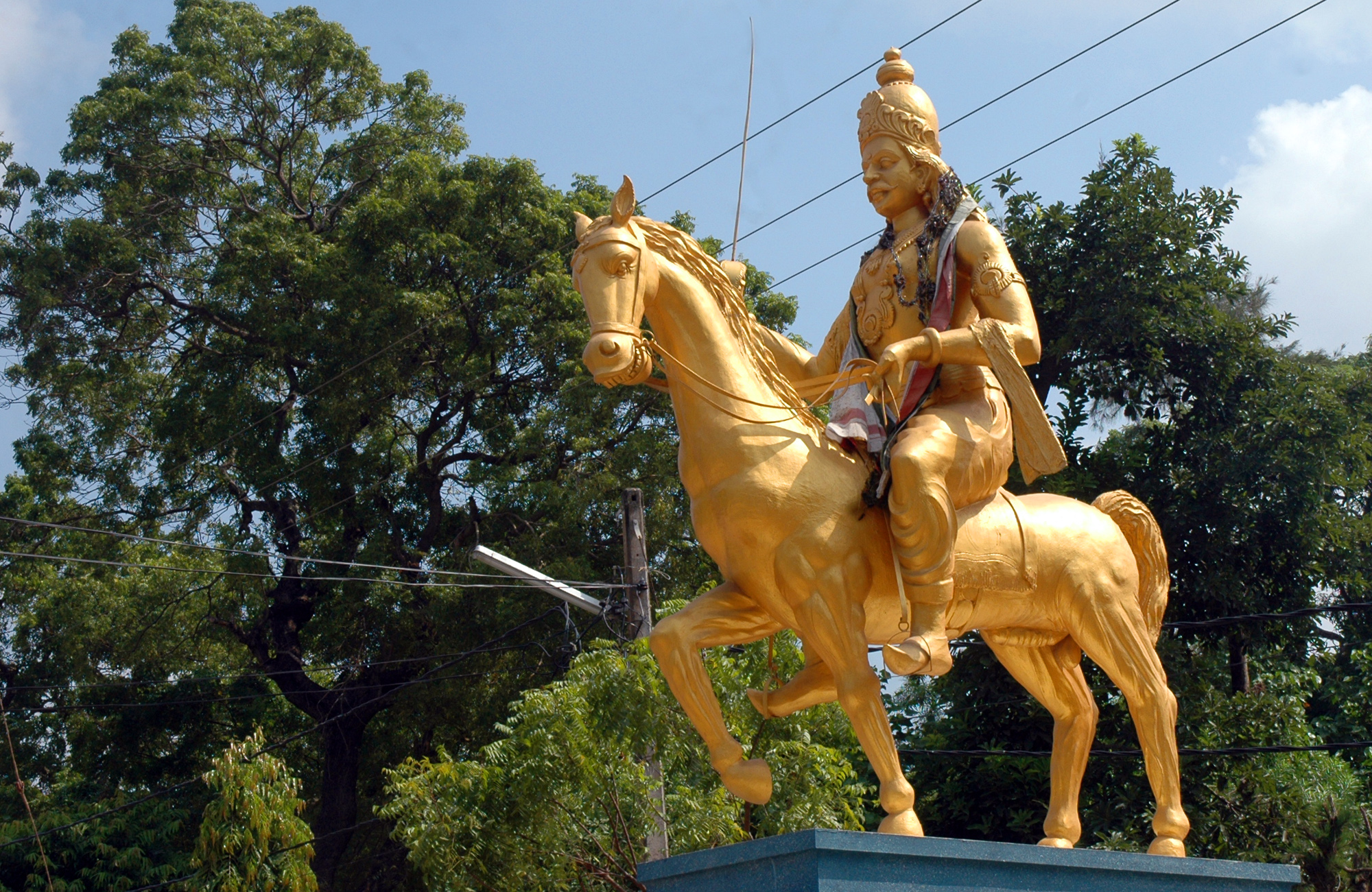
Sangiliyan Statue

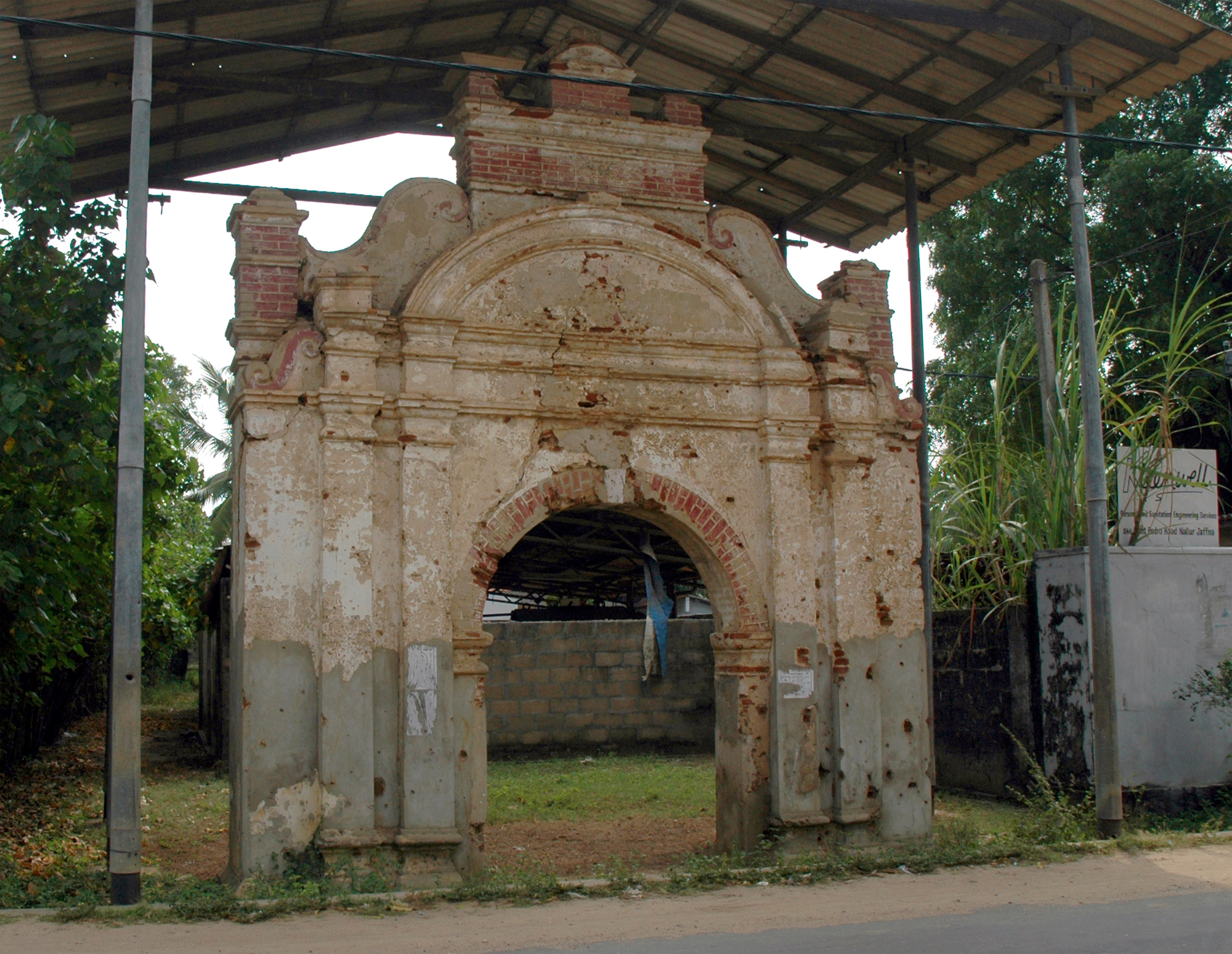
Cankili Thopu, facade of the palace

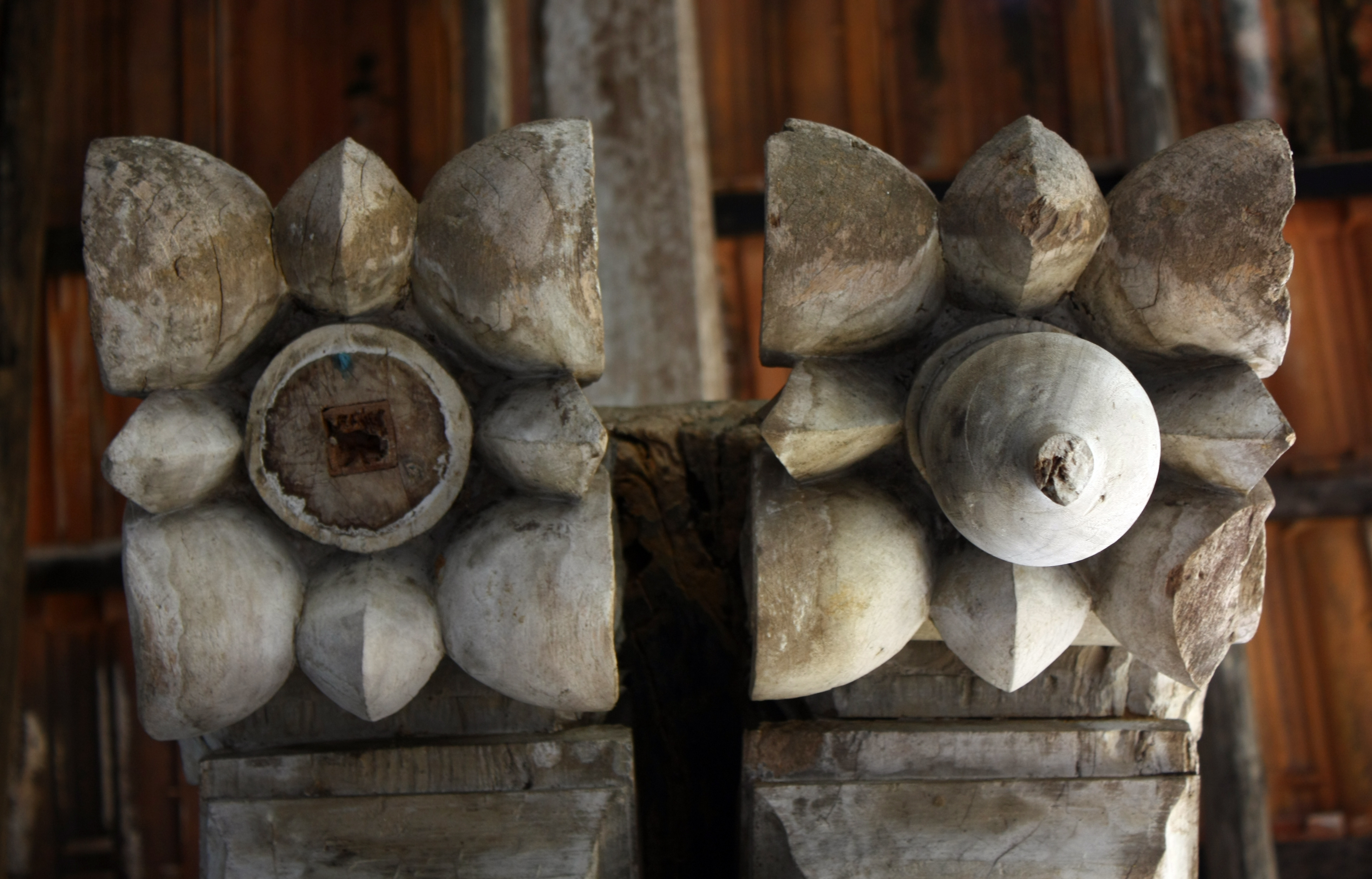
Wood carving at Mantri Manai

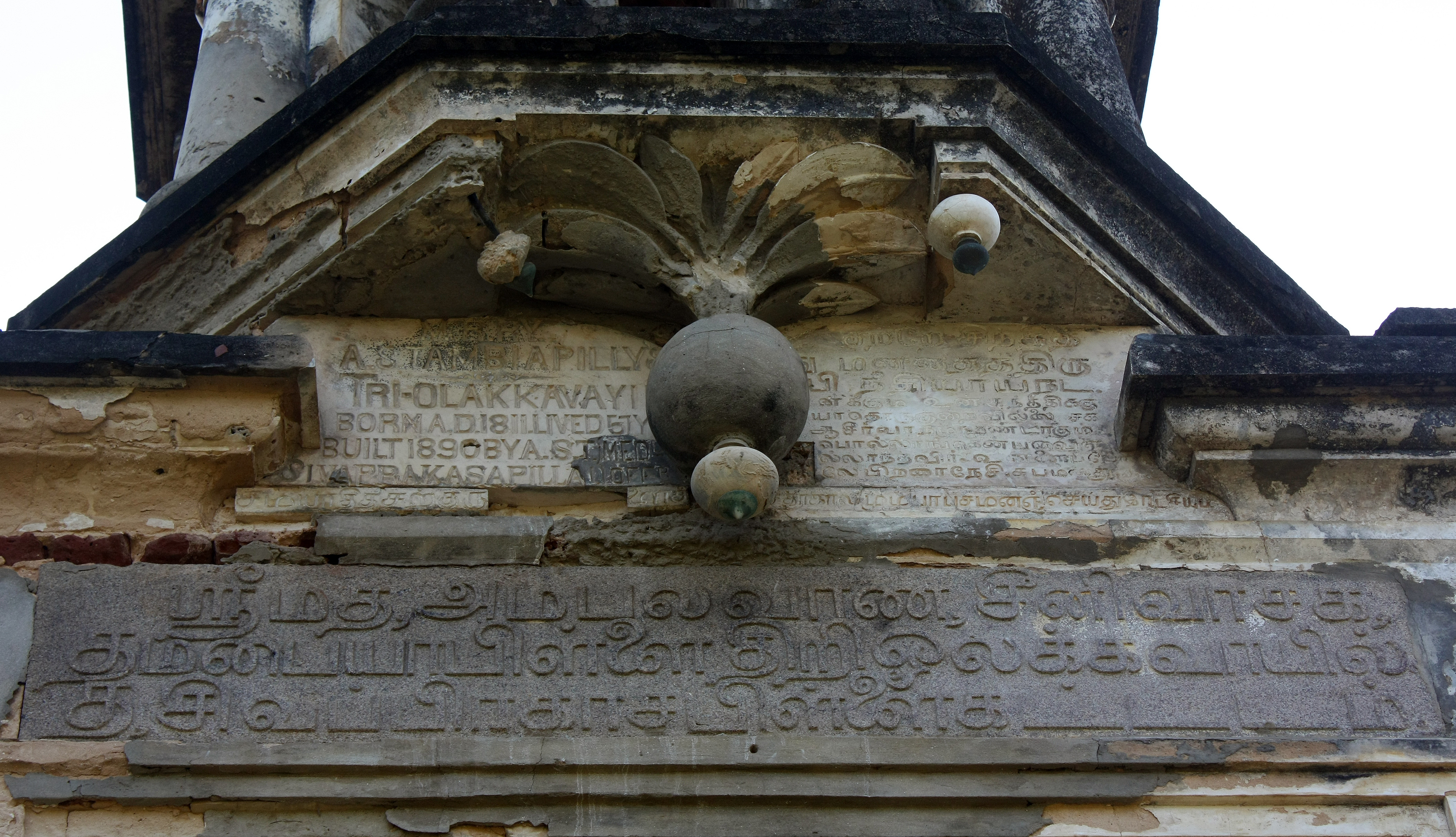
Front top

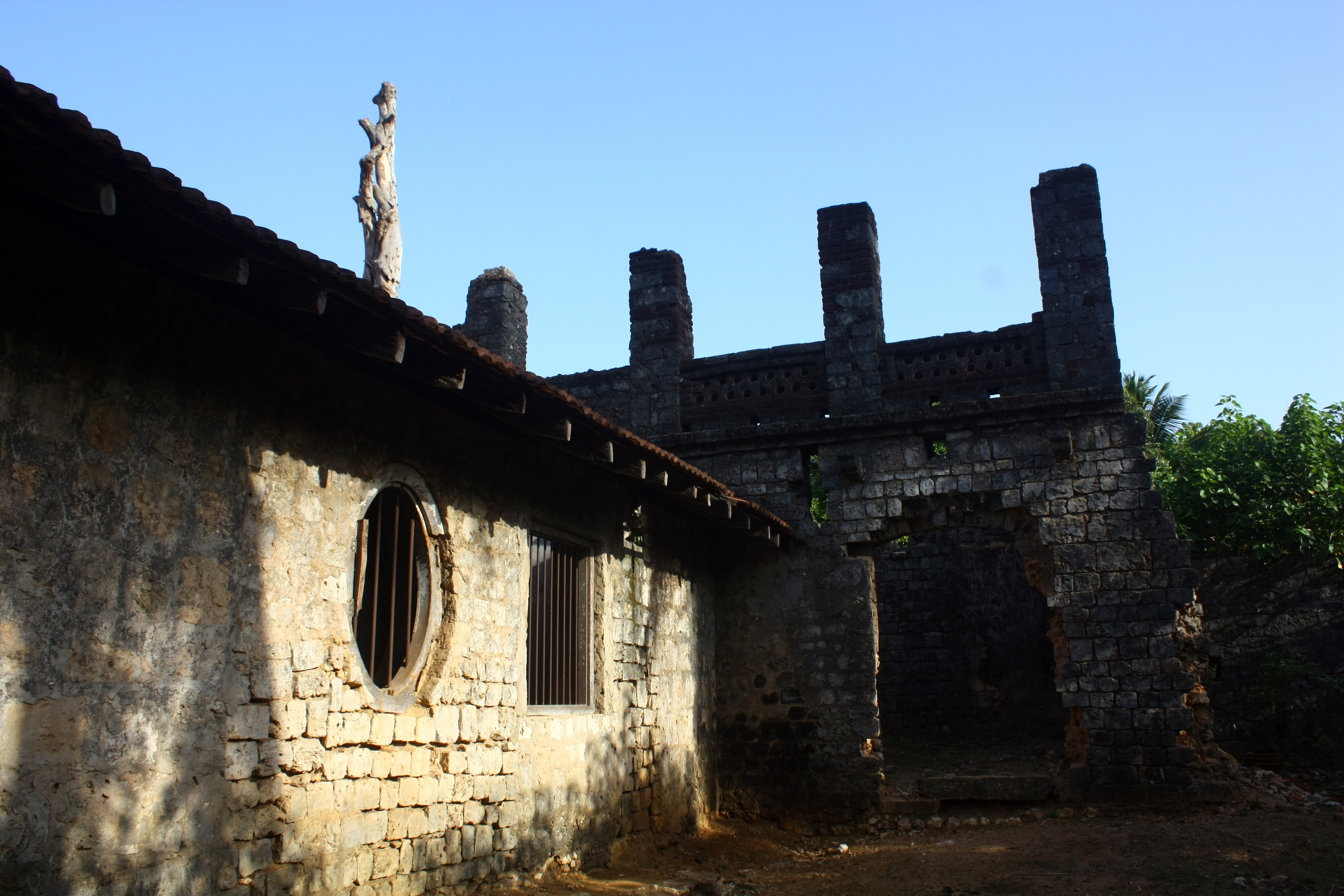
Rear side

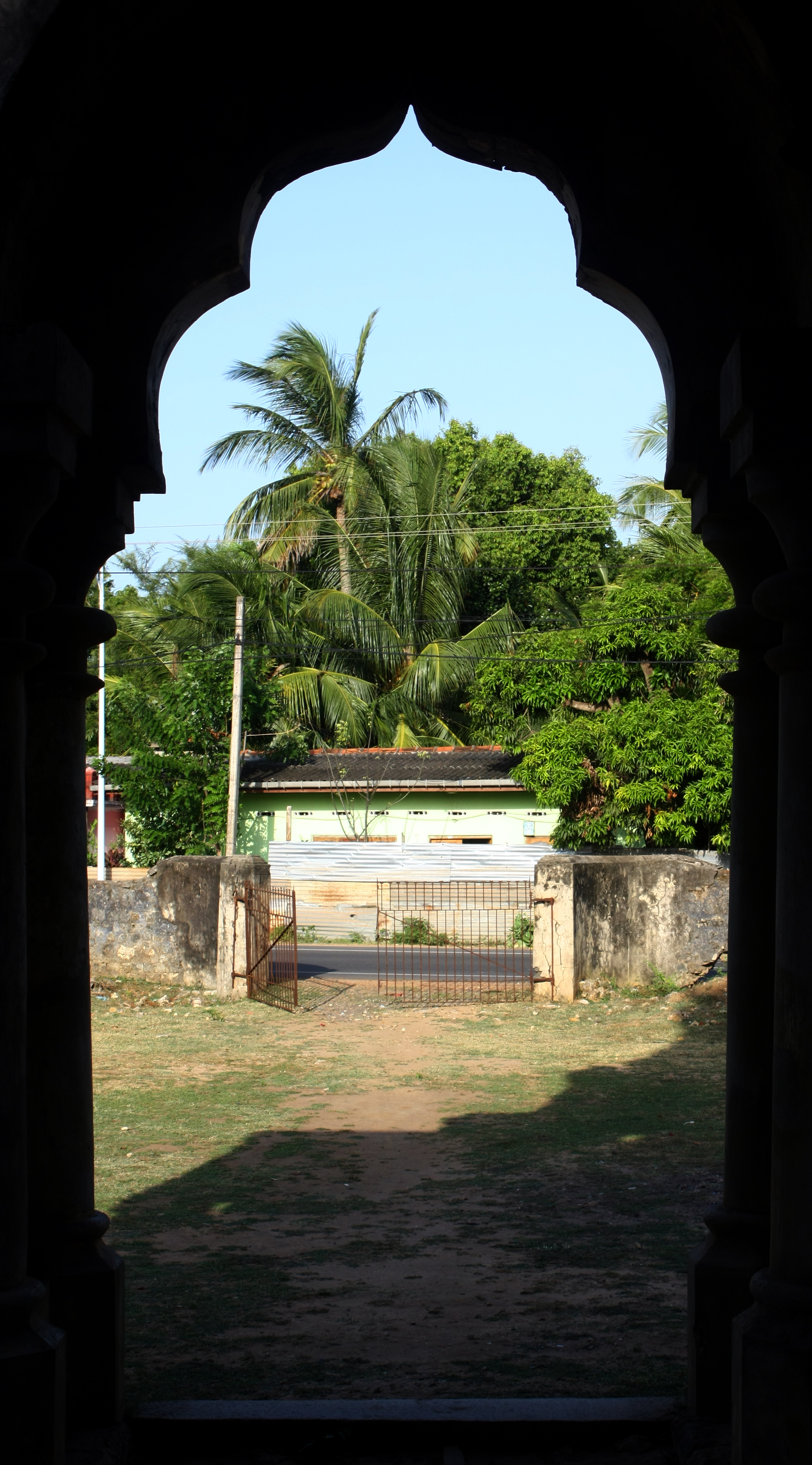
Indoor, silhouette of the entrance

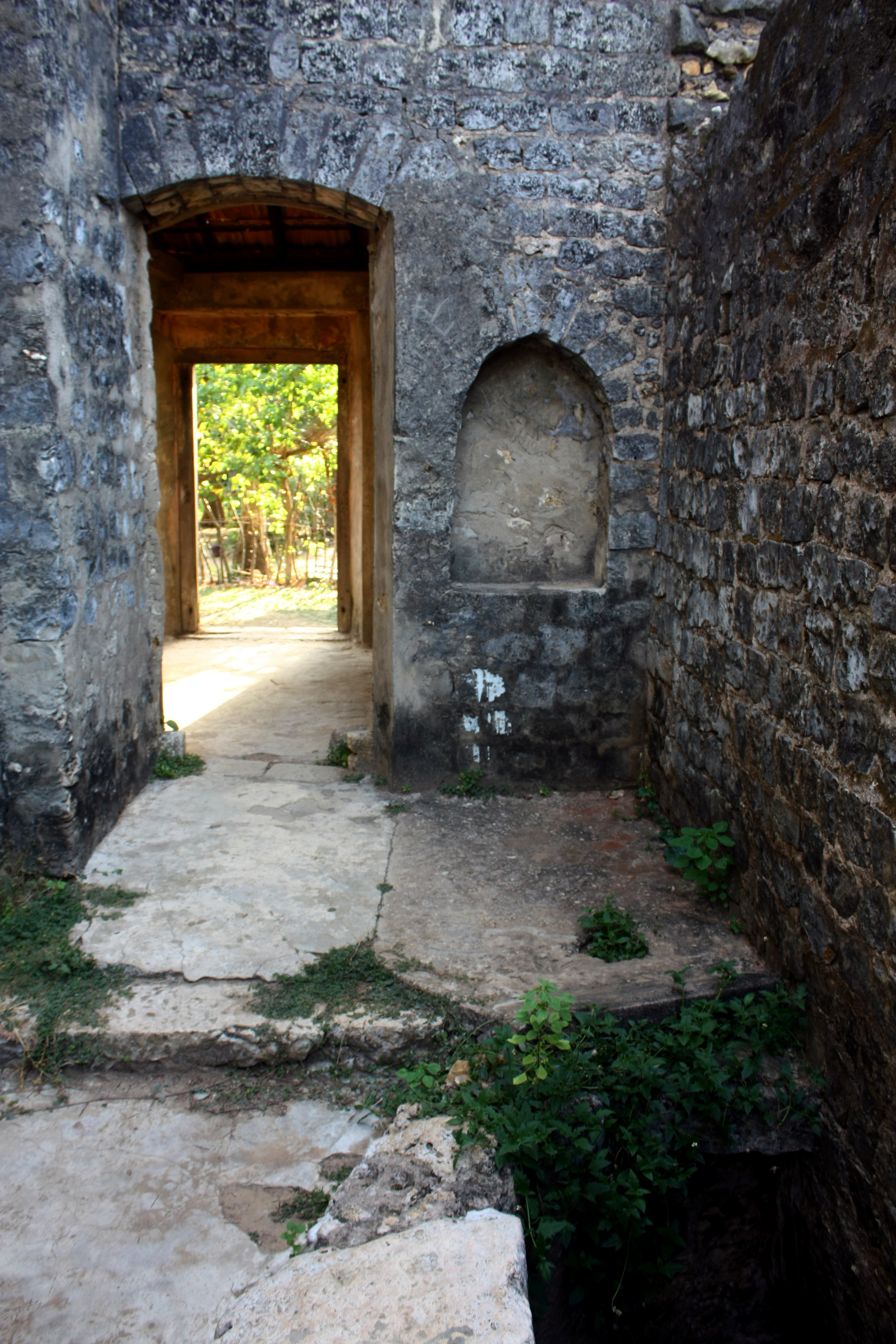
Inside, rear entrance and well
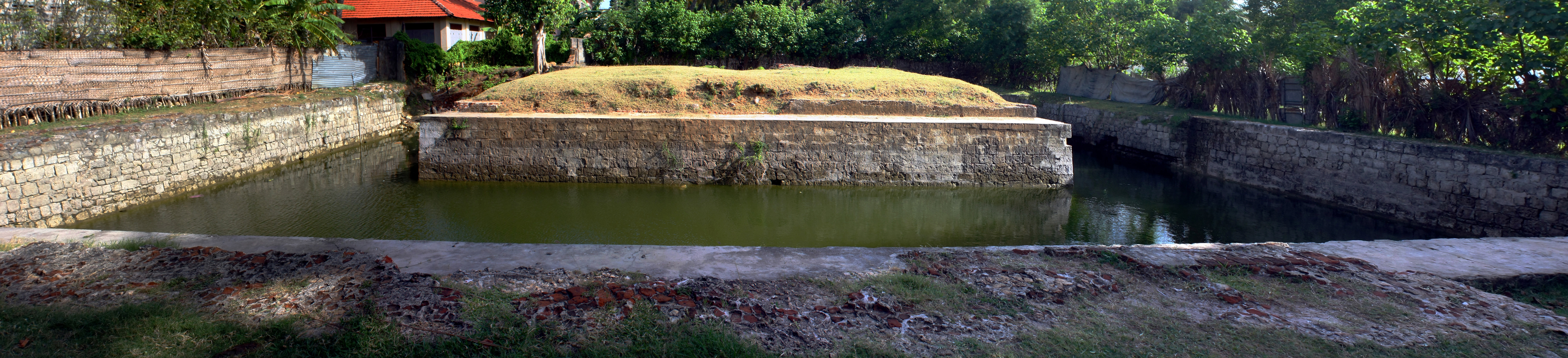
Π-shaped Yamuna Eri
