= V. S. Thurairajah =

Sri Lankan Tamil architect

V. S. Thurairajah FRIBA
- வி. எஸ். துரைராஜா
- Born: 8 August 1927
- Died: 14 December 2011 (aged 84); Sydney, Australia
- Education: Sir J. J. School of Art; Architectural Association School of Architecture
- Occupation: Architect

Velupillai Suppiah Thurairajah (Tamil: வேலுப்பிள்ளை சுப்பையா துரைராஜா, romanized: Vēluppiḷḷai Cuppaiyā Turairājā; 8 August 1927 – 14 December 2011) was a Sri Lankan Tamil architect who designed many buildings in Sri Lanka and abroad.

== Early life and family ==
Thurairajah was born on 8 August 1927. He was the son of Vellupillai Suppiah and Thangacchimuttu from Navaly in northern Ceylon. He was educated at Green Memorial School, Manipay and Manipay Hindu College. After school Thurairajah joined the Sir J. J. School of Art in Bombay in 1948, graduating in 1951 with a diploma in architecture.

Thurairajah married Selvaranee (Rani), daughter of T. Thirunavukarasu. They had a son (Surendran) and three daughters (Vathsala, Manjula and Sashikala).

== Career ==
After returning to Ceylon Thurairajah joined the Public Works Department (PWD) in 1951 as a junior architect. He then joined the Architectural Association School of Architecture in London in 1954 as a Colombo Plan scholar, graduating in 1957 with a A.A. diploma specialising in tropical architecture. He then resumed his career at the PWD before retiring in 1964 in due to government policies.

After retirement Thurairajah started a private practice known as Thurairajah Associates in 1964. The practice grew and in 1968 a branch office was opened in Jaffna. Thurairajah designed many of the tropical modernist buildings in Jaffna. During a long career Thurairajah designed numerous buildings including factories, Hindu temples, hospitals, hotels, office buildings, residential buildings and university buildings in Sri Lanka, India, Australia and Middle East.

Thurairajah was a fellow of the Royal Institute of British Architects (1967), Australian Institute of Architects (1989), Indian Institute of Architects (1965), Sri Lanka Institute of Architects (1976) and Chartered Institute of Arbitrators (1968). He was editor and publisher of a quarterly journal called Architecture and Arts in Sri Lanka from 1975 to 1981. He was chairman of Eelanadu, a Tamil language newspaper, in 1975 and one of the secretaries of the International Association of Tamil Research. Thurairajah was one of the key organisers of the 4th International Tamil Research Conference held in Jaffna in 1974. He was deputy district governor of the Lions International Sri Lanka District in 1981 and secretary of the Ananda Coomaraswamy Cultural Society. Thurairajah produced the Tamil language film Kuthu Vilakku (Sacred Lamp) in 1972.

Thurairajah migrated to Australia. He died on 14 December 2011 in Sydney, Australia.

== Works ==
Thurairajah's numerous work include:

Banks

- Bank of Ceylon, Hambantota
- Bank of Ceylon, Moratuwa
- Bank of Ceylon, Vavuniya
- Co-operative Bank, Jaffna
- Co-operative Bank, Mannar (1978)
- Co-operative Bank, Paranthan

Factories

- Ajantha Textile Factory, Ratmalana
- Baxon Textile Factory, Ratmalana
- Busalwatha Pharmaceutical Factory, Busalwatha
- Ceylon Synthetic Mills, Colombo
- Ceylon Tin Factory, Colombo
- Favourites Textile Factory, Ratmalana (1972)
- Modern Confectionery Works, Colombo
- Nagindas Textile Factory, Ratmalana
- Paragons Textile Factory, Ratmalana
- St. Anthony's PVC Factory, Colombo
- Uswatha Confectionery Factory, Ratmalana
- Visaka Textile Factory, Ratmalana

Hindu temples

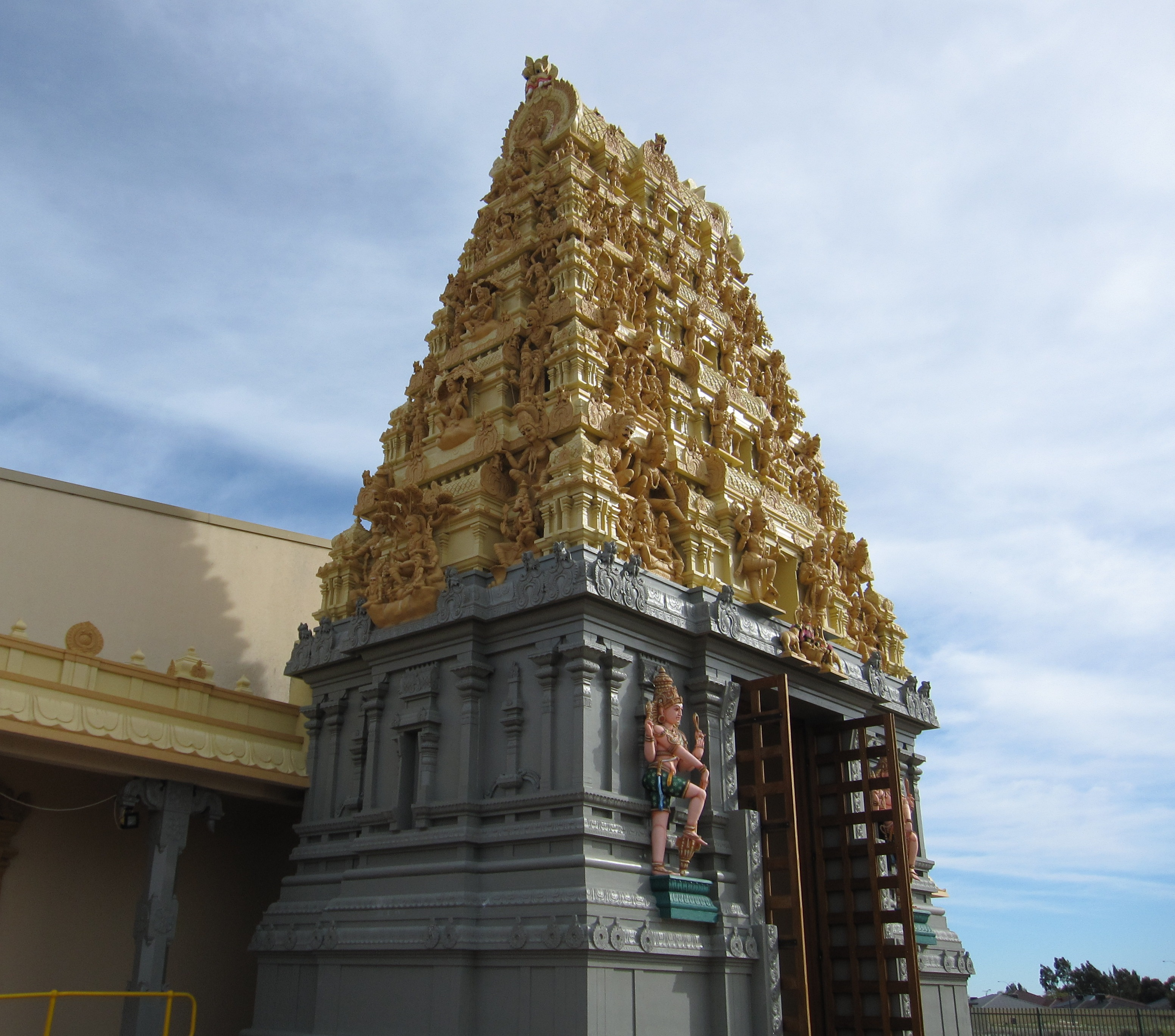
Perth Sivan Temple

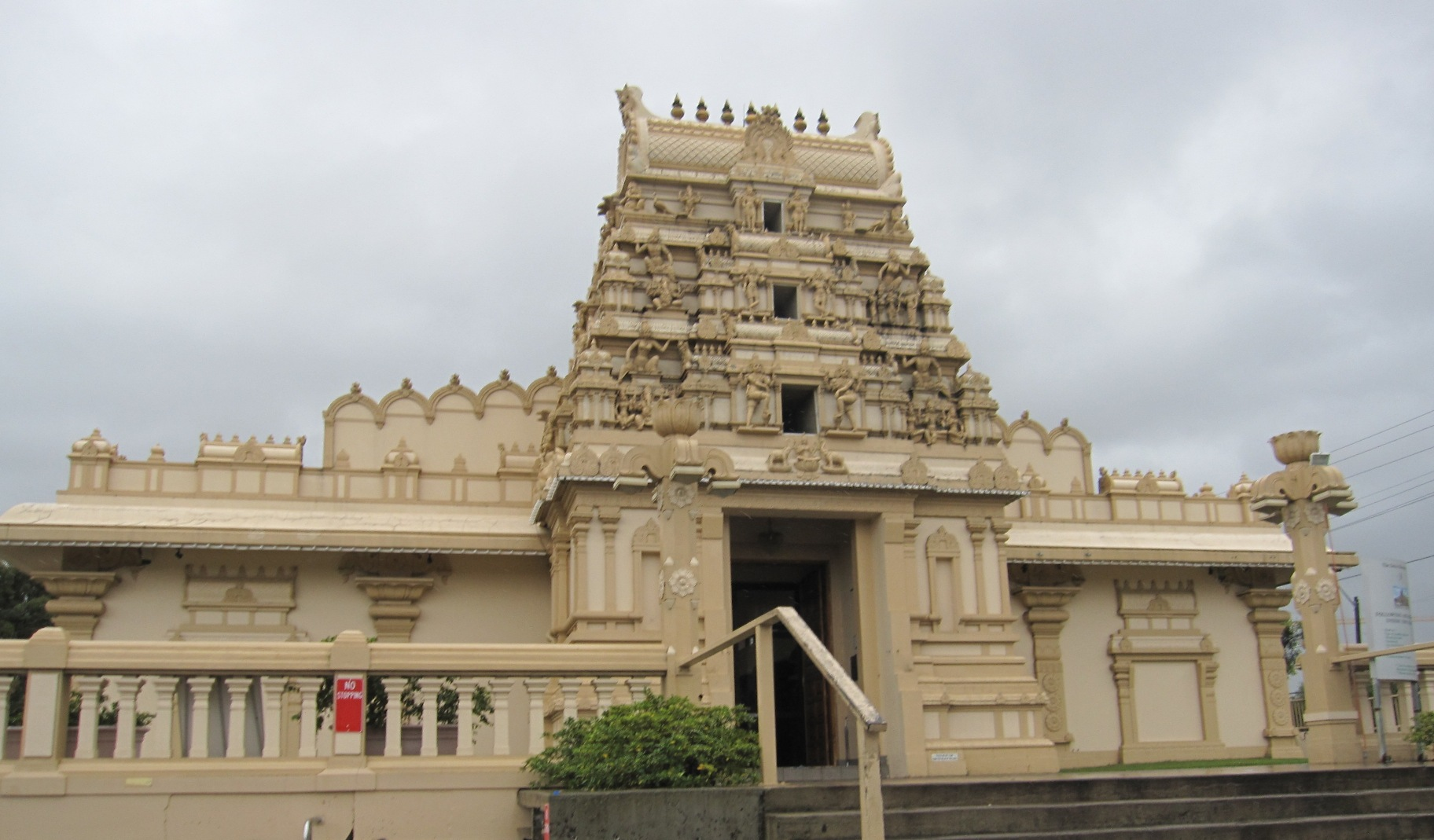
Sydney Murugan Temple

- Galle Hindu Temple, Galle (gopuram)
- New Kathiresan Temple, Colombo (1982)
- Old Kathiresan Temple, Colombo
- Perth Sivan Temple, Perth, Australia.
- Ramboda Hanuman Temple, Ramboda
- Sri Ponnambalavaneswarar Temple, Colombo (gopuram)
- Sydney Murugan Temple, Sydney, Australia (1998)

Hospitals

- Gampaha Base Hospital, Gampaha (2001)
- Kandy General Hospital, Kandy (cardiothoracic building) (2000)
- Kandy General Hospital, Kandy (surgical building)
- National Hospital of Sri Lanka, Colombo (cardiology building) (1997)
- Negombo Base Hospital, Negombo (2001)
- Tissamaharama Hospital, Tissamaharama

Hotels

- Brighton Hotel, Colombo
- Hindu Pilgrims' Rest, Kataragama
- Holiday Inn, Colombo (1980)
- Hotel Amali Nivas, Polonnaruwa
- Sapphire Hotel, Colombo (1968)
- Subhas Hotel, Jaffna

Office buildings

- All Ceylon Hindu Congress Building, Colombo (1982)
- Batticaloa DIG's Office, Batticaloa (1980)
- Ceylon Printers Building, Colombo
- Eye Donation Society Headquarters, Colombo (1983)
- Government Clerical Services Union Building, Colombo (1966)
- Jaffna DIG's Office, Jaffna
- Matara Merchants Building, Matara
- Naleem's Building, Colombo
- Northern Division Cooperative Federation Building, Jaffna

Residential buildings

- Batticaloa Housing Scheme, Batticaloa
- Dubai Housing Scheme, Dubai, United Arab Emirates
- Kubrah, Colombo
- Leedons Apartments, Colombo (1980)
- Nugegoda Housing Development, Nugegoda
- Siffani Flats, Colombo
- VST Buildings, Colombo (1969)

University buildings

- Ramanathan Academy of Fine Arts, Maruthanarmadam
- University of Colombo, Colombo (administration building)
- University of Jaffna, Jaffna (mathematics and computer science building)
- University of Jaffna, Jaffna (faculty of medicine)
- University of Jaffna, Jaffna (faculty of science)

Others

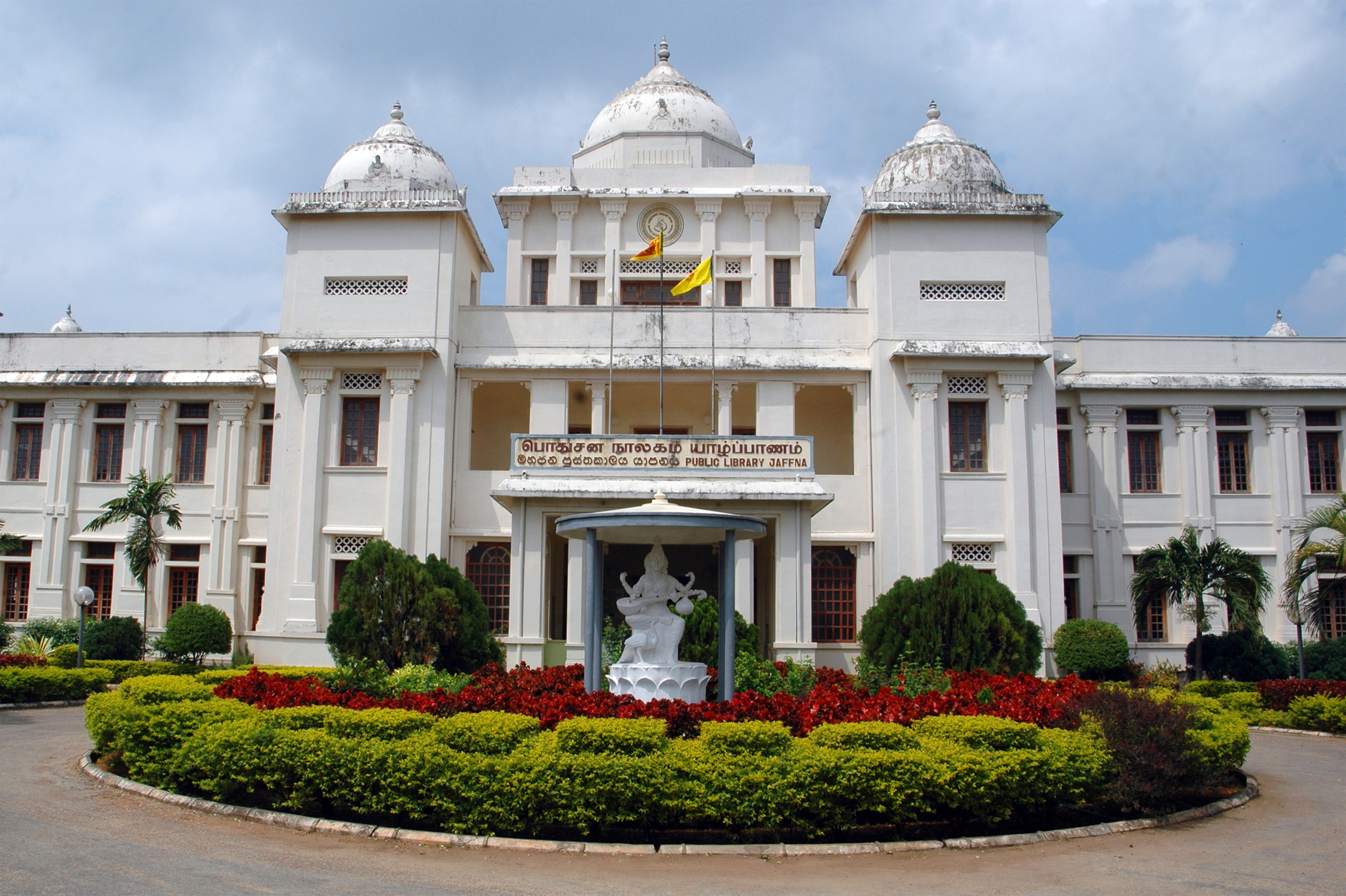
Jaffna Public Library

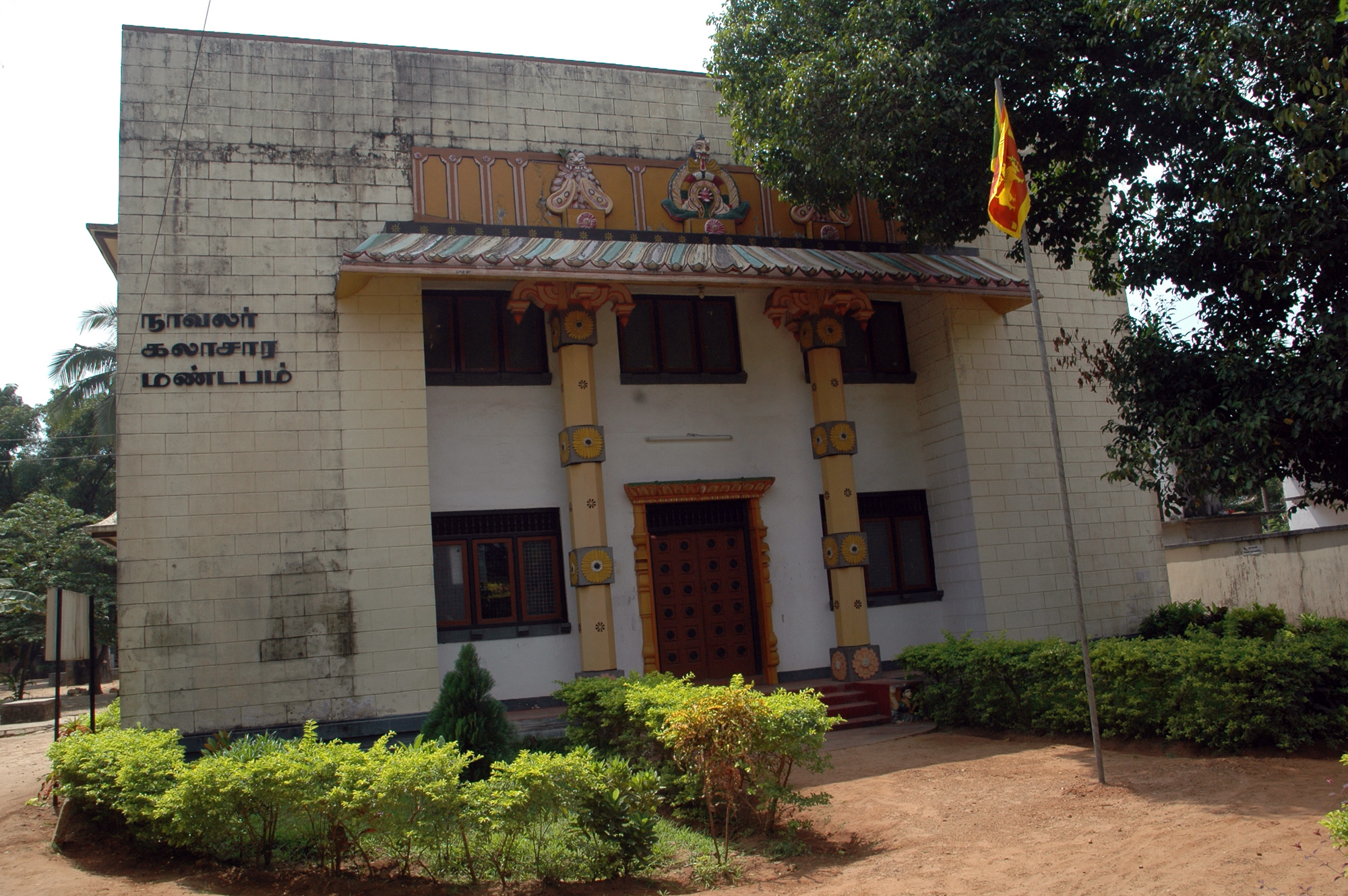
Navalar Cultural Hall

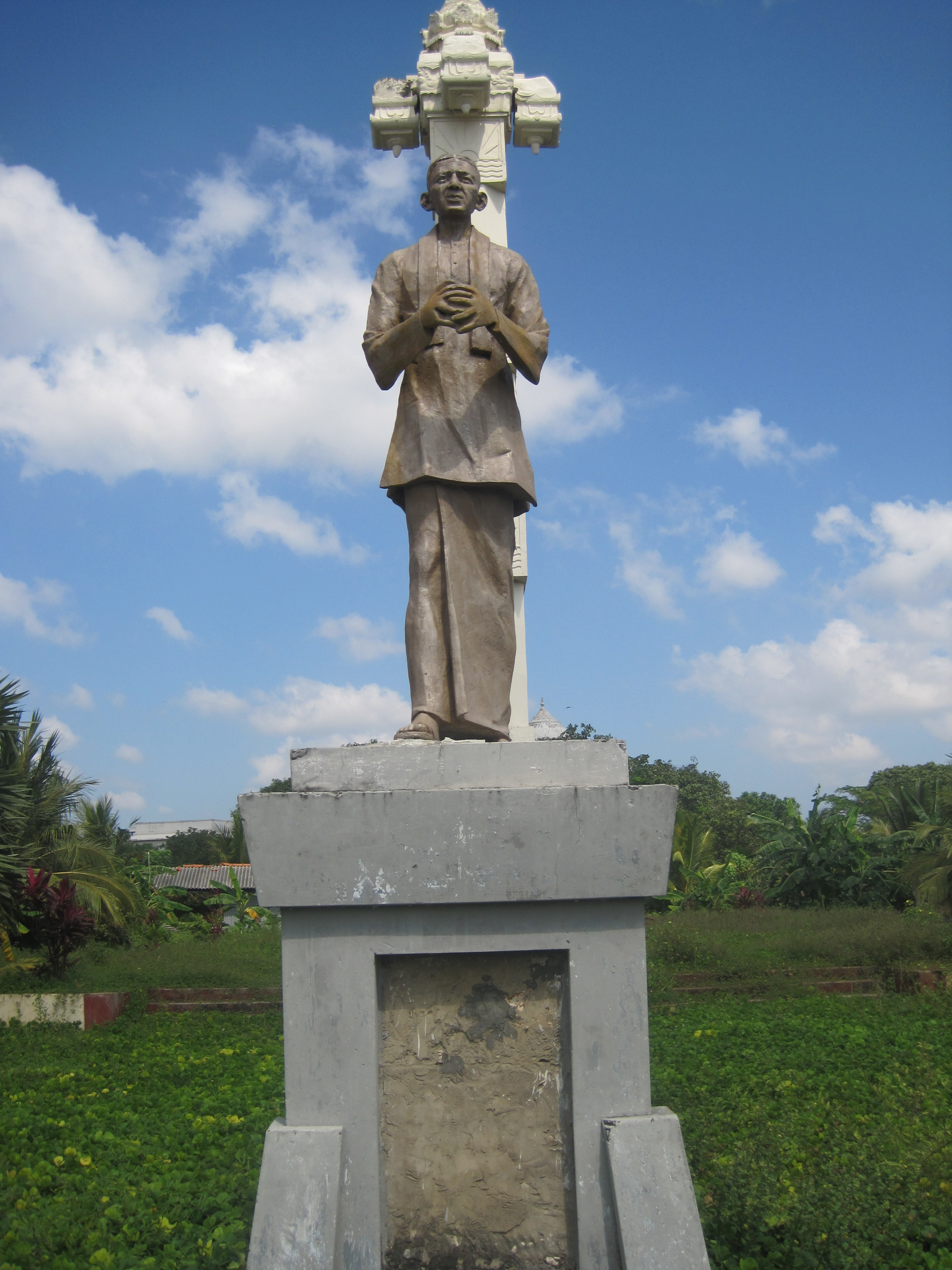
S. J. V. Chelvanayakam memorial

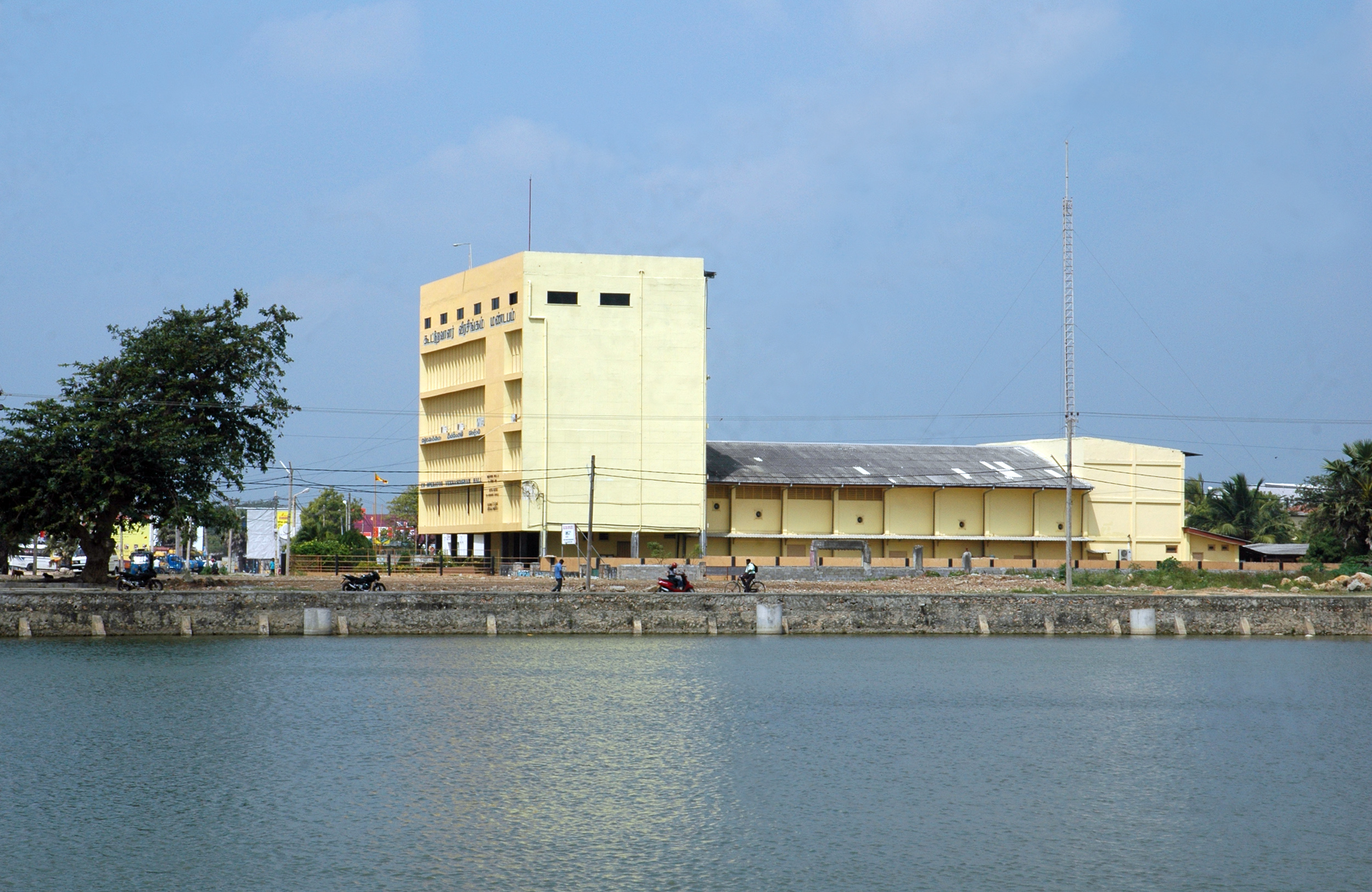
Veerasingam Hall

- Anti-malaria Campaign Building, Narahenpita (2000)
- Army Buddhist Temple, Panagoda
- Batticaloa Market, Batticaloa
- CMS Girls College, Jaffna
- Duraiappah Stadium, Jaffna
- Farm, Mankulam
- Girls' Hostel, Colombo
- Jaffna Market, Jaffna
- Jaffna Public Library, Jaffna (second stage) (2001)
- Kathiresan Hall, Colombo
- Luxmi Cinema, Ratnapura
- Nava Cinema, Colombo
- Navalar Cultural Hall, Jaffna
- Ramakrishna Mission Library, Colombo (1985)
- Rio Cinema, Colombo
- S. J. V. Chelvanayakam memorial, Jaffna (1982)
- Vaddukoddai Technical College, Vaddukoddai
- Veerasingam Hall, Jaffna
- Vipulanandar School of Music and Dance, Batticaloa
- Vivekananda Hall, Colombo
