= Vannarpannai Vaitheeswaran Temple =

Hindu temple in Sri Lanka

- வண்ணார்பண்ணை வைத்தீஸ்வரன் கோயில்
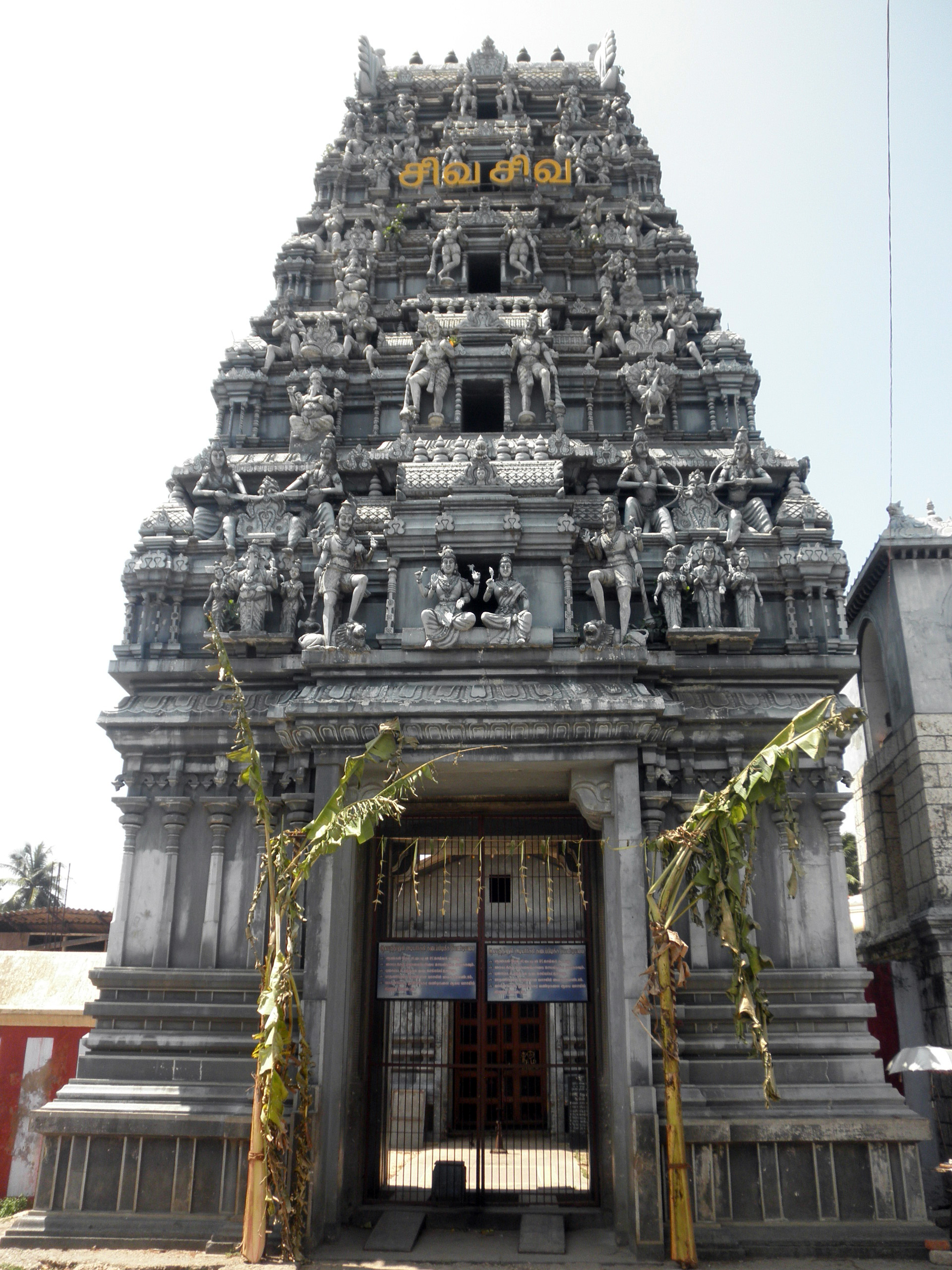
- Temple entrance

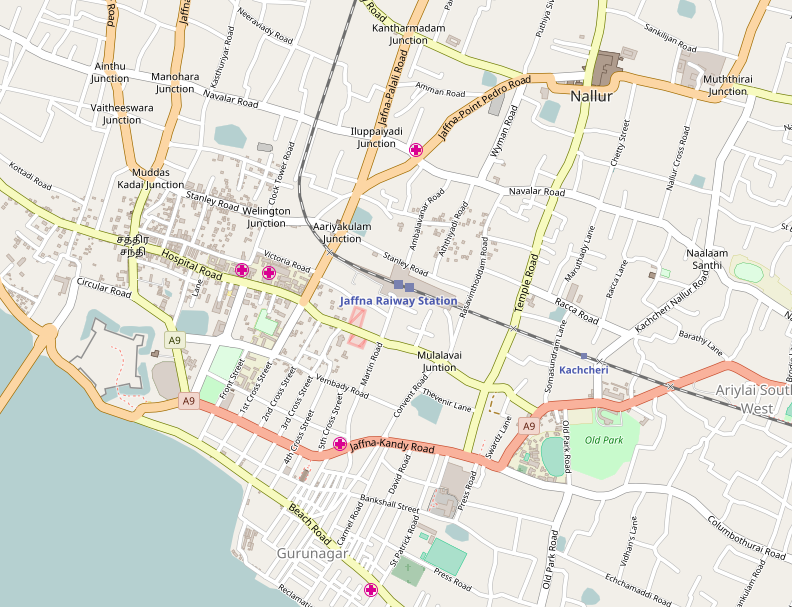
- Location in central Jaffna

Religion
- Affiliation: Hinduism
- District: Jaffna District
- Deity: Shiva

Location
- Location: Vannarpannai
- State: Northern Province
- Country: Sri Lanka
- Interactive map of Vannarpannai Vaitheeswaran Temple
- Coordinates: 09°40′17.50″N 80°00′36.90″E

Architecture
- Type: Dravidian architecture
- Archaeological Protected Monument of Sri Lanka
- Designated: 30.12.2011

Vannarpannai Vaitheeswaran Temple (Tamil: வண்ணார்பண்ணை வைத்தீஸ்வரன் கோயில், romanized: Vaṇṇārpaṇṇai Vaittīsvaraṉ Kōyil) is a Hindu temple in Vannarpannai, Jaffna in northern Sri Lanka. It was built by Vaithilingam Chettiar a business man during the Dutch colonial period. The temple was declared an archaeological protected monument in December 2011.
