= Delft Divisional Secretariat =

- Divisional Secretariat
- Country: Sri Lanka
- Province: Northern Province
- District: Jaffna District
- Time zone: UTC+5:30 (Sri Lanka Standard Time)

Delft Divisional Secretariat is a Divisional Secretariat of Jaffna District, of Northern Province, Sri Lanka.

== Demography-Religion ==
Religion in Delft DS Division (2012)
1. Buddhist (1.00%)
2. Hindu (37.6%)
3. Muslim (0.00%)
4. Roman Catholic (54.3%)
5. Other Christian (7.00%)
6. Other (0.00%)
