= Island South Divisional Secretariat =

- Divisional Secretariat
- Interactive map of Island South Divisional Secretariat
- Country: Sri Lanka
- Province: Northern Province
- District: Jaffna District
- Time zone: UTC+5:30 (Sri Lanka Standard Time)

Island South Divisional Secretariat is a Divisional Secretariat of Jaffna District, of Northern Province, Sri Lanka.

== Demography-Religion ==
Religion in Island South DS Division (2012)
1. Buddhist (0.40%)
2. Hindu (75.2%)
3. Muslim (0.90%)
4. Roman Catholic (21.6%)
5. Other Christian (1.60%)
6. Other (0.30%)
