= Nallur Divisional Secretariat =

- Divisional Secretariat
- Location within Sri Lanka
- Country: Sri Lanka
- Province: Northern Province
- District: Jaffna District
- Time zone: UTC+5:30 (Sri Lanka Standard Time)

Nallur Divisional Secretariat is a Divisional administrative unit of the Jaffna District in the Northern Province of Sri Lanka.

== Demography-Religion ==
Religion in Nallur DS Division (2012)
1. Buddhist (0.40%)
2. Hindu (90.4%)
3. Muslim (0.10%)
4. Roman Catholic (5.10%)
5. Other Christian (4.00%)
6. Other (0.00%)
