= Cankilian Thoppu =

- சங்கிலித்தோப்பு
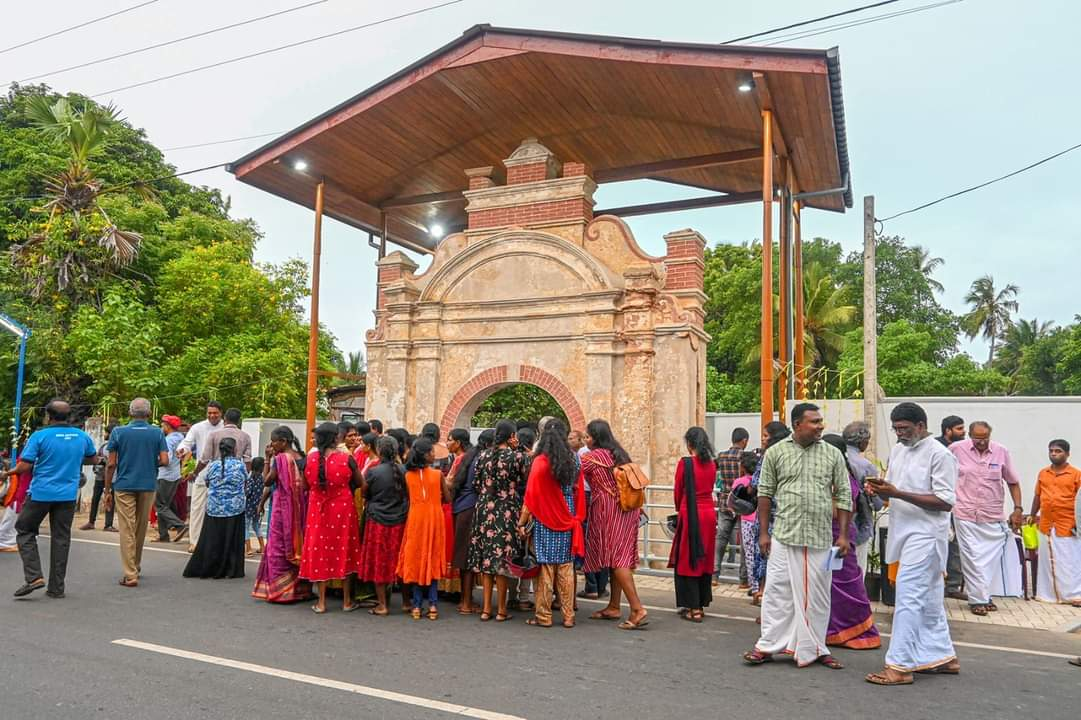
- Cankilian Thoppu or arch of Cankili

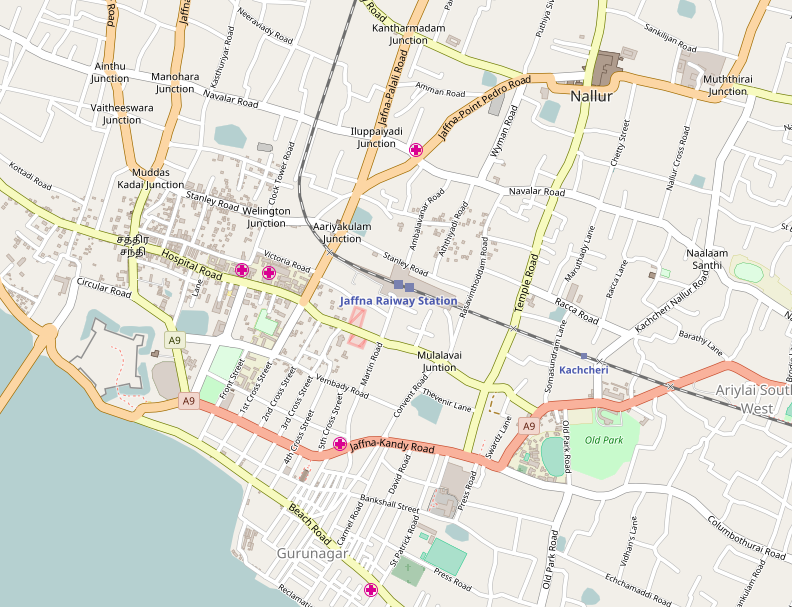
- Location within Central Jaffna
- Alternative names: Poothathamby Arch

General information
- Type: Triumphal Arch
- Location: Jaffna, Sri Lanka
- Coordinates: 9°40′34.4″N 80°02′09″E
- Owner: Sri Lankan Government

Design and construction
- Designations: Archaeological protected monument (23 February 2007)

Cankilian Thoppu facade or Poothathamby arch, simply known as Cankilian Thoppu (pronounced [Cənəgɪlɪənə ʈəɦoːbəbʉ]), is an ancient facade, and one of the remnants of the Jaffna kingdom. The arch is located on the Jaffna-Point Pedro Road, near Nallur, Jaffna. The Cankilian Thoppu is an archaeological protected monument in the Jaffna District and was listed as such by the Sri Lankan government in 2007.

It is situated close to other physical remnants of the Jaffna kingdom and is believed to be part of the facade of the king's palace, even though its architecture style is typical of Dutch colonial architecture. The Cankilian Thoppu is located within the area known as the Pandiya Palace, which supports the connection with the Tamil kings and their kingdom.

== Reconstruction ==
The Cankilian Thoppu arch was reconstructed in 2023 as a part of a larger, ongoing effort to restore Tamil heritage sites, including the Jaffna Palace ruins. The reconstruction was largely based around anastylosis, with fallen parts being used in the reassembly and the previous architecture being followed. The wall and pathway to the Cankilian Thoppu were reconstructed as well to increase public access to the site. The reconstruction was a part of the project Timeless Tamil Heritage, sponsored by Saahari & Anamitra Kugapalan of Palmyrah Initiative, in an effort to aid in cultural preservation for Tamil Sri Lankans. The reconstruction project was also sponsored by Jaffna Heritage Center, an organization based in Northern Sri Lanka.

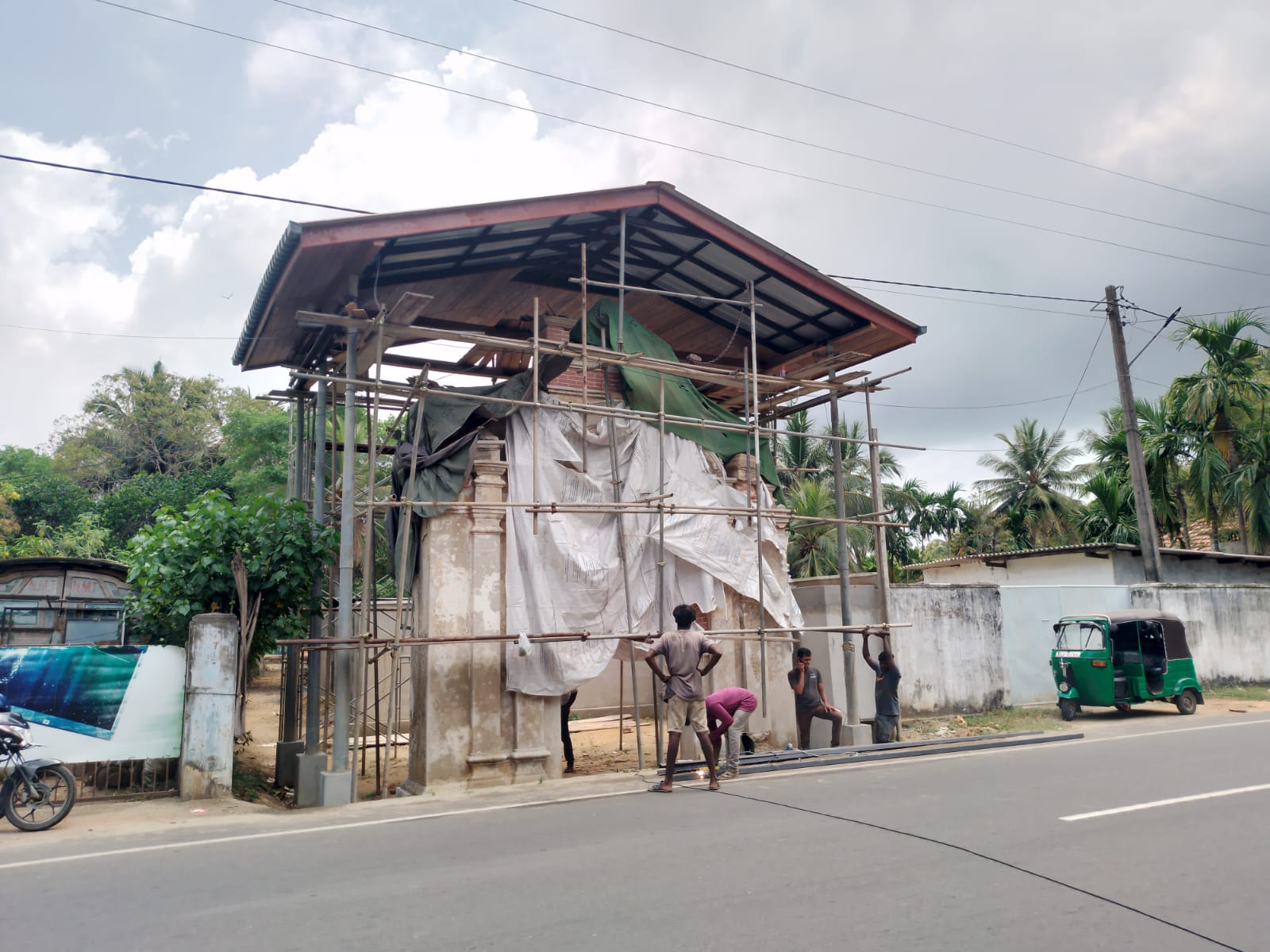
The Cankilian Thoppu during reconstruction efforts.

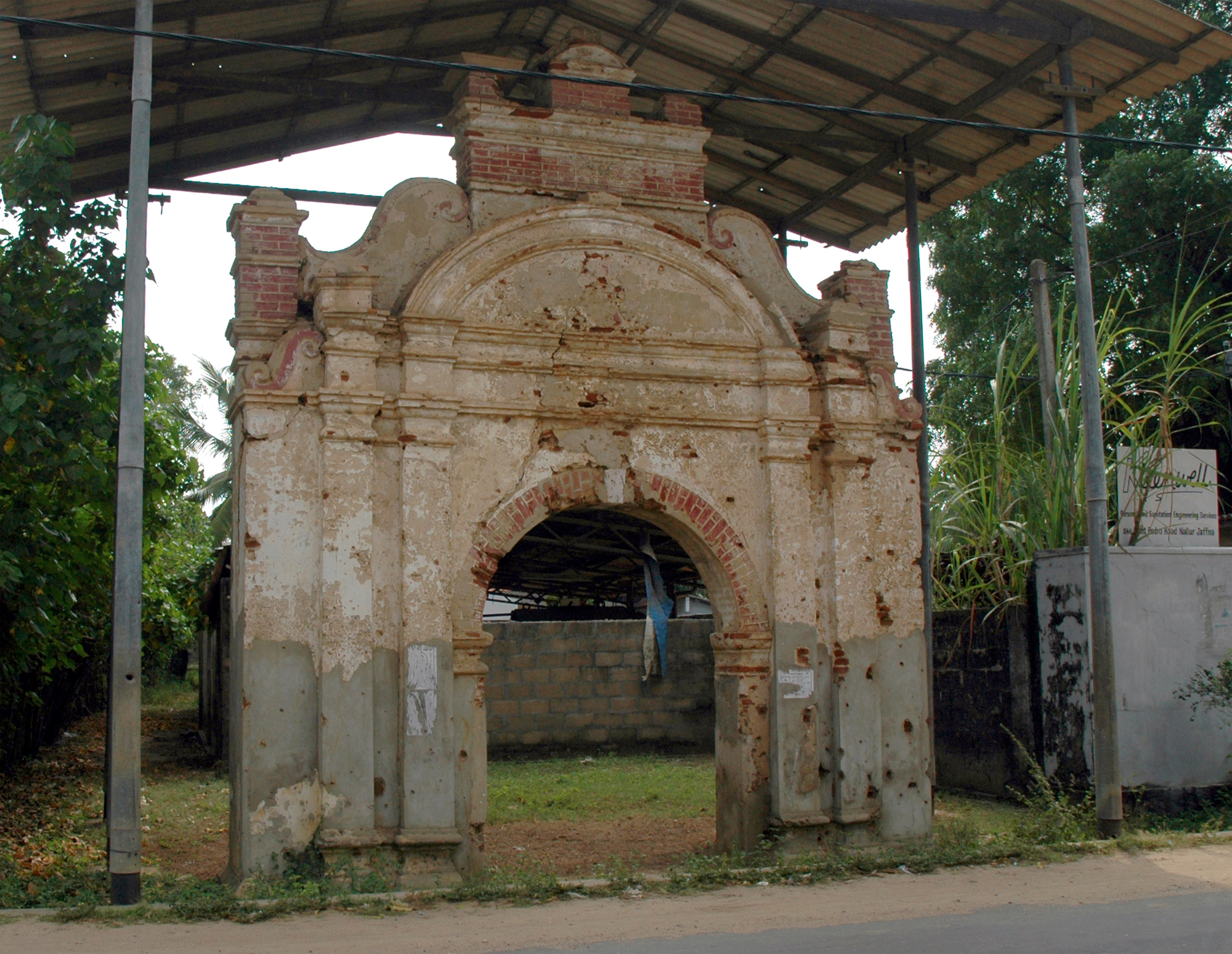
The Cankilian Thoppu before undergoing reconstruction.

== See also ==
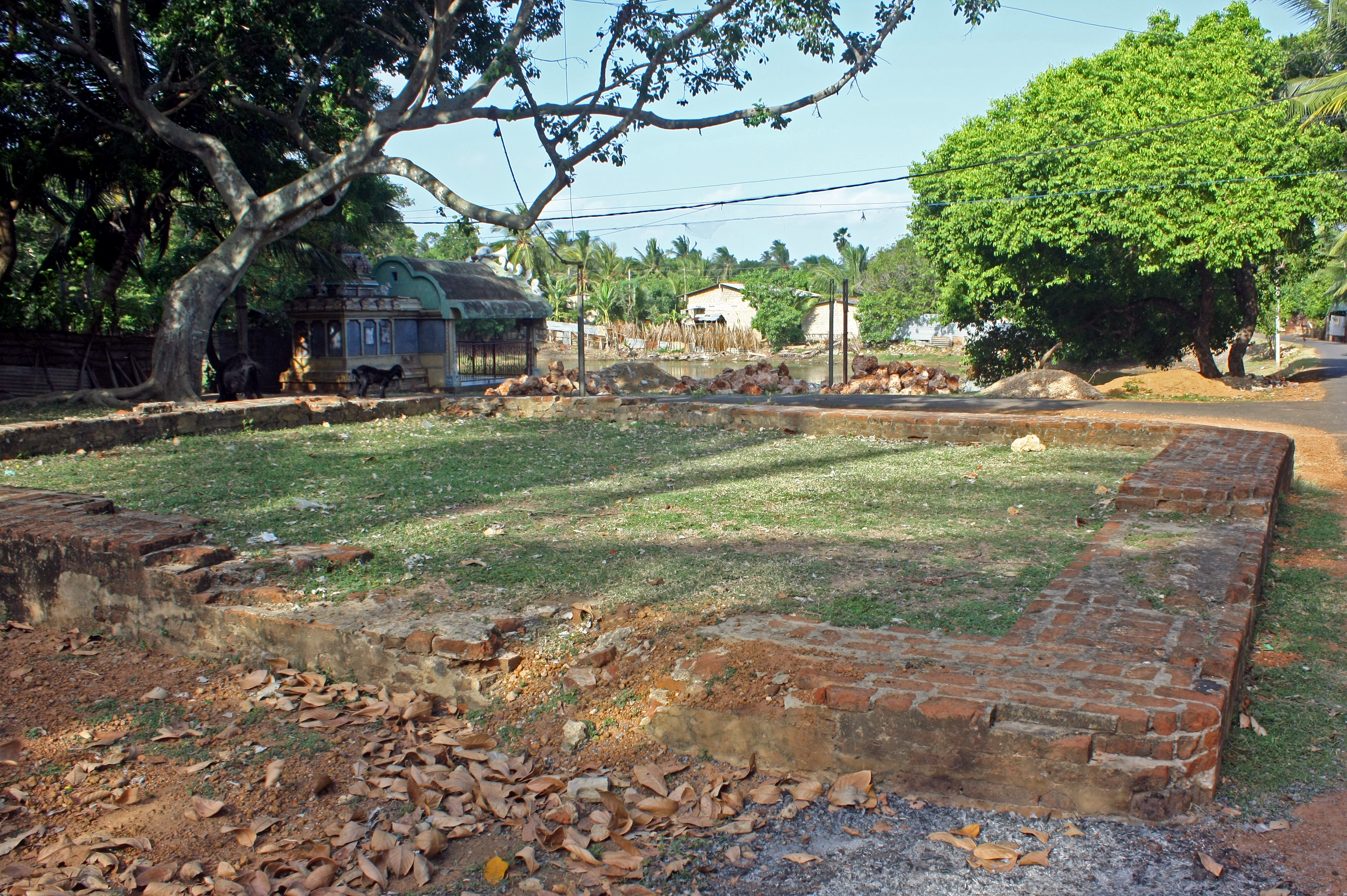
Ruins of foundation of the Cankilian Thoppu, which is away from the current Cankilian Thoppu, and considered as another facade of the palace.

- Jaffna Palace ruins
