= Subhas Hotel =

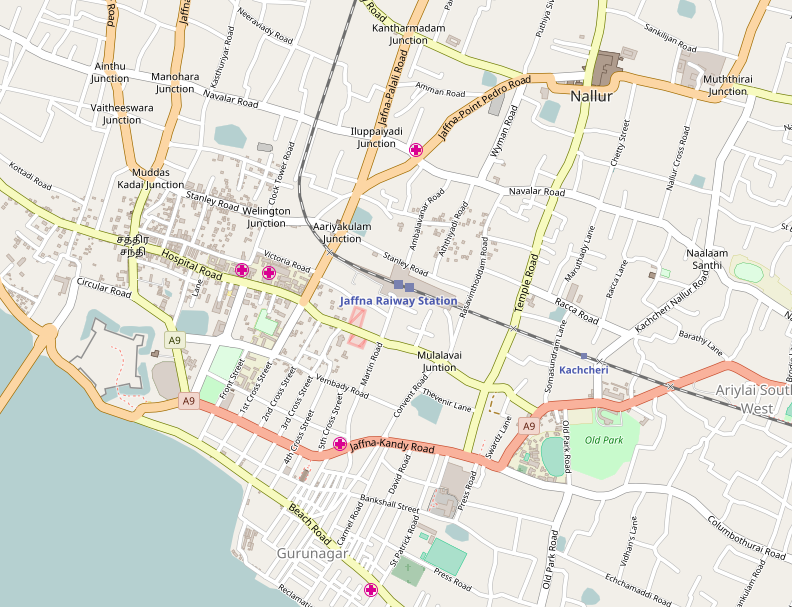
- Location within Central Jaffna
- Alternative names: Subash Hotel; Subhash Hotel

General information
- Location: 49 Victoria Road, Jaffna, Sri Lanka
- Coordinates: 9°39′59.10″N 80°0′59.90″E
- Opened: 1970
- Renovated: 14 December 2012
- Owner: Subhas Tourist Hotel (Private) Limited

Other information
- Number of rooms: 36

Website
- subhasgroup.com

Subhas Hotel (Subash Hotel, Subhash Hotel) is a hotel in the city of Jaffna in northern Sri Lanka. The 36 room hotel is located in the heart of the city on Victoria Road, opposite Jaffna Hospital. Built in 1970, the hotel had a monopoly on the Jaffna Peninsula for two decades. During the civil war the hotel was occupied by the Sri Lankan military for 16 years. The hotel was handed back to the owners in 2011 and re-opened in 2012.

== History ==
The hotel was built in 1970 by Ayappan Sangaran, an Indian who had moved to Ceylon in 1928. The hotel was named after Subhas Chandra Bose, the Indian nationalist whom Sangaran admired. Sangaran owned several businesses in the Jaffna including Subhas Café and Ice-cream which had a virtual monopoly on ice cream in the 1970s. The 30 room hotel was certified by the Ministry of Tourism and served as the only tourist hotel in the Jaffna Peninsula for two decades. 15 more rooms were added to the hotel later.

In October 1995, as the Sri Lankan military launched a military offensive to recapture the Jaffna Peninsula from the rebel Liberation Tigers of Tamil Eelam. The hotel, like many public buildings in Jaffna, became a shelter for refugees fleeing the fighting. After recapturing Jaffna the Sri Lankan military declared the centre of the city, which included Subhas Hotel, as a High Security Zone (HSZ). In December 1995 the Sri Lankan military occupied the hotel, like they did to many buildings in the city. The hotel was the headquarters of the Sri Lanka Army's 51-2 Brigade. Sangaran, who moved to India with his family, died three years after the army took over the hotel.

During the Norwegian mediated peace process the Sri Lankan military claimed it would hand the hotel back to the owners by mid-2003 but this never happened. In March 2011, two years after the civil war ended, the military handed the hotel back to the family. The refurbished hotel re-opened for business on 14 December 2012 under the management of S. Hariharan and S. Nimalaharan, Sangaran's sons and managing directors of Subhas Tourist Hotel (Private) Limited.
