= Vannarpannai =

Vannarpannai வண்ணார்பண்ணை වන්නාර්පන්නෙයි
- Suburb
- Location within Sri Lanka
- Coordinates: 9°41′0″N 80°1′0″E
- Country: Sri Lanka
- Province: Northern
- District: Jaffna
- DS Division: Jaffna

Vannarpannai (Tamil: வண்ணார்பண்ணை) is a notable suburb within the Jaffna town municipality in the northern Jaffna District in Sri Lanka. It is home to many cultural institutions that are important for the Saiva revivalism of the local Sri Lankan Tamils as initiated by Arumuga Navalar. It is home to Kathiresan Temple and Vaitheeswaran Temple in which Navalar began his circuit preaching. It is also home to schools such as Vaitheeswara Vidyalayam, Srila Sri Arumuga Navalar School and Jaffna Hindu College and the Sivaprakasa Printing Press founded in 1848. The suburb has suffered adverse effects due to the Sri Lankan civil war
