= Jaffna Divisional Secretariat =

- Divisional Secretariat
- Interactive map of Jaffna Divisional Secretariat
- Country: Sri Lanka
- Province: Northern Province
- District: Jaffna District
- Time zone: UTC+5:30 (Sri Lanka Standard Time)

Jaffna Divisional Secretariat is a Divisional Secretariat of Jaffna District, of Northern Province, Sri Lanka.

== Demography-Religion ==
Religion in Jaffna DS Division (2012)
1. Buddhist (0.30%)
2. Hindu (37.7%)
3. Muslim (3.40%)
4. Roman Catholic (52.9%)
5. Other Christian (5.70%)
6. Other (0.00%)
