= List of Archaeological Protected Monuments in Vavuniya District =

This is a list of Archaeological Protected Monuments in Vavuniya District, Sri Lanka.

Monument	Image	Location	Grama Niladhari Division	Divisional Secretary's Division	Registered	Description	Refs
Alagalla ruins		Alagalla	Alagalla	Vavuniya South	6 June 2008	Ancient chaitya and ruins	
Aluthwatta ruins		Aluthwatta	Mahakachchakodiya	Vavuniya South	6 June 2008		
Ambalangodella ruins		Ambalangodella	Madukanda	Vavuniya South	6 June 2008	Ancient chaitya	
Avaranthulawa ruins		Avaranthulawa	Pavatkulam Unit 2	Venkalacheddikulam	6 June 2008	Ancient chaitya and ruin site	
Avaranthulawa ruins		Pawakkulama	Cheddikulam	Venkalacheddikulam	23 February 2007	Two dagobas situated in forest	
Erupothana ruins		Erupothana	Mahakachchakodiya	Vavuniya South	6 June 2008	Rock caves and the ancient chaitya mound with bricks	
Galnaddumkulama Vihara		Galnaddumkulama	Alagalla	Vavuniya South	6 June 2008	Rock cave vihara with the Buddha statue	
Iratperiyakulam ruins		Iratperiyakulam	Iratperiyakulam	Vavuniya South	6 June 2008	Ancient chaitya and ruins	
Karadikkulam ruins		Karadikkulam	Puthupoolankulam	Vavuniya South	6 June 2008	Ancient chaitya and ruin site with stone pillars	
Lunuwewa (Uppukulam) ruins			Mahamailankulama	Vavuniya South	6 June 2008	Rock caves and ruins with stone bed	
Madukanda Vihara		Madukanda	Madukanda	Vavuniya South	13 July 1951		
Navagama Kiri Vehera			Iratperiyakulam	Vavuniya South	6 June 2008	Ancient chaitya and ruin site	
Omanthai ruins		Omanthai	Omanthai	Vavuniya	6 June 2008	Ancient ruins and stone pillars behind Hindu temple	
Padiveddikulam ruins		Padiveddikulam	Mahamailankulama	Vavuniya South	6 June 2008	Ruins with flight of steps on stone	
Pampaimadhu ruins		Pampaimadu	Pampaimadu	Vavuniya	6 June 2008	Ancient chaitya and ruins adjoining Hindu temple	
Pampaimadu ruins		Pampaimadu	Pampaimadu	Vavuniya	6 June 2008	Ruin site with stone pillars	
Paneynindran ruins		Paneynindran	Maraillupai	Vavuniya North	17 May 2013	Ruins with brick foundations and stone pillars in the village	
Rankethgama (Warikkuddiyoor) ruins			Pavatkulam Unit 2	Venkalacheddikulam	6 June 2008	Ancient chaitya and ruin site	
Sohonakulam ruins		Sohonakulam	Periyaulukkulama	Vavuniya South	6 June 2008	Chaitya and ruins	
Thammenna Kanda ruins		Thammenna Kanda	Asikulam	Vavuniya	23 February 2007	Dagaba on top of mountain and archaeological remains at foot of mountain	
Kudakachchakodiya; Thonigala inscription			Mahamailankulama	Vavuniya South	6 June 2008	Inscription and ruins	
Ulukkulam stone bridge		Ulukkulam	Periyaulukkulama	Vavuniya South	6 June 2008		
