= Sri Lankan IDP numbers, April 2009 =

Numbers of Sri Lankan internally displaced persons displaced from the Vanni region since October 2008 and detained by the Sri Lankan Military at various camps in northern and eastern Sri Lanka during April 2009:

Camp	Div Sec Division	Admin District	8 Apr	20 Apr	21 Apr	22 Apr	23 Apr	26 Apr	28 Apr	29 Apr
Menik Farm Zone 0 (Kathirkamar Village)	Vengalachedikulam	VAV	6,698	8,278	8,278	8,278	8,572	9,292	23,424	23,424
Menik Farm Zone 1 (Ananda Kumarasamy Village)	Vengalachedikulam	VAV					9,700	8,800	10,500	11,416
Menik Farm Zone 2 (Pon Ramanathan Village)	Vengalachedikulam	VAV						38,000	34,000	34,000
Menik Farm Zone 3 (Arunachchalam Village)	Vengalachedikulam	VAV	14,955	21,125	26,222	26,222	31,308	36,946	37,721	37,768
Andiyapuliyankulam School	Vengalachedikulam	VAV					1,620	1,620	1,620	1,620
Ariviththodam Sivanantha Vidyalayam, Menik Farm	Vengalachedikulam	VAV	603	603	603	603	603	1,190	1,190	1,190
Cheddikulam Maha Vidyalayam	Vengalachedikulam	VAV	1,930	1,804	1,804	1,804	1,804	1,802	1,802	1,802
Muthaliyankulam Maha Vidyalayam	Vengalachedikulam	VAV					1,522	1,522	1,522	1,522
Gamini Maha Vidyalayam	Vavuniya	VAV	1,787	797	797	797	990	1,246	1,594	1,594
Kanthapuram Maha Vidyalayam (Scandapuram)	Vavuniya	VAV					1,100	1,100	1,100	1,100
Komarasankulam Maha Vidyalayam	Vavuniya	VAV							2,385	2,385
Kovilkulam Hindu College	Vavuniya	VAV	1,437	1,437	1,437	1,437	1,437	1,850	1,850	1,850
Nelukkulam Kalaimahal Maha Vidyalayam	Vavuniya	VAV	3,572	3,572	3,272	3,495	3,495	3,495	3,495	3,495
Nelukkulam Technical College	Vavuniya	VAV	3,290	3,263	3,495	3,272	3,272	1,584	104	118
Omanthai Maha Vidyalayam	Vavuniya	VAV					2,475	4,975		
Pampamadhu Hostel School	Vavuniya	VAV	4,178	4,334	4,334	4,334	4,334	4,278	4,576	4,576
Ponthoodam Government Tamil Mixed School	Vavuniya	VAV	1,369	1,282	1,282	1,282	1,282	1,667	1,674	1,660
Poonathoddam College of Education	Vavuniya	VAV	5,521	5,571	5,571	5,571	6,071	6,071	5,989	5,989
Poovarasankulam Maha Vidyalayam	Vavuniya	VAV					1,000	1,000	997	997
Puthukkulam Maha Vidyalayam	Vavuniya	VAV			3,002	3,002	3,128	3,128	3,128	3,128
Rambakulam Ladies College	Vavuniya	VAV							1,000	1,200
Sivapirakasa Ladies College, Vavuniya	Vavuniya	VAV	3,252	2,755	2,755	2,755	2,480	3,672	3,517	3,470
Thandikulam Maha Vidyalayam	Vavuniya	VAV			1,217	1,217	1,514	1,518	1,518	1,518
Vavuniya Muslim Maha Vidyalayam	Vavuniya	VAV	1,554	1,538	1,544	1,544	1,544	1,544	1,528	1,528
Vavuniya Tamil Maha Vidyalayam (Primary)	Vavuniya	VAV	1,377	1,352	1,352	1,352	1,352	1,352	1,352	1,352
Vavuniya Tamil Maha Vidyalayam (Senior)	Vavuniya	VAV	4,095	3,871	3,871	3,871	6,071	5,526	5,085	5,085
Chavakachcheri Hindu College	Thenmarachchi	JAF			736	736	740	740	1,270	1,270
Chavakachcheri Hindu Ladies College	Thenmarachchi	JAF			1,941	1,941	2,255	2,255	1,394	1,394
Kaithady Ayurvedic University Hostel	Thenmarachchi	JAF	1,388	1,388	1,117	1,117	1,109	1,109	1,109	1,109
Kaithady Hindu Children Home	Thenmarachchi	JAF	668	668	238	238	227	227	227	227
Kaithady Palmyra Research Institute 1	Thenmarachchi	JAF	365	365	721	721	715	715	715	715
Kaithady Palmyra Research Institute 2	Thenmarachchi	JAF					621	621	621	621
Kodikamam Government Tamil Mixed School	Thenmarachchi	JAF	997	997	998	998	1,003	1,003	1,002	1,002
Kodikamam Thirunavitkarasu Maha Vidyalayam	Thenmarachchi	JAF			2,070	2,070	2,070	2,070	1,175	1,175
Kopay Teacher Training College	Valikamam East	JAF	435	435	466	466	484	484	484	484
Murusivil Roman Catholic Tamil Mixed School	Thenmarachchi	JAF	1,759	1,759	1,796	1,796	1,770	1,770	1,770	1,770
Nelliyady Central College	Valikamam South West	JAF							1,250	1,250
Thirunagar Old Court House	Jaffna	JAF	129	129	104	104	72	72	72	72
Illupaikkulam	Mannar Town	MAN	52	52	52	52	52	52	52	52
Kalimoddai	Nanaddan	MAN	454	454	454	454	454	454	454	454
Mannar District General Hospital	Mannar Town	MAN	279	279	1,007	1,007	1,007	1,141	1,141	1,141
Sirukandal	Nanaddan	MAN	350	350	350	350	350	350	350	350
Arafat Nagar Muslim Maha Vidyalam	Kuchaveli	TRI							1,561	1,561
Kantale Base Hospital	Kantale	TRI	51	39	39	39	39	39	29	29
Pulmoddai Field Hospital	Kuchaveli	TRI								4
Pulmoddai Muslim Maha Vidyalayam	Kuchaveli	TRI							1,742	1,742
Pulmoddai Sinhala Maha Vidyalayam	Kuchaveli	TRI							2,165	2,165
Thampalakamam Peripheral Unit	Thampalakamam	TRI	15	24	24	24	24	24	32	32
Trincomalee General Hospital	Town & Gravets	TRI	252	171	171	171	171	171	131	131
Colombo National Hospital		COL	58	58	59	59	59	59	59	59
Kandy Teaching Hospital		KAN	59	59	32	32	32	32	32	32
Maharagama Cancer Hospital		COL	1	1	1	1	1	1	1	1
Padaviya Base Hospital		ANU	206	206	274	274	274	396	396	396
Polonnaruwa General Hospital		POL	83	83	83	83	83	83	83	83
Total			63,219	69,099	83,569	83,569	110,286	157,046	171,988	173,108
