= Sri Lankan IDP numbers, August and September 2009 =

Numbers of Sri Lankan internally displaced persons displaced from the Vanni region since October 2008 and detained by the Sri Lankan Military at various camps in northern and eastern Sri Lanka during August and September 2009:

Camp	Div Sec Division	Admin District	7 Aug	10 Aug	18 Aug	28 Aug	4 Sep	9 Sep	23 Sep	24 Sep
Menik Farm Zone 0 (Kathirkamar Village)	Vengalachedikulam	VAV	19,553	19,553	19,553	19,555	19,573	19,573	18,754	18,754
Menik Farm Zone 1 (Ananda Kumarasamy Village)	Vengalachedikulam	VAV	46,999	46,999	47,062	46,918	46,918	46,918	46,271	46,271
Menik Farm Zone 2 (Pon Ramanathan Village)	Vengalachedikulam	VAV	55,032	55,032	54,873	54,653	54,653	54,621	52,288	52,288
Menik Farm Zone 3 (Arunachchalam Village)	Vengalachedikulam	VAV	43,794	43,794	43,794	44,201	44,190	44,190	42,527	42,527
Menik Farm Zone 4	Vengalachedikulam	VAV	38,102	38,102	38,056	37,161	37,125	37,125	34,920	34,920
Menik Farm Zone 5	Vengalachedikulam	VAV	4,992	4,992	4,992	7,964	7,964	7,964	7,753	7,753
Menik Farm Zone 6	Vengalachedikulam	VAV						6,369	6,296	6,296
Menik Farm Zone 7 (Maruthamadu Welfare Centre)	Vengalachedikulam	VAV		2,510	4,154	4,154	4,154	4,154	3,841	3,841
Andiyapuliyankulam School^{1}	Vengalachedikulam	VAV	1,403	1,403	1,403	1,403	1,403			
Ariviththodam Sivanantha Vidyalayam, Menik Farm^{2}	Vengalachedikulam	VAV	963	925	925	925	925			
Cheddikulam Base Hospital	Vengalachedikulam	VAV	628	628	628	461	461	461	461	461
Cheddikulam Maha Vidyalayam^{3}	Vengalachedikulam	VAV	1,750	1,750	1,750	1,750	1,750			
Sooduventhapualvu Muslim School^{4}	Vengalachedikulam	VAV	2,036	2,036	2,036	2,036	2,036			
Sumathipuram Welfare Centre, Ulunkkulam	Vengalachedikulam	VAV	5,442	5,442	5,442	5,442	5,442	5,442	5,384	5,384
Tharmapuram Welfare Centre (Mahakongaskada (MKK))	Vengalachedikulam	VAV	5,015	4,997	4,997	4,997	4,997	4,997	4,991	4,991
Veerapuram Maha Vidyalayam	Vengalachedikulam	VAV	5,469	5,469	5,469	5,469	5,469	5,469	5,060	5,060
Komarasankulam Maha Vidyalayam	Vavuniya	VAV	2,087	2,087	2,087	2,087	2,087	2,007	1,965	1,964
Nelukkulam Kalaimahal Maha Vidyalayam^{5}	Vavuniya	VAV	2,724	2,724	1,080	1,080	1,080			
Pampaimadu Hospital	Vavuniya	VAV	155	155	155	151	151	151	151	151
Poonathoddam College of Education	Vavuniya	VAV	5,511	5,511	5,511	5,308	5,308	5,308	5,252	5,252
Poovarankulam Base Hospital	Vavuniya	VAV	280	280	280	185	185	185	185	185
Puthukkulam Maha Vidyalayam	Vavuniya	VAV	1,868	1,868	1,868	1,868	1,868	1,868	1,792	1,792
Sivapirakasa Ladies College, Vavuniya	Vavuniya	VAV	2,691							
Thandikulam Maha Vidyalayam	Vavuniya	VAV	977	977	977	977	977	987	963	963
Vavuniya General Hospital	Vavuniya	VAV	973	973	973	671	671	671	671	671
Kaithady Ayurvedic University Hostel	Thenmarachchi	JAF	1,042	1,042	659	629	629	629		
Kaithady Hindu Children Home	Thenmarachchi	JAF	195	195	197	197	197	197	188	188
Kaithady Palmyra Research Institute 1	Thenmarachchi	JAF	1,292	1,292	1,027	1,013	1,013	1,013	1,238	1,238
Kodikamam Government Tamil Mixed School	Thenmarachchi	JAF	995	995	754	708	708	708	712	712
Kodikamam Ramavil (Kodikamam Forest)	Thenmarachchi	JAF	4,948	4,948	3,114	2,953	2,953	2,953	4,697	4,697
Kopay Teacher Training College	Valikamam East	JAF	474	474	422	409	409	409	413	413
Murusivil Roman Catholic Tamil Mixed School	Thenmarachchi	JAF	1,763	1,763	1,438	1,307	1,307	1,307		
Thirunagar Old Court House	Jaffna	JAF	152	152	162	162	162	162	163	163
Illupaikkulam	Mannar Town	MAN	175	175	185	185	200	200	212	212
Kalimoddai	Nanaddan	MAN	655	655	607	607	613	613	629	629
Mannar District General Hospital	Mannar Town	MAN	524	524	524	427	427	427	427	427
Mannar Welfare Centre	Mannar Town	MAN	40	40	40	40				
Sirukandal	Nanaddan	MAN	583	583	535	535	554	554	558	558
Kantale Base Hospital	Kantale	TRI	2	2	2					
Sahanagama Welfare Centre Site 1, Pulmoddai (13th Mile post)	Kuchaveli	TRI	4,729	4,729	4,729	4,729	4,729	4,674	4,594	4,594
Sahanagama Welfare Centre Site 2, Pulmoddai (13th Mile post)	Kuchaveli	TRI	2,087	2,087	2,087	2,087	2,087	2,188	2,140	2,140
Kurunegala Teaching Hospital		KUR	110	110	110	64	64	64	64	64
Padaviya Base Hospital		ANU	30	30	30	25	25	25	25	25
Polonnaruwa General Hospital		POL	1	1	1					
Total			268,241	268,004	264,688	265,493	265,464	264,583	255,585	255,584

- 1. Andiyapuliyankulam School camp was closed in early September 2009 and IDPs moved to Menik Farm Zone 6.
- 2. Ariviththodam Sivanantha Vidyalayam camp was closed in early September 2009 and IDPs moved to Menik Farm Zone 6.
- 3. Cheddikulam Maha Vidyalayam camp was closed in early September 2009 and IDPs moved to Menik Farm Zone 6.
- 4. Sooduventhapualvu Muslim School camp was closed in early September 2009 and IDPs moved to Menik Farm Zone 6.
- 5. Nelukkulam Kalaimahal Maha Vidyalayam camp was closed in early September 2009 and IDPs moved to Menik Farm Zone 6.
