= Sri Lankan IDP numbers, October 2009 to January 2010 =

Numbers of Sri Lankan internally displaced persons displaced from the Vanni region since October 2008 and detained by the Sri Lankan Military at various camps in northern and eastern Sri Lanka during October 2009 to January 2010:

Camp	Div Sec Division	Admin District	28 Oct	29 Oct	5 Nov	13 Nov	17 Dec	24 Dec	31 Dec	17 Jan	20 Jan
Menik Farm Zone 0 (Kathirkamar Village)	Vengalachedikulam	VAV	13,322	13,111	13,265	14,505	14,279	14,222	13,430	13,417	13,445
Menik Farm Zone 1 (Ananda Kumarasamy Village)	Vengalachedikulam	VAV	38,802	44,625	34,966	32,031	24,189	24,096	24,140	23,990	24,033
Menik Farm Zone 2 (Pon Ramanathan Village)	Vengalachedikulam	VAV	39,559	39,325	33,660	31,124	23,806	23,557	23,486	23,443	23,506
Menik Farm Zone 3 (Arunachchalam Village)	Vengalachedikulam	VAV	27,751	27,505	25,068	24,966	20,362	19,775	19,233	17,595	18,534
Menik Farm Zone 4	Vengalachedikulam	VAV	22,015	30,216	19,964	15,864	14,240	13,468	13,494	13,416	13,416
Menik Farm Zone 5	Vengalachedikulam	VAV	6,288	6,428	3,338	3,291	2,481	2,206	2,172	2,175	2,179
Menik Farm Zone 6	Vengalachedikulam	VAV	7,042	6,994	5,014	4,990	4,398	4,398	3,882	3,974	3,975
Menik Farm Zone 7 (Maruthamadu Welfare Centre)	Vengalachedikulam	VAV	3,307	3,307	3,005	1,757					
Cheddikulam Base Hospital	Vengalachedikulam	VAV	461	461	461	461					
Sumathipuram Welfare Centre, Ulunkkulam	Vengalachedikulam	VAV	3,767	3,767	2,760	2,398					
Tharmapuram Welfare Centre (Mahakongaskada (MKK))	Vengalachedikulam	VAV	4,258	4,258	3,597	3,523	2,736	2,572	2,566	2,556	2,558
Veerapuram Maha Vidyalayam	Vengalachedikulam	VAV	3,572	3,572	2,332	1,929	1,620	1,083			
Komarasankulam Maha Vidyalayam	Vavuniya	VAV	1,922	1,922	1,672						
Pampaimadu Hospital	Vavuniya	VAV	151	151	151	151					
Poonathoddam College of Education	Vavuniya	VAV	2,923	2,923	1,985						
Poovarankulam Base Hospital	Vavuniya	VAV	185	185	185	185					
Puthukkulam Maha Vidyalayam	Vavuniya	VAV	1,474	1,474	1,099						
Thandikulam Maha Vidyalayam	Vavuniya	VAV	506	506							
Vavuniya General Hospital	Vavuniya	VAV	671	671	671	671					
Kaithady Ayurvedic University Hostel	Thenmarachchi	JAF			260						
Kaithady Hindu Children Home	Thenmarachchi	JAF	187	187							
Kaithady Palmyra Research Institute	Thenmarachchi	JAF	1,234	1,234	418	456	456	456	316	316	316
Kodikamam Government Tamil Mixed School	Thenmarachchi	JAF	712	712	254						
Kodikamam Ramavil (Kodikamam Forest)	Thenmarachchi	JAF	4,694	4,694	1,274	1,846	2,846	2,846	2,606	2,606	2,606
Kopay Teacher Training College	Valikamam East	JAF	411	411	71						
Manalkadu	Vadamarachchi East	JAF					685	685	685	685	685
Murusivil Roman Catholic Tamil Mixed School	Thenmarachchi	JAF			379	434					
Thirunagar Old Court House	Jaffna	JAF	163	163	160						
Illupaikkulam	Mannar Town	MAN	601	601	601	437	504	567	567	550	550
Jeevodayam		MAN				436	329	329	323	302	302
Kalimoddai	Nanaddan	MAN	503	503	503	797	476	638	639	548	548
Mannar District General Hospital	Mannar Town	MAN	427	427	427	427					
Sirukandal	Nanaddan	MAN	885	885	885	442	418	628	567	550	550
Sahanagama Welfare Centre Site 1, Pulmoddai (13th Mile post)	Kuchaveli	TRI	4,260	4,260	4,260	2,639	200				
Sahanagama Welfare Centre Site 2, Pulmoddai (13th Mile post)	Kuchaveli	TRI	2,043	2,043	2,043	723					
Transit Sites		TRI	663	663	663						
Kurunegala Teaching Hospital		KUR	64	64	64	64					
Padaviya Base Hospital		ANU	25	25	25	25					
Total			194,848	208,273	165,480	146,572	114,025	111,526	108,106	106,123	107,203
