= Sri Lankan IDP numbers, February to December 2010 =

Numbers of Sri Lankan internally displaced persons displaced from the Vanni region since October 2008 and detained by the Sri Lankan Military at various camps in northern Sri Lanka during February 2010 to December 2010:

Camp	Div Sec Division	Admin District	5 Feb	11 Feb	22 Feb	25 Feb	11 Mar	26 Aug	8 Oct	2 Dec
Menik Farm Zone 0 (Kathirkamar Village)	Vengalachedikulam	VAV	13,437	13,327	15,718	15,212	14,537	5,724	4,507	6,619
Menik Farm Zone 1 (Ananda Kumarasamy Village)	Vengalachedikulam	VAV	23,978	24,961	24,126	23,741	21,895	8,805	7,315	9,691
Menik Farm Zone 2 (Pon Ramanathan Village)	Vengalachedikulam	VAV	22,885	22,385	22,236	21,890	20,003	7,039	5,692	
Menik Farm Zone 3 (Arunachchalam Village)	Vengalachedikulam	VAV	18,479	19,486	17,813	17,500	16,984	7,209	4,181	3,843
Menik Farm Zone 4	Vengalachedikulam	VAV	12,841	12,694	12,144	11,885	11,194	3,930	3,356	
Menik Farm Zone 5	Vengalachedikulam	VAV	2,913	2,863						
Menik Farm Zone 6	Vengalachedikulam	VAV	3,970	3,937	3,783	3,698	3,588			
Tharmapuram Welfare Centre (Mahakongaskada (MKK))	Vengalachedikulam	VAV	2,464							
Kaithady Palmyra Research Institute	Thenmarachchi	JAF	316	316	316	316	316			
Kodikamam Ramavil (Kodikamam Forest)	Thenmarachchi	JAF	2,606	2,606	2,606	2,606	2,606	2,239	1,226	1,179
Manalkadu	Vadamarachchi East	JAF	685	685	685	685	685		367	
Illupaikkulam	Mannar Town	MAN	541	481	481	481	346			
Jeevodayam		MAN	302	142	142	142				
Kalimoddai	Nanaddan	MAN	548	517	517	477	332			
Sirukandal	Nanaddan	MAN	554	452	452	433	345			
Total			106,519	104,852	101,019	99,066	92,828	34,946	26,644	21,332
