= Pavakkulam South Bank - Track 07 Grama Niladhari Division =

Pavakkulam South Bank - Track 07
- Grama Niladhari Division
- Interactive map of Pavakkulam South Bank - Track 07
- Coordinates: 8.690277°N 80.376845°E
- Country: Sri Lanka
- Province: Northern Province
- District: Vavuniya District
- Divisional Secretariat: Vavuniya South Divisional Secretariat
- Electoral District: Vanni Electoral District
- Polling Division: Vavuniya Polling Division

Area
  - Total: 7.65 km^{2} (2.95 sq mi)
- Elevation: 63 m (207 ft)

Population (2012)
  - Total: 168
  - Density: 22/km^{2} (57/sq mi)
- ISO 3166 code: LK-4306025

Pavakkulam South Bank - Track 07

Pavakkulam South Bank - Track 07 Grama Niladhari Division is a Grama Niladhari Division of the Vavuniya South Divisional Secretariat of Vavuniya District of Northern Province, Sri Lanka . It has Grama Niladhari Division Code C209D.

Pavakkulam South Bank - Track 07 is a surrounded by the Awaranthulawa, Unit 2 Pavatkulam, Periya Ulukkulama, Acres 20 - 40 - 60, Acres 400, Unit 9 & 10 Pavatkulam, Kangankulam, Kanthasamy Nagar and Poomaduwa Grama Niladhari Divisions.

== Demographics ==
=== Ethnicity ===
The Pavakkulam South Bank - Track 07 Grama Niladhari Division has a Sinhalese majority (100.0%) . In comparison, the Vavuniya South Divisional Secretariat (which contains the Pavakkulam South Bank - Track 07 Grama Niladhari Division) has a Sinhalese majority (96.1%)

Ethnicity in Pavakkulam South Bank - Track 07
1. Sinhalese (100.0%)
2. Other (0.00%)

=== Religion ===
The Pavakkulam South Bank - Track 07 Grama Niladhari Division has a Buddhist majority (99.4%) . In comparison, the Vavuniya South Divisional Secretariat (which contains the Pavakkulam South Bank - Track 07 Grama Niladhari Division) has a Buddhist majority (95.5%)

Religion in Pavakkulam South Bank - Track 07
1. Buddhist (99.4%)
2. Other (0.60%)
