= Sri Lankan IDP numbers, February and March 2009 =

Numbers of Sri Lankan internally displaced persons displaced from the Vanni region since October 2008 and detained by the Sri Lankan Military at various camps in northern and eastern Sri Lanka during February and March 2009:

Camp	Div Sec Division	Admin District	9 Feb	11 Feb	16 Feb	25 Feb	27 Feb	2 Mar	4 Mar	6 Mar	11 Mar	13 Mar	24 Mar	30 Mar	31 Mar
Menik Farm Zone 0 (Kathirkamar Village)	Vengalachedikulam	VAV			1,353	2,768	2,791	2,791	3,344	4,212	4,679	4,679	6,459	6,459	6,459
Menik Farm Zone 3 (Arunachchalam Village)	Vengalachedikulam	VAV											6,729	11,881	11,881
Ariviththodam Sivanantha Vidyalayam, Menik Farm	Vengalachedikulam	VAV	581	581	581	581	584	584	585	585	583	583	601	601	601
Cheddikulam Maha Vidyalayam	Vengalachedikulam	VAV	1,624	1,624	1,624	1,965	1,965	1,965	1,996	1,996	2,001	2,001	1,995	1,995	1,995
Gamini Maha Vidyalayam	Vavuniya	VAV	1,306	1,306	2,017	1,618	1,618	1,618	1,263	1,307	1,382	1,382	1,471	1,487	1,487
Kovilkulam Hindu College	Vavuniya	VAV		1,066	1,056	1,081	1,143	1,143	1,130	1,130	1,139	1,139	1,167	1,166	1,166
Nelukkulam Kalaimahal Maha Vidyalayam	Vavuniya	VAV	2,829	2,829	2,829	3,071	3,084	3,084	3,084	3,068	3,068	3,082	3,101	3,070	3,070
Nelukkulam Technical College	Vavuniya	VAV		1,527	2,374	2,913	2,913	2,913	2,730	2,801	2,801	2,968	3,020	3,032	3,032
Pampamadhu Hostel School	Vavuniya	VAV	2,779	2,779	4,181	4,131	4,131	4,131	4,131	4,108	4,108	4,108	4,178	4,178	4,178
Ponthoodam Government Tamil Mixed School	Vavuniya	VAV	1,351	1,351	1,351	1,365	1,310	1,310	1,310	1,308	1,308	1,320	1,327	1,319	1,319
Poonathoddam College of Education	Vavuniya	VAV	4,406	4,406	5,302	5,302	5,009	5,009	5,009	5,036	5,036	5,119	5,236	5,243	5,243
Sivapirakasa Ladies College, Vavuniya	Vavuniya	VAV					2,257	2,257	2,346	2,390	2,612	2,612	3,020	2,973	2,973
Vavuniya Muslim Maha Vidyalayam	Vavuniya	VAV		1,333	1,767	1,767							1,360	1,394	1,394
Vavuniya Tamil Maha Vidyalayam (Primary)	Vavuniya	VAV			1,916	1,929	1,390	1,390		1,153	1,153	1,153	1,196	1,168	1,168
Vavuniya Tamil Maha Vidyalayam (Senior)	Vavuniya	VAV		1,200	4,390	3,838	4,085	4,085	5,475	3,540	3,390	3,390	3,963	3,969	3,969
Kaithady Ayurvedic University Hostel	Thenmarachchi	JAF									647	647	1,073	1,073	1,083
Kaithady Hindu Children Home	Thenmarachchi	JAF								184	184	184	667	667	668
Kaithady Palmyra Research Institute 1	Thenmarachchi	JAF													357
Kodikamam Government Tamil Mixed School	Thenmarachchi	JAF			411	424	503	503	655	711	706	706	1,006	1,006	1,006
Kopay Teacher Training College	Valikamam East	JAF			444	438	464	464	463	463	463	463	464	464	464
Murusivil Roman Catholic Tamil Mixed School	Thenmarachchi	JAF			1,139	1,140	1,139	1,139	1,140	1,140	1,313	1,313	1,691	1,691	1,786
Thirunagar Old Court House	Jaffna	JAF			73	74	49	49	108	108	113	113	114	114	140
Illupaikkulam	Mannar Town	MAN			52	52	52	52	52	52	52	52	52	52	52
Kalimoddai	Nanaddan	MAN			445	445	445	445	445	454	454	454	454	454	454
Mannar District General Hospital	Mannar Town	MAN					279	279	279	279	279	279	279	279	279
Sirukandal	Nanaddan	MAN			357	357	357	357	357	350	350	350	350	350	350
Kantale Base Hospital	Kantale	TRI				84	160	127	127	127	80	80	57	57	57
Methodist School		TRI				83	52	26	32	126	40	40			
Pulmoddai Field Hospital	Kuchaveli	TRI											79	79	129
Thampalakamam Peripheral Unit	Thampalakamam	TRI				33	76	79	77	77	75	75	35	35	35
Trincomalee General Hospital	Town & Gravets	TRI				678	544	512	417	492	426	426	374	374	296
Colombo National Hospital		COL				28	75	106	106	106	97	97	186	186	118
Padaviya Base Hospital		ANU											145	145	223
Polonnaruwa General Hospital		POL				86	171	171	171	171	171	171	100	100	92
Total			14,876	20,002	33,662	36,251	36,646	36,589	36,832	37,474	38,710	38,986	51,949	57,061	57,524
