= Sri Lankan IDP numbers, May 2009 =

Numbers of Sri Lankan internally displaced persons displaced from the Vanni region since October 2008 and detained by the Sri Lankan Military at various camps in northern and eastern Sri Lanka during May 2009:

Camp	Div Sec Division	Admin District	4 May	5 May	6 May	11 May	13 May	14 May	17 May	18 May	21 May	22 May	25 May	28 May	29 May
Menik Farm Zone 0 (Kathirkamar Village)	Vengalachedikulam	VAV	23,424	23,440	22,769	22,769	22,769	22,769	22,769	22,769	22,769	22,769	22,769	19,009	19,009
Menik Farm Zone 1 (Ananda Kumarasamy Village)	Vengalachedikulam	VAV	12,831	12,833	12,833	12,852	12,852	12,852	12,852	14,888	39,657	47,888	47,888	42,606	42,606
Menik Farm Zone 2 (Pon Ramanathan Village)	Vengalachedikulam	VAV	50,698	54,422	56,949	60,722	60,830	60,926	61,311	68,742	74,744	75,453	75,453	72,934	72,934
Menik Farm Zone 3 (Arunachchalam Village)	Vengalachedikulam	VAV	38,371	38,414	39,037	40,126	39,977	39,985	39,985	39,985	39,985	39,985	39,985	39,701	39,701
Menik Farm Zone 4	Vengalachedikulam	VAV								7,500	28,919	34,919	37,800	40,937	40,937
Andiyapuliyankulam School^{1}	Vengalachedikulam	VAV	1,620	1,620	1,620					1,564	1,564	1,564	1,564	1,564	1,564
Ariviththodam Sivanantha Vidyalayam, Menik Farm	Vengalachedikulam	VAV	1,190	1,174	1,174	1,174	1,174	1,174	1,174	1,174	1,174	1,174	1,174	1,174	1,174
Cheddikulam Maha Vidyalayam	Vengalachedikulam	VAV	1,802	1,802	1,802	1,770	1,770	1,770	1,770	1,770	1,770	1,770	1,770	1,770	1,770
Muthaliyankulam Maha Vidyalayam^{2}	Vengalachedikulam	VAV	972	972	972										
Sooduventhapualvu Muslim School	Vengalachedikulam	VAV							2,965	2,055	2,055	2,055	2,055	2,055	2,055
Gamini Maha Vidyalayam	Vavuniya	VAV	1,827	1,687	1,687	1,821	1,821	1,821	1,821	1,821	1,698	1,698	1,698	1,913	1,913
Kanthapuram Maha Vidyalayam (Scandapuram)	Vavuniya	VAV	100	100	100	1,102	1,102	1,102	1,102	1,102	1,102	1,102	1,102	1,102	1,102
Komarasankulam Maha Vidyalayam	Vavuniya	VAV	2,154	2,154	2,156	2,156	2,156	2,156	2,156	2,156	2,156	2,156	2,156	2,156	2,156
Kovilkulam Hindu College	Vavuniya	VAV	1,832	1,832	1,832	1,790	1,790	1,790	1,790	1,790	1,584	1,584	1,584	1,584	1,584
Nelukkulam Kalaimahal Maha Vidyalayam	Vavuniya	VAV	3,495	3,495	3,495	3,369	3,361	3,361	3,361	3,361	3,361	3,361	3,361	3,361	3,361
Nelukkulam Technical College	Vavuniya	VAV	118	118	1,640										
Pampamadhu Hostel School^{3}	Vavuniya	VAV	4,576	4,576	4,576	4,487	4,501	4,501	4,501	4,501	4,501	4,501	4,501		
Ponthoodam Government Tamil Mixed School	Vavuniya	VAV	1,660	1,599	1,599	1,599	1,599	1,599	1,599	1,599	1,599	1,599	1,599	1,599	1,599
Poonathoddam College of Education	Vavuniya	VAV	5,990	5,953	5,953	5,995	5,995	5,995	5,995	5,995	5,995	5,995	5,995	5,995	5,995
Puthukkulam Maha Vidyalayam	Vavuniya	VAV	3,128	3,036	3,036	3,024	3,024	3,024	3,024	3,024	3,024	3,024	3,024	3,024	3,024
Samanankulam School	Vavuniya	VAV	69	101	101	99	107	107	107	107	107	107	107	107	107
Sivapirakasa Ladies College, Vavuniya	Vavuniya	VAV	3,433	3,433	3,440	3,433	3,433	3,433	3,433	3,433	3,433	3,433	3,433	3,326	3,326
Thandikulam Maha Vidyalayam	Vavuniya	VAV	1,518	1,518	1,518	1,518	1,518	1,518	1,518	1,518	1,518	1,518	1,518	1,518	1,518
Vavuniya Muslim Maha Vidyalayam	Vavuniya	VAV	1,531	1,531	1,531	1,531	1,521	1,521	1,521	1,521	1,521	1,521	1,521	1,521	1,521
Vavuniya Tamil Maha Vidyalayam (Primary)	Vavuniya	VAV	1,352	1,352	1,352	1,251	1,251	1,251	1,251	1,251	1,251	1,251	1,251	1,261	1,261
Vavuniya Tamil Maha Vidyalayam (Senior)	Vavuniya	VAV	5,085	5,085	5,085	4,835	4,835	4,835	4,835	4,835	4,882	4,882	4,882	4,843	4,843
Velikkulam School	Vavuniya	VAV	1,301	1,301	1,225	1,227	1,227	1,227	1,227	1,227	1,227	1,227	1,227	1,227	1,227
Chavakachcheri Hindu College^{4}	Thenmarachchi	JAF	1,270	1,270	1,270	1,270	1,257	1,257	1,270						
Chavakachcheri Hindu Ladies College	Thenmarachchi	JAF	1,394	1,394	1,394	1,395	1,376	1,376	1,395	1,376	1,376	1,376	1,376	1,376	1,376
Kaithady Ayurvedic University Hostel	Thenmarachchi	JAF	1,109	1,109	1,109	1,101	1,101	1,101	1,101	1,101	1,101	1,101	1,101	1,101	1,101
Kaithady Hindu Children Home	Thenmarachchi	JAF	227	227	227	214	208	208	214	208	208	208	208	208	208
Kaithady Palmyra Research Institute 1	Thenmarachchi	JAF	715	715	715	715	715	715	715	715	715	715	715	715	715
Kaithady Palmyra Research Institute 2	Thenmarachchi	JAF	621	621	621	626	626	626	626	626	626	626	626	626	626
Kodikamam Government Tamil Mixed School	Thenmarachchi	JAF	1,002	1,002	1,002	1,004	989	989	1,004	989	989	989	989	989	989
Kodikamam Ramavil (Kodikamam Forest)	Thenmarachchi	JAF								2,435	2,435	2,435	2,435	2,435	2,435
Kodikamam Thirunavitkarasu Maha Vidyalayam^{5}	Thenmarachchi	JAF	1,175	1,175	1,175	1,176	1,178	1,178	1,176						
Kopay Teacher Training College	Valikamam East	JAF	484	484	484	483	529	529	483	529	529	529	529	529	529
Murusivil Roman Catholic Tamil Mixed School	Thenmarachchi	JAF	1,770	1,770	1,770	1,773	1,737	1,737	1,773	1,737	1,737	1,737	1,737	1,737	1,737
Nelliyady Central College	Valikamam South West	JAF	1,250	1,250	1,250	1,250	1,227	1,227	1,250	1,227	1,227	1,227	1,227	1,227	1,227
Thirunagar Old Court House	Jaffna	JAF	72	72	72	72	143	143	72	143	143	143	143	143	143
English Training Centre	Mannar Town	MAN												258	258
Illupaikkulam	Mannar Town	MAN	52	52	52	52	52	52	52	140	140	140	140	140	140
Kalimoddai	Nanaddan	MAN	454	454	454	454	454	454	454	454	454	454	454	454	454
Mannar District General Hospital	Mannar Town	MAN	1,141	1,141	1,141	1,141	1,389	1,389	1,389	1,539	1,539	1,539	1,539	1,539	1,539
Sirukandal	Nanaddan	MAN	350	350	350	350	350	350	350	350	350	350	350	350	350
Arafat Nagar Muslim Maha Vidyalam	Kuchaveli	TRI	1,561	1,564	1,564	1,585	2,149	2,149	2,149	2,149					
Kantale Base Hospital	Kantale	TRI	29	29	29	29	29	29	29	29	29	29	29	29	29
Pulmoddai Field Hospital	Kuchaveli	TRI	11	11	11	11									
Pulmoddai Muslim Maha Vidyalayam	Kuchaveli	TRI	1,742	1,732	1,732	1,732	1,732	1,732	1,732	1,732	4,347	4,347	4,403	4,403	4,403
Pulmoddai Sinhala Maha Vidyalayam	Kuchaveli	TRI	2,165	2,370	2,370	2,363	2,298	2,298	2,298	2,298	2,295	2,295	2,295	2,294	2,294
Thampalakamam Peripheral Unit	Thampalakamam	TRI	35	35	35	35	35	35	35	35	35	35	35	35	35
Trincomalee General Hospital	Town & Gravets	TRI	131	131	131	134	131	131	131	131	131	131	131	131	131
Colombo National Hospital		COL	57	57	57	56	56	56	56	57	57	57	57	57	
Kandy Teaching Hospital		KAN	29	29	29	29	29	29	29	29	29	29	29	29	
Maharagama Cancer Hospital		COL	1	1	1	1	1	1	1	1	1	1	1	1	
Padaviya Base Hospital		ANU	222	222	222	222	413	413	413	413	413	413	413	413	413
Polonnaruwa General Hospital		POL	83	83	83	83	83	83	83	83	83	83	83	83	83
Total			189,229	192,898	196,832	198,006	198,900	199,004	202,347	220,214	272,585	287,525	290,462	277,589	277,502

- 1. Andiyapuliyankulam School camp was closed in early May 2009 and IDPs moved to Menik Farm Zone 2.
- 2. Muthaliyankulam Maha Vidyalayam camp was closed in early May 2009 and IDPs moved to Menik Farm Zone 2.
- 3. Pampamadhu Hostel School camp was closed on 27 May 2009 and IDPs moved to Kodikamam Ramavil.
- 4. Chavakachcheri Hindu College camp was closed in late May 2009 and IDPs moved to Kodikamam Ramavil.
- 5. Kodikamam Thirunavitkarasu Maha Vidyalayam camp was closed in late May2009 and IDPs moved to Kodikamam Ramavil.
