= Cheddikulam massacre =

1984 massacre of Sri Lankan Tamil civilians

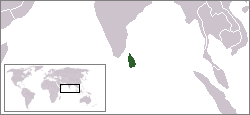
- Location of Sri Lanka
- Location: Cheddikulam, Northern Province, Sri Lanka
- Date: December 02, 1984 (+8 GMT)
- Target: Sri Lankan Tamil Civilians
- Deaths: 52
- Injuries: Unknown
- Perpetrator: Sri Lankan military

The Cheddikulam massacre was a massacre of Sri Lankan Tamil civilians in the village of Cheddikulam, located on the border of the Vavuniya and Mannar districts. It was among the first of the series of massacres carried out by the Sri Lankan armed forces during the country's Civil War.

== Massacre ==
On December 2, 1984, the Sri Lankan military imposed a curfew throughout Cheddikulam and the adjoining villages and towns. The military began cordoning off the village at 5.30 a.m. Most of its inhabitants were still asleep, when armed personnel entered the village and took away the males of the village for 'inquiries'.

52 men were reportedly bundled into military vehicles, and taken to the Anuradhapura District and killed. The locals allege that the 52 men were taken to a Sinhalese settlement near Medawachchiya, and were chopped up with sharp knives and later heavy vehicles were run over them. As a result, the villagers say all the 52 men died.

=== Witness Accounts ===
T Yesuthasan, teacher at Cheddikulam Mahavidyalayam, says,

Following the incident people displaced to Vanni, Madhu and India. Among the 52 people killed were my younger brother, my brother-in-law and two more people in our family.

Another resident Mayilvahanam says,

On that day many of us ran into the forest and escaped. My home was completely destroyed by the Sri Lankan Army

== See also ==
- List of attacks on civilians attributed to Sri Lankan government forces
- Batang Kali massacre
