= Sri Lankan IDP numbers, June and July 2009 =

Numbers of Sri Lankan internally displaced persons displaced from the Vanni region since October 2008 and detained by the Sri Lankan Military at various camps in northern and eastern Sri Lanka during June and July 2009:

| Camp | Div Sec Division | Admin District | 4 Jun | 8 Jun | 11 Jun | 16 Jun | 18 Jun | 26 Jun | 30 Jun | 3 Jul | 9 Jul | 10 Jul | 17 Jul | 28 Jul |
|---|---|---|---|---|---|---|---|---|---|---|---|---|---|---|
| Menik Farm Zone 0 (Kathirkamar Village) | Vengalachedikulam | VAV | 18,829 | 19,083 | 19,254 | 19,429 | 19,429 | 19,429 | 19,429 | 19,572 | 19,572 | 19,673 | 19,644 | 19,644 |
| Menik Farm Zone 1 (Ananda Kumarasamy Village) | Vengalachedikulam | VAV | 46,458 | 46,458 | 45,937 | 46,000 | 46,000 | 46,789 | 46,789 | 46,957 | 46,957 | 47,168 | 47,093 | 47,080 |
| Menik Farm Zone 2 (Pon Ramanathan Village) | Vengalachedikulam | VAV | 73,306 | 73,484 | 73,929 | 73,816 | 73,816 | 69,281 | 68,705 | 68,172 | 68,172 | 62,623 | 62,623 | 62,623 |
| Menik Farm Zone 3 (Arunachchalam Village) | Vengalachedikulam | VAV | 42,812 | 43,063 | 43,817 | 44,289 | 44,289 | 43,900 | 43,900 | 43,900 | 43,900 | 44,506 | 44,063 | 44,285 |
| Menik Farm Zone 4 | Vengalachedikulam | VAV | 40,721 | 41,142 | 44,801 | 43,471 | 43,471 | 42,852 | 42,852 | 42,589 | 42,589 | 42,589 | 42,589 | 38,102 |
| Menik Farm Zone 5 | Vengalachedikulam | VAV | | | | | | 4,992 | 4,992 | 5,107 | 5,107 | 5,107 | 5,107 | 4,992 |
| Andiyapuliyankulam School | Vengalachedikulam | VAV | 1,564 | 1,564 | 1,564 | 1,475 | 1,475 | 1,475 | 1,475 | 1,475 | 1,475 | 1,475 | 1,429 | 1,403 |
| Ariviththodam Sivanantha Vidyalayam, Menik Farm | Vengalachedikulam | VAV | 1,174 | 1,027 | 1,027 | 1,027 | 1,027 | 1,027 | 1,027 | 1,027 | 1,027 | 1,027 | 964 | 963 |
| Cheddikulam Base Hospital | Vengalachedikulam | VAV | | 593 | 593 | 593 | 593 | 646 | 646 | 646 | 646 | 646 | 646 | 646 |
| Cheddikulam Maha Vidyalayam | Vengalachedikulam | VAV | 1,770 | 1,770 | 1,770 | 1,757 | 1,757 | 1,750 | 1,750 | 1,750 | 1,750 | 1,750 | 1,750 | 1,750 |
| Sooduventhapualvu Muslim School | Vengalachedikulam | VAV | 2,029 | 2,036 | 2,036 | 2,036 | 2,036 | 2,036 | 2,036 | 2,036 | 2,036 | 2,036 | 2,036 | 2,036 |
| Sumathipuram Welfare Centre, Ulunkkulam | Vengalachedikulam | VAV | | | | 4,444 | 4,444 | 4,985 | 4,985 | 5,442 | 5,442 | 5,442 | 5,442 | 5,442 |
| Tharmapuram Welfare Centre (Mahakongaskada (MKK)) | Vengalachedikulam | VAV | | | | | | | | 533 | 533 | 4,481 | 4,481 | 5,015 |
| Veerapuram Maha Vidyalayam | Vengalachedikulam | VAV | | 3,110 | 4,147 | 5,781 | 5,781 | 5,486 | 5,486 | 5,469 | 5,469 | 5,469 | 5,469 | 5,469 |
| Gamini Maha Vidyalayam^{1} | Vavuniya | VAV | 1,933 | 1,933 | 1,634 | | | | | | | | | |
| Kanthapuram Maha Vidyalayam (Scandapuram)^{2} | Vavuniya | VAV | 1,123 | 1,026 | 1,026 | 1,026 | 1,026 | | | | | | | |
| Komarasankulam Maha Vidyalayam | Vavuniya | VAV | 2,195 | 2,195 | 2,195 | 2,195 | 2,195 | 2,195 | 2,195 | 2,071 | 2,071 | 2,071 | 2,071 | 2,071 |
| Kovilkulam Hindu College | Vavuniya | VAV | 1,589 | | | | | | | | | | | |
| Nelukkulam Kalaimahal Maha Vidyalayam | Vavuniya | VAV | 2,962 | 2,962 | 2,972 | 2,972 | 2,972 | 2,972 | 2,972 | 2,972 | 2,972 | 2,972 | 2,972 | 2,972 |
| Pampaimadu Hospital | Vavuniya | VAV | | 198 | 198 | 198 | 198 | 208 | 208 | 208 | 208 | 208 | 208 | 208 |
| Poonathoddam College of Education | Vavuniya | VAV | 6,091 | 6,091 | 5,837 | 5,811 | 5,811 | 5,811 | 5,811 | 5,629 | 5,629 | 5,629 | 5,605 | 5,605 |
| Poovarankulam Base Hospital | Vavuniya | VAV | | 1,204 | 1,204 | 1,204 | 1,204 | 1,179 | 1,179 | 1,179 | 1,179 | 1,179 | 1,179 | 1,179 |
| Puthukkulam Maha Vidyalayam | Vavuniya | VAV | 3,024 | 2,384 | 2,206 | 2,200 | 2,200 | 2,200 | 2,200 | 1,997 | 1,997 | 1,997 | 1,997 | 1,997 |
| Samanankulam School | Vavuniya | VAV | 114 | 114 | 114 | 114 | 114 | 114 | 114 | 114 | 114 | | | |
| Sivapirakasa Ladies College, Vavuniya | Vavuniya | VAV | 3,349 | 3,349 | 3,104 | 3,082 | 3,082 | 3,055 | 3,055 | 3,055 | 3,055 | 3,055 | 3,055 | 3,055 |
| Thandikulam Maha Vidyalayam | Vavuniya | VAV | 1,428 | 1,428 | 1,064 | 1,023 | 1,023 | 1,023 | 1,023 | 969 | 969 | 969 | 969 | 969 |
| Vavuniya General Hospital | Vavuniya | VAV | | 844 | 844 | 844 | 844 | 1,096 | 1,096 | 1,096 | 1,096 | 1,096 | 1,096 | 1,096 |
| Vavuniya Muslim Maha Vidyalayam | Vavuniya | VAV | 1,521 | | | | | | | | | | | |
| Vavuniya Tamil Maha Vidyalayam (Senior)^{3} | Vavuniya | VAV | 4,843 | 4,843 | 4,444 | | | | | | | | | |
| Velikkulam School | Vavuniya | VAV | 1,233 | 1,233 | | | | | | | | | | |
| Chavakachcheri Hindu Ladies College^{4} | Thenmarachchi | JAF | 1,376 | 1,376 | 1,376 | | | | | | | | | |
| Kaithady Ayurvedic University Hostel | Thenmarachchi | JAF | 1,097 | 1,097 | 1,097 | 1,049 | 1,049 | 1,049 | 1,049 | 1,049 | 1,042 | 1,042 | 1,042 | 1,042 |
| Kaithady Hindu Children Home | Thenmarachchi | JAF | 208 | 208 | 208 | 210 | 210 | 210 | 210 | 210 | 195 | 195 | 195 | 195 |
| Kaithady Palmyra Research Institute 1 | Thenmarachchi | JAF | 716 | 717 | 717 | 701 | 701 | 701 | 701 | 701 | 1,292 | 1,292 | 1,292 | 1,292 |
| Kaithady Palmyra Research Institute 2 | Thenmarachchi | JAF | 624 | 624 | 624 | 601 | 601 | 601 | 601 | 601 | | | | |
| Kodikamam Government Tamil Mixed School | Thenmarachchi | JAF | 991 | 994 | 994 | 1,003 | 1,003 | 1,003 | 1,003 | 1,003 | 995 | 995 | 995 | 995 |
| Kodikamam Ramavil (Kodikamam Forest) | Thenmarachchi | JAF | 2,440 | 2,440 | 2,440 | 4,995 | 4,995 | 4,995 | 4,995 | 4,995 | 4,948 | 4,948 | 4,948 | 4,948 |
| Kopay Teacher Training College | Valikamam East | JAF | 494 | 494 | 494 | 151 | 151 | 151 | 151 | 151 | 474 | 474 | 474 | 474 |
| Murusivil Roman Catholic Tamil Mixed School | Thenmarachchi | JAF | 1,738 | 1,739 | 1,739 | 1,769 | 1,769 | 1,769 | 1,769 | 1,769 | 1,763 | 1,763 | 1,763 | 1,763 |
| Nelliyady Central College^{5} | Valikamam South West | JAF | 1,236 | 1,237 | 1,237 | | | | | | | | | |
| Thirunagar Old Court House | Jaffna | JAF | 143 | 143 | 143 | 477 | 477 | 477 | 477 | 477 | 152 | 152 | 152 | 152 |
| English Training Centre | Mannar Town | MAN | 258 | 294 | 294 | 294 | 294 | 294 | | | | | | |
| Illupaikkulam | Mannar Town | MAN | 140 | 140 | 140 | 140 | 178 | 178 | 178 | 178 | 178 | 178 | 201 | 201 |
| Kalimoddai | Nanaddan | MAN | 454 | 454 | 454 | 454 | 454 | 454 | 454 | 454 | 454 | 454 | 454 | 454 |
| Mannar District General Hospital | Mannar Town | MAN | 1,539 | 1,539 | 1,539 | 707 | 707 | 649 | 649 | 649 | 649 | 649 | 649 | 649 |
| Mannar Welfare Centre | Mannar Town | MAN | | | | | 47 | 47 | 47 | 47 | 47 | 47 | 40 | 40 |
| Sirukandal | Nanaddan | MAN | 350 | 350 | 350 | 350 | 350 | 350 | 350 | 350 | 350 | 350 | 350 | 350 |
| Kantale Base Hospital | Kantale | TRI | 29 | 29 | 29 | 67 | 67 | 33 | 33 | 33 | 33 | 33 | 33 | 33 |
| Pulmoddai Muslim Maha Vidyalayam | Kuchaveli | TRI | 4,403 | 4,403 | 4,403 | 4,403 | 4,403 | 4,403 | 4,403 | | | | | |
| Pulmoddai Sinhala Maha Vidyalayam | Kuchaveli | TRI | 2,294 | 2,294 | 2,294 | 2,294 | 2,294 | 2,294 | 2,294 | | | | | |
| Sahanagama Welfare Centre Site 1, Pulmoddai (13th Mile post) | Kuchaveli | TRI | | | | | | | | 4,753 | 4,753 | 4,753 | 4,753 | 4,753 |
| Sahanagama Welfare Centre Site 2, Pulmoddai (13th Mile post) | Kuchaveli | TRI | | | | | | | | 2,080 | 2,078 | 2,078 | 2,078 | 2,078 |
| Thampalakamam Peripheral Unit | Thampalakamam | TRI | 35 | 35 | 35 | | | | | | | | | |
| Trincomalee General Hospital | Town & Gravets | TRI | 131 | 131 | 131 | | | | | | | | | |
| Colombo National Hospital | | COL | 57 | 57 | 57 | | | | | | | | | |
| Kandy Teaching Hospital | | KAN | 29 | 29 | 29 | | | | | | | | | |
| Maharagama Cancer Hospital | | COL | 1 | 1 | 1 | | | | | | | | | |
| Dambula Base Hospital | | MTL | | | | 62 | 62 | 20 | 20 | 20 | 20 | 20 | 20 | 20 |
| Hingurakgoda General Hospital | | POL | | | | 282 | 282 | 16 | 16 | 16 | 16 | 16 | 16 | 16 |
| Kurunegala Teaching Hospital | | KUR | | | | 555 | 555 | 198 | 198 | 198 | 198 | 198 | 198 | 198 |
| Madawachchiya District Hospital | | ANU | | | | 26 | 26 | | | | | | | |
| Padaviya Base Hospital | | ANU | 413 | 413 | 413 | 213 | 213 | 161 | 161 | 161 | 161 | 161 | 161 | 161 |
| Polonnaruwa General Hospital | | POL | 83 | 83 | 83 | 119 | 119 | 123 | 123 | 123 | 123 | 123 | 123 | 123 |
| Total | | | 281,347 | 284,455 | 287,038 | 285,709 | 285,794 | 284,677 | 283,807 | 283,983 | 283,886 | 283,089 | 282,425 | 278,539 |

- 1. Gamini Maha Vidyalayam camp was closed in late June 2009 and IDPs moved to Sumathipuram WC.
- 2. Kanthapuram Maha Vidyalayam camp was closed in late June 2009 and IDPs moved to Sumathipuram WC.
- 3. Vavuniya Tamil Maha Vidyalayam (Senior) camp was closed in late June 2009 and IDPs moved to Sumathipuram WC.
- 4. Chavakachcheri Hindu Ladies College camp was closed in early June 2009 and IDPs moved to Kodikamam Ramavil.
- 5. Nelliyady Central College camp was closed in early June 2009 and IDPs moved to Kodikamam Ramavil.
