= Venkalacheddikulam Divisional Council =

Local authority in Sri Lanka

Venkalacheddikulam Divisional Council வெங்கலசெட்டிகுளம் பிரதேச சபை

Type
- Type: Local authority

Leadership
- Chairman: Gabiriyel Anthony Iya, TNA since March 2011
- Deputy Chairman: Thangarasa Santhiramohan, TNA since March 2011
- Seats: 9

Elections
- Last election: 2011 Sri Lankan local government elections

Venkalacheddikulam Divisional Council (Tamil: வெங்கலசெட்டிகுளம் பிரதேச சபை Veṅkalaceṭṭikuḷam Piratēca Capai; VDC) is the local authority for Venkalacheddikulam DS Division in northern Sri Lanka. VDC is responsible for providing a variety of local public services including roads, sanitation, drains, housing, libraries, public parks and recreational facilities. It has 9 members elected using the open list proportional representation system.

== History ==
In 1987 there was a major re-organisation of local government in Sri Lanka. District Development Councils were abolished and replaced by Divisional Councils (Pradeshiya Sabha or Pradesha Sabhai). The Pradeshiya Sabha Act No. 15 of 1987 was passed by Parliament on 15 April 1987 and on 1 January 1988 257 Divisional Councils started functioning. The Divisional Councils were generally commensurate with their namesake Divisional Secretary's Divisions. Venkalacheddikulam Divisional Council was established as the local authority for Venkalacheddikulam DS Division. However, according to the pro-LTTE TamilNet, the Sri Lankan government had suspended all local government in the north and east of the country in 1983 using emergency regulations. The civil war prevented elections from being held for VDC until 2011 as the LTTE did not hold elections when it controlled the area.

In March 1994 elections were held in the east and in Vavuniya in the north. However, elections weren't held in other areas of the north, including the Jaffna Peninsula, because most of these areas were at that time controlled by the rebel Tamil Tigers. In August 1995 the Sri Lankan military launched an offensive to recapture the Jaffna Peninsula. By December 1995 the military had captured most of the Valikamam region of the peninsula, including the city of Jaffna. By 16 May 1996 the military had recaptured the entire peninsula. In late 1996 the government announced elections would be held for 23 local authorities in Jaffna District, Kilinochchi District, Mannar District and Vavuniya District but following opposition from Tamil political parties postponed them. On 3 December 1997 the government announced that elections would be held for the 17 local authorities on the Jaffna Peninsula. The elections were held on 29 January 1998.

On 1 January 2002 local authority elections were called for the entire country. It was later announced that elections would be held on 25 March 2002 in the north and east, and on 20 March 2002 in the rest of the country. The normal life term of Sri Lankan local government bodies is four years. On 21 March 2002 the Election Commissioner announced that the elections in the north and east, except for eight local authorities in Ampara District, had been postponed until 25 September 2002. On 17 September 2002 elections in the north and east were postponed, for a second time, until 25 June 2003. In June 2003 elections in the north and east were postponed, for a third time, until 24 January 2004. In January 2004 elections in the north and east, except for local authorities in Ampara District, were postponed, for a fourth time, until 23 October 2004.

On 27 January 2006 local authority elections were called for the entire country. It was later announced that elections would be held on 30 March 2006 across the entire country. The Election Commissioner subsequently postponed the elections in the north and Batticaloa District until 30 September 2006. On 23 September 2006 elections in the north and Batticaloa District were postponed until 30 June 2007.

== Election results ==
=== 2011 local government election ===
Results of the local government election held on 17 March 2011:

Alliances and parties	Votes	%	Seats
Tamil National Alliance (EPRLF (S), ITAK, PLOTE, TELO, TULF, TNLA)	3,587	46.85%	5
United People's Freedom Alliance (ACMC, EPDP, SLFP et al.)	2,295	29.98%	2
Sri Lanka Muslim Congress	1,587	20.73%	2
United National Party	118	1.54%	0
Janatha Vimukthi Peramuna	64	0.84%	0
Independent	5	0.07%	0
Valid Votes	7,656	100.00%	9
Rejected Votes	412		
Total Polled	8,068		
Registered Electors	18,925		
Turnout	42.63%		

The following candidates were elected: Gabiriyel Anthony Iya (TNA); Suppaiya Jagatheeswaran (TNA); Nagooran Mahir (SLMC); Irfan Noor Mohamed (UPFA); Mohamed Musthafa Sajideenn (SLMC); Thangarasa Santhiramohan (TNA); Abdul Salam Mohamed Sarook (UPFA); Sivabalasingam Sivaketheesan (TNA); and Thiyagalingam Uthaylingam (TNA).

Gabiriyel Anthony Iya (TNA) and Thangarasa Santhiramohan (TNA) were appointed Chairman and Deputy Chairman respectively.
