= Cheddikulam Hospital =

- Ministry of Health, Northern Province

Geography
- Location: Cheddikulam, Vavuniya District, Northern Province, Sri Lanka
- Coordinates: 8°39′31.10″N 80°18′44.00″E

Organisation
- Care system: Public

Services
- Beds: 425

Links
- Lists: Hospitals in Sri Lanka

Cheddikulam Hospital is a government hospital in Cheddikulam, Sri Lanka. It is controlled by the provincial government in Jaffna. As of 2010 it had 425 beds. The hospital is sometimes called Cheddikulam Base Hospital or Cheddikulam District Hospital.
