= Nedunkerny =

Nedunkerny நெடுங்கேணி
- Town
- Location within Northern Province Location within Sri Lanka
- Coordinates: 9°03′41.2″N 80°39′39.2″E
- Country: Sri Lanka
- Province: Northern
- District: Vavuniya
- Divisional Secretariat: Vavuniya North
- Time zone: UTC+5:30 (Sri Lanka Standard Time Zone)
- Postal Code: 43075

Nedunkerny (Tamil: நெடுங்கேணி, romanized: Neṭuṅkēṇi) (also spelt Nedunkeni, Nedunkerni) is a town in Vavuniya District, Sri Lanka. The roads going through Nedunkerny link Puliyankulam with Oddusuddan, and Puliyankulam with Mullaitivu.

== Religion ==
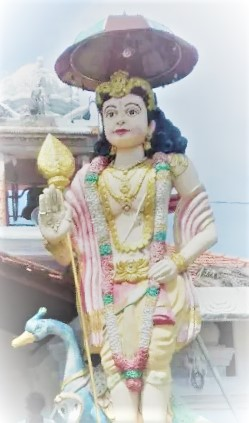
Nedunkerny Murugan

Sri Kathirvelayuthar Temple is a Hindu temple. The temple is also known as Nedunkerny Murugan and is very prestigious amongst its devotees across Vavuniya, Mullativu and Jaffna districts.

During the civilian war, the temple had been severely affected and damaged.

== Education ==
V/ Nedunkerny Maha Vidyalayam is a school in Northern Province. V/ Nedunkerny Maha Vidyalayam is situated in Nedunkerny Town.

=== Schools in Nedunkerny Division ===
- Ananthapuliyankulam G.T.M.S.
- Ayilady G.T.M.S.
- Kanagarayankulam M.V.
- Kana Path Vidyalayam
- Karappukuththy G.T.M.S.
- Katkulam G.T.M.S.
- Koramoddai G.T.M.S.
- Kovilpuliyankulam G.T.M.S.
- Kurisuddakulam G.T.M.S.
- Mamadu Sri Vaani Vidyalayam
- Mannakulam G.T.M.S.
- Maraviluppai G.T.M.S.
- Maruthodai G.T.M.S.
- Muruganantha Vidyalayam
- Nainamadu G.T.M.S.
- Navalar Vidyalayam
- Navaratnam Vidyalayam
- Nochchikulam Muthumary Vidyalayam
- Paddadaipirinthakulam G.T.M.S.
- Paddadaipirinthakulam
- Palayawady G.T.M.S.
- Pandaravanniyan Vidyalayam
- Periyadampan Sri Ganesha Vidyalayam
- Periyakulam G.T.M.S.
- Periyamadu G.T.M.S.
- Puliyankulam Hindu College
- Puthoor G.T.M.S.
- Puthuvilankulam G.T.M.S.
- Selvavinayagar Vidyalayam
- Senaipulavu Umayal Vidyalayam
- Sinnadampan Barathy Vidyalayam
- Sri Ramakrishna Vidyalayam
- Thaninayagam Adikalar Vidyalayam
- Unchalkaddy G.T.M.S.
- Vedivaiththakallu G.T.M.S.
- Velankulam G.T.M.S.
- Vickneswara Maha Vidyalayam
- Vivekanantha Vidyalayam

== See also ==
- Operation Jayasikurui
- Thandikulam–Omanthai offensive
- List of schools in Northern Province, Sri Lanka
- List of attacks on civilians attributed to Sri Lankan government forces
