= Vavuniya Hospital =

- Ministry of Health, Northern Province
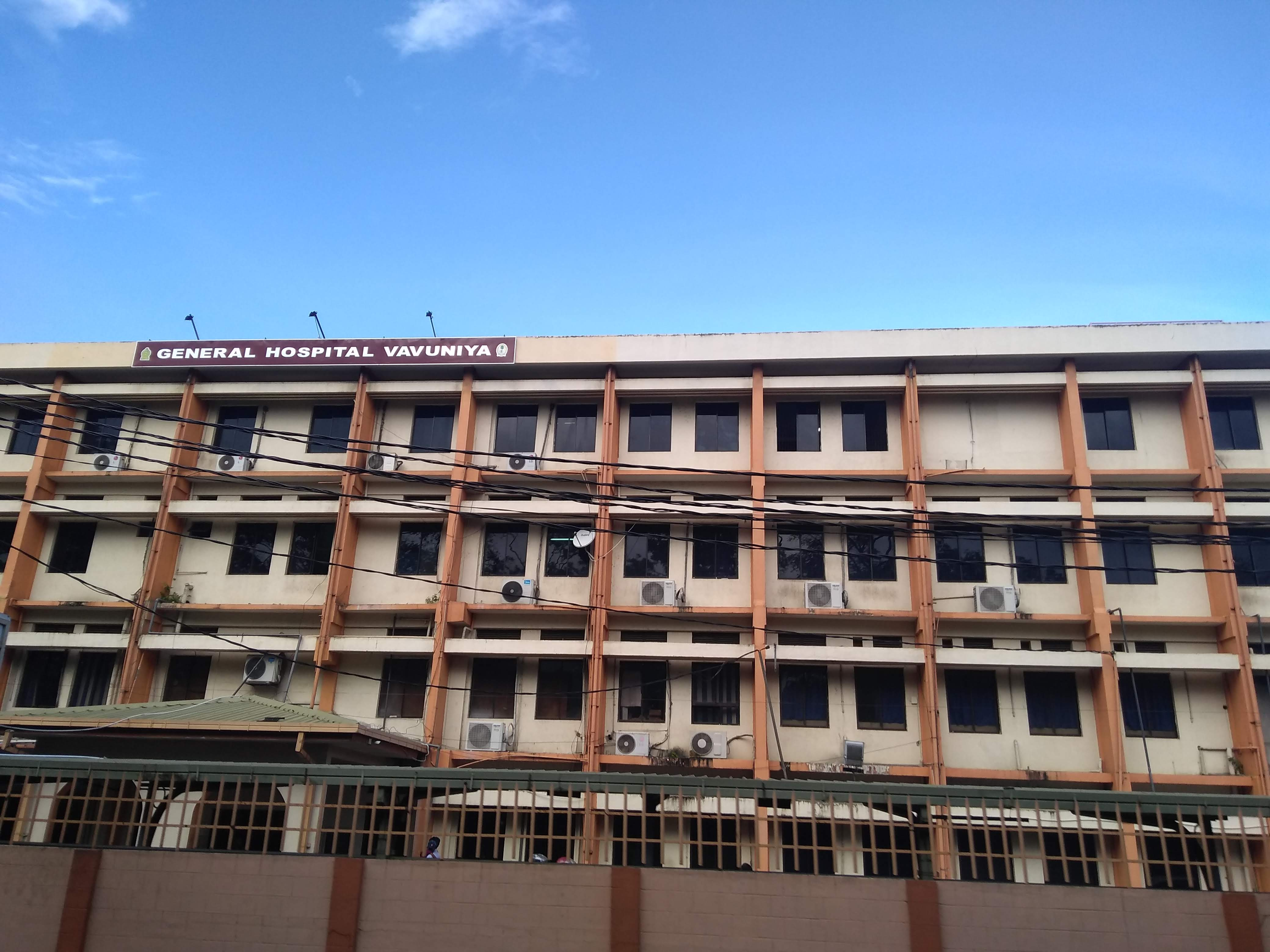

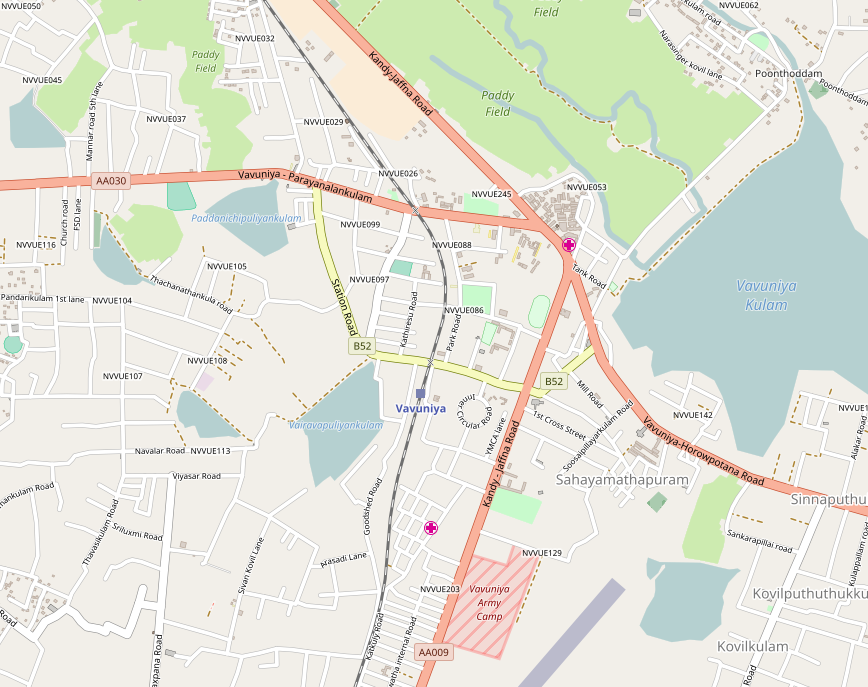
- Location in central Vavuniya

Geography
- Location: Vavuniya, Vavuniya District, Northern Province, Sri Lanka
- Coordinates: 8°45′37.50″N 80°30′00.30″E

Organisation
- Care system: Public

Services
- Beds: 624

Links
- Lists: Hospitals in Sri Lanka

Vavuniya Hospital is a government hospital in Vavuniya, Sri Lanka. It is the leading hospital in Vavuniya District and is controlled by the provincial government in Jaffna. As of 2010 it had 624 beds. The hospital is sometimes called Vavuniya General Hospital or Vavuniya District General Hospital.
