= Vavuniya Divisional Secretariat =

- Divisional Secretariat
- Country: Sri Lanka
- Province: Northern Province
- District: Vavuniya District
- Time zone: UTC+5:30 (Sri Lanka Standard Time)

Vavuniya Divisional Secretariat is a Divisional Secretariat of Vavuniya District, of Northern Province, Sri Lanka.

== Demography-Religion ==
Religion in Vavuniya DS Division (2012)
1. Buddhist (2.60%)
2. Hindu (78.3%)
3. Muslim (4.30%)
4. Roman Catholic (8.70%)
5. Other Christian (6.00%)
6. Other (0.00%)
