= Cheddikulam =

Cheddikulam செட்டிக்குளம் චෙඪ්ඪිකුලම
- Location within Northern Province
- Coordinates: 8°40′0.12″N 80°17′59.9994″E
- Country: Sri Lanka
- Province: Northern Province
- District: Vavuniya
- Divisional Secretariat: Vengalacheddikulam

Population (2013)
  - Total: 701
- Time zone: UTC+5:30 (Sri Lanka Standard Time)

Cheddikulam is a small town in Sri Lanka. It is located within Northern Province.

== See also ==
- Cheddikulam railway station
- List of settlements in Northern Province (Sri Lanka)
