= Vavuniya South Divisional Secretariat =

- Divisional Secretariat
- Interactive map of Vavuniya South Divisional Secretariat
- Country: Sri Lanka
- Province: Northern Province
- District: Vavuniya District
- Time zone: UTC+5:30 (Sri Lanka Standard Time)

Vavuniya South Divisional Secretariat is a Divisional Secretariat of Vavuniya District, of Northern Province, Sri Lanka.

== Demography-Religion ==
Religion in Vavuniya South DS Division (2012)
1. Buddhist (95.5%)
2. Hindu (2.50%)
3. Muslim (0.10%)
4. Roman Catholic (1.60%)
5. Other Christian (0.30%)
6. Other (0.00%)
