= Vengalacheddikulam Divisional Secretariat =

- Divisional Secretariat
- Interactive map of Vengalacheddikulam Divisional Secretariat
- Country: Sri Lanka
- Province: Northern Province
- District: Vavuniya District
- Time zone: UTC+5:30 (Sri Lanka Standard Time)

Vengalacheddikulam Divisional Secretariat is a Divisional Secretariat of Vavuniya District, of Northern Province, Sri Lanka.

== Demography-Religion ==
Religion in Vengalacheddikulam DS Division (2012)
1. Buddhist (2.20%)
2. Hindu (55.8%)
3. Muslim (23.1%)
4. Roman Catholic (15.3%)
5. Other Christian (3.50%)
6. Other (0.00%)
