= Vavuniya North Divisional Secretariat =

- Divisional Secretariat
- Country: Sri Lanka
- Province: Northern Province
- District: Vavuniya District
- Time zone: UTC+5:30 (Sri Lanka Standard Time)

Vavuniya North Divisional Secretariat is a Divisional Secretariat of Vavuniya District, of Northern Province, Sri Lanka.

== Demography-Religion ==
Religion in Vavuniya North DS Division (2012)
1. Buddhist (4.90%)
2. Hindu (89.5%)
3. Muslim (0.10%)
4. Roman Catholic (2.70%)
5. Other Christian (2.50%)
6. Other (0.20%)
