= Internally displaced persons in Sri Lanka =

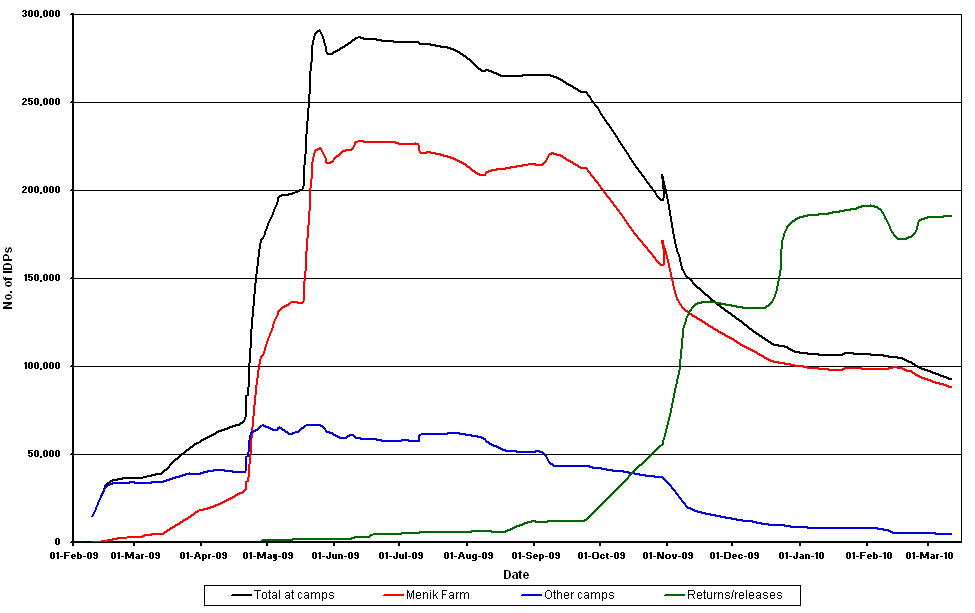
Graph showing numbers of IDPs

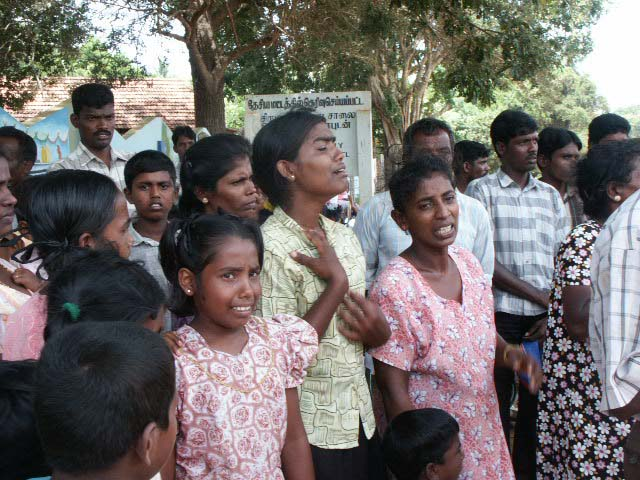
Photo released by the Tamils Rehabilitation Organisation depicting displaced Tamil civilians in Vanni, where much of the last phase of the war took place. The IDPs who almost exclusively consisted of ethnic Tamils from the country's north and east, the territory formerly governed by the LTTE.

The final stages of the Sri Lankan Civil War created 300,000 internally displaced persons (IDPs) who were transferred to camps in Vavuniya District and detained there against their will. This process, together with conditions inside the camps and the slow progress of resettlement attracted much concern and criticism from inside and outside Sri Lanka. On 7 May 2009 the Sri Lankan government announced plans to resettle 80% of the IDPs by the end of 2009. After the end of the civil war Sri Lankan President Mahinda Rajapaksa gave assurances to foreign diplomats that the bulk of the IDPs would be resettled in accordance with the 180-day plan. On 1 December 2009, the IDPs were given limited freedom of movement. The pace of resettlement increased in 2010. The resettlement process was completed and camps were officially closed on 25 September 2012. However, the final batch of IDPs consisting of 110 families were relocated in Kepapilavu in Mullaitivu District-away from their original homes.

Although camps have been removed as of April 2015 as many as 13,459 families, accounting for 44,934 persons, were yet to be resettled and houses for them are still under construction

== Background ==
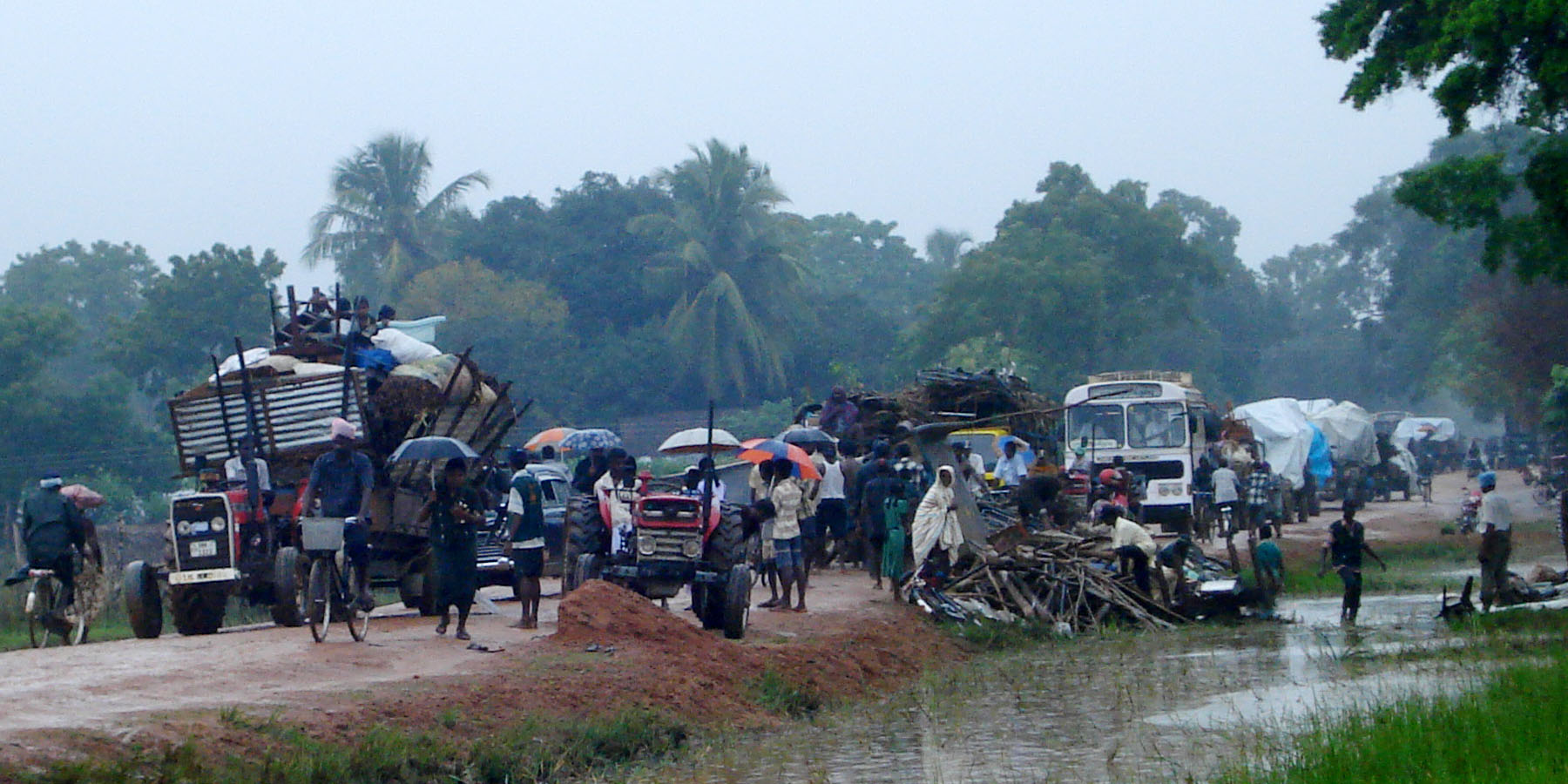
Photo release by the Tamils Rehabilitation Organisation depicting civilians being displaced as a result of the Sri Lanka Army's military offensive. January 2009.

The Liberation Tigers of Tamil Eelam (Tamil Tigers) had been waging a full-scale war for an independent state of Tamil Eelam in the North and East of Sri Lanka since 1983. After the failure of the Norwegian mediated peace process in 2006 the Sri Lankan Military launched military offensives aimed at recapturing the territory controlled by the Tamil Tigers. By July 2007 the military had recaptured all of the Eastern Province. The military offensive in the Northern Province escalated in October 2008 as the military attacked the Vanni heartland of the Tamil Tigers. After successive defeats, including the loss of their de facto capital Kilinochchi, the Tamil Tigers were forced to retreat east. The civilian population of the Vanni also fled east. It is disputed as to whether the civilians fled on their own accord or were forced to do so by the Tamil Tigers. By January 2009 the Tamil Tigers and the civilians were trapped in a small piece of land on the north-east coast in Mullaitivu District.

=== Safe Zone ===
As the Sri Lankan military advanced further into Tamil Tiger controlled areas, international concern grew for the fate of the 350,000 civilians trapped. On 21 January 2009 the Sri Lankan military declared a 32 square kilometres (12 sq mi) Safe Zone 5 kilometres (3.1 mi) north-west of Puthukkudiyiruppu, between the A35 highway and Chalai Lagoon. The purpose of the Safe Zone was ostensibly to allow the trapped civilians to cross into territory controlled by the Sri Lankan military. However, very few civilians actually crossed into the military territory. Again, the reason for this is disputed. The Sri Lankan military, UN and human rights organisations accused the Tamil Tigers of preventing the civilians from leaving.

The fighting between the military and the Tamil Tigers continued, causing the civilians to flee from the Safe Zone to a narrow strip of land between Nanthi Kadal lagoon and the Indian Ocean. On 12 February 2009 the military declared a new 10 square kilometres (3.9 sq mi) Safe Zone in this area, north-west of Mullaitivu town. Over the next three months a brutal siege of the Safe Zone occurred as the military allegedly blitzed by land and air the last remnants of Tamil Tigers trapped in the Safe Zone. Satellite images of the Safe Zone publishes by the UN, foreign governments and scientific organisations showed heavy damage that could have only been caused by bombardment. Inevitably many thousands of civilians were killed or injured. The UN, based on credible witness evidence from aid agencies as well civilians evacuated from the Safe Zone by sea, estimated that 6,500 civilians were killed and another 14,000 injured between mid-January, when the Safe Zone was first declared, and mid-April. There are no official casualty figures after this period but estimates of the death toll for the final four months of the civil war (mid-January to mid-May) range from 15,000 to 20,000. A US State Department report has suggested that the actual casualty figures were probably much higher than the UN's estimates and that significant numbers of casualties weren't recorded. As the civil war edged towards a bitter end in late April/early May the number of civilians leaving the Safe Zone turned from a trickle to a torrent. On 19 May the Sri Lankan government declared victory.

=== IDP camps ===
All civilians who managed to escape the fighting in the Safe Zone and the civilians who were still in the Safe Zone after the end of combat were taken by the Sri Lankan military to southern Vavuniya District and housed in camps, mostly schools. The IDPs weren't allowed to leave the camps. The reasons given by the Sri Lankan government/military for not allowing the civilians to return to their homes were the existence of land mines and the need to identify Tamil Tigers whom they allege are hiding amongst the civilians.

== Terminology ==
The Sri Lankan government/military describes the camps as "welfare centres" or "welfare villages" but the conditions imposed on the IDPs have prompted others, inside and outside Sri Lanka, to use other terms to describe the camps.

Western critics have described the camps as "prisons" or "closed camps" because the IDPs were not permitted to leave the camps.

Some, including the United Nations’ High Commissioner for Human Rights Navanethem Pillay, have gone further and described the camps as "internment camps" because the IDPs were not permitted leave the camps; access to the camps by independent aid organisations, independent media, IDPs relatives and opposition politicians is heavily restricted or denied completely; and the camps are controlled by the Sri Lankan military.

Tamil activists have described the camps as "concentration camps", using an image of IDPs standing behind barbed wire fences to liken the camps to the concentration camps of World War II and Bosnian Civil War. Indian and Tamil MPs, Catholic priests, academics and the Permanent Peoples' Tribunal based in Milan, have also referred to the IDP camps as concentration camps. Booker Prize-winning author Arundhati Roy and Noam Chomsky are other prominent political activists who have used described the IDP camps as concentration camps. Writers for the British newspapers, The Telegraph and The Times have also used the term concentration camps.

== Criticism and concern about the camps ==
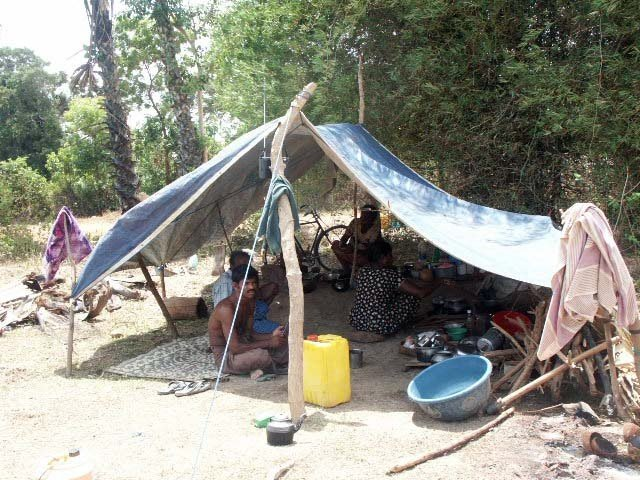
Photo released by the Tamils Rehabilitation Organisation depicting makeshift shelter. Displaced civilians were often forcibly detained in camps lacking even the basic amenities.

The conditions imposed on the IDPs, the conditions inside the camps and the slow progress of resettlement have attracted widespread criticism from inside and outside Sri Lanka.

=== Detention ===
The IDPs were not allowed to leave the camps initially. Human rights groups believe that this effectively meant that the IDPs were being detained indefinitely without charge or trial, in contravention of international law. Articles 9 and 12 of the International Covenant on Civil and Political Rights, to which Sri Lanka is party, guarantee the rights to liberty, freedom from arbitrary detention and freedom of movement.

On 1 December 2009 the camps were opened up, giving the IDPs limited freedom. The IDPs could leave the camps for up to 15 days after giving their details to the authorities but they would have to return to the camps on a stipulated day. Some IDPs could leave the camps permanently but would have to report to the police regularly. The Sri Lankan military has threatened to "track down" IDPs who don't return to camps or report to the police. The camps are being described by some as "open prisons" because of these strict conditions imposed on the IDPs. The UN has given a cautious welcome to the opening up of the camps but reiterated its expectations that all of the IDPs should be returned to their homes permanently by 31 January 2010. Some observers believe the opening up is an election ploy ahead of the presidential elections which are due to be held on 26 January 2010.

=== Access ===
Initially the Sri Lankan military denied all access to the camps by NGOs. This was later relaxed after pressure was exerted by the international community. Many local and international NGOs now work in the camps but they continue to report problems with access. However, human rights groups and others who wish provide advice to the IDPs are still denied access.

Access to the camps by independent media is heavily restricted. When the media are allowed into the camps they are monitored by the military and all contact with the IDPs is filmed by the military.

Access to the camps by the IDPs' relatives is also heavily restricted.

Access to the camps by opposition politicians has been denied completely. However, politicians from the ruling United People's Freedom Alliance regularly visit the camps and meet the IDPs. On most occasions when any IDPs are released or returned to their places of origin they are photographed with government ministers, particularly the paramilitary leader Douglas Devananda.

=== Poor preparation ===
In September 2008 the Sri Lankan government ordered all NGOs out of the Vanni which meant that they weren't on location to provide assistance when the IDPs were transferred from the Safe Zone to the camps.

During the siege of the Safe Zone the Sri Lankan government/military consistently understated the number of civilians trapped in the Safe Zone which meant the NGOs weren't prepared for the influx of 300,000 IDPs into the camps.

=== Flooding ===
The Menik Farm site is very prone to flooding because it lies on low ground near a number of rivers and streams including the Aruvi Aru (Malvathu Oya). In August heavy rains flooded the site, causing heavy damage to the tents housing the IDPs and sending raw sewage into the camps and the rivers providing drinking water. There is widespread concern that the north east monsoon season (October to March) will flood the site.

=== IDPs identified as Tamil Tigers ===
By the end of September 10,000 IDPs had been identified as having some links to the Tamil Tigers. This includes not only former cadres but also their relatives, those who worked in the Tigers's civil administrative structures and anyone believed to be a supporter or sympathizer of the Tigers. They have been moved to separate camps. The conditions imposed on them are even harsher because the Red Cross and UN have been denied access to them. Many of those being detained as Tamil Tigers are children, whom the UN has called on the Sri Lankan government to be released. In June 2011, government claimed that all former female LTTE combatants were released.

== The camps ==
The IDPs were initially held at numerous small camps, mostly schools (Maha Vidyalayam), located throughout southern Vavuniya District. Since then most of these small camps have been closed and IDPs instead concentrated at the Menik Farm site.

Menik Farm is located in the far south-west of Vavuniya District near the district's border with Anuradhapura and Mannar districts. The site straddles the A14 Mannar-Medawachchiya road and the disused Mannar railway line. The site is very close to the Aruvi Aru and other rivers and streams. One of the Aruvi Aru's tributaries actually cuts the site into two. With a population in excess of 200,000 Menik Farm is believed to be the largest IDP camp in the world. It has also become one of Sri Lanka's largest settlements.

The following camps/hospitals are being or have been used to house the IDPs displaced from the Vanni region since October 2008:

=== Vavuniya District ===
==== Vengalachedikulam Divisional Secretary's Division ====
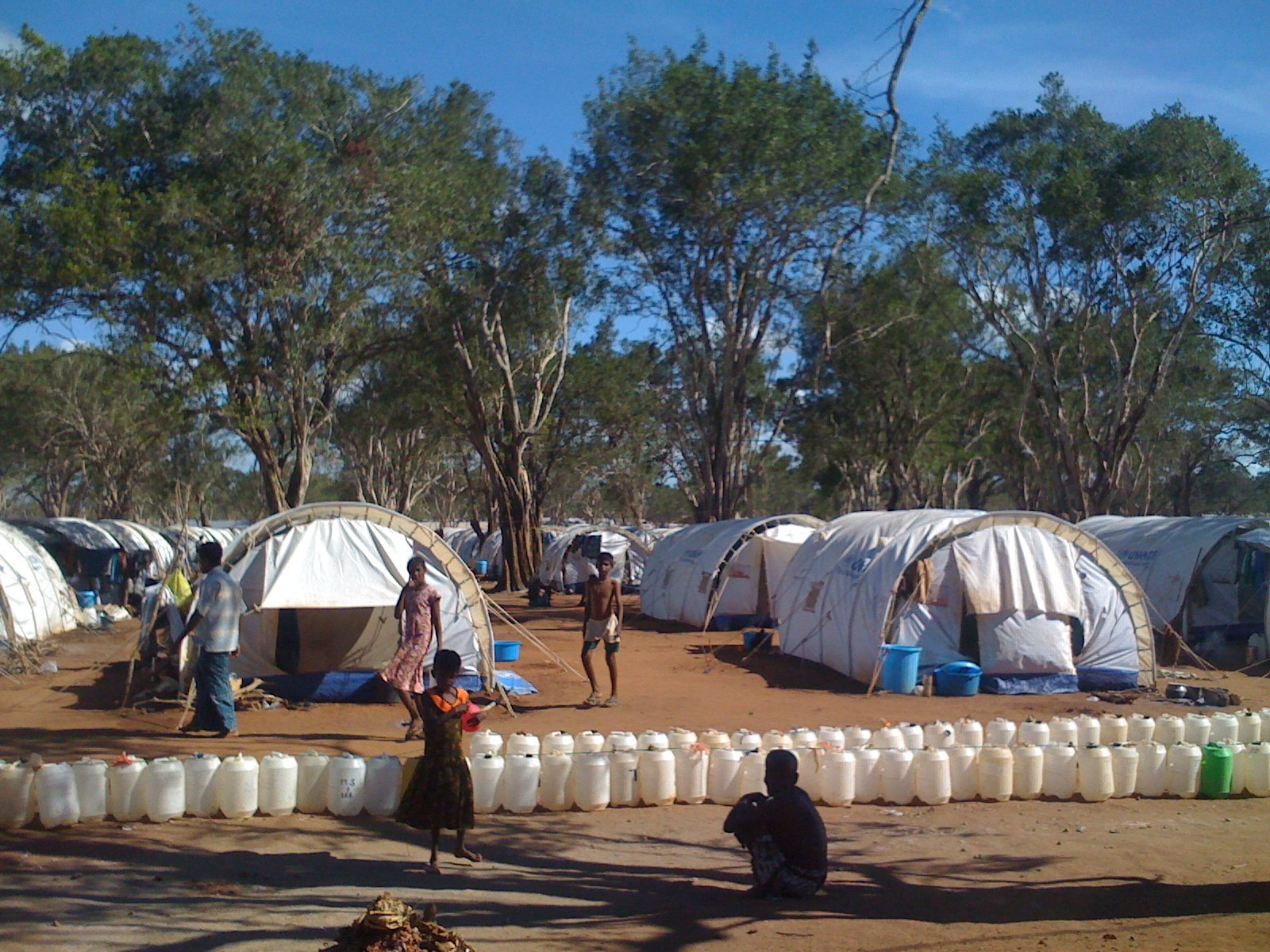
Menik Farm camp, June 2009

- Menik Farm Zone 0 (Kathirkamar Village)
- Menik Farm Zone 1 (Ananda Kumarasamy Village)
- Menik Farm Zone 2 (Pon Ramanathan Village) (closed 24 November 2010, IDPs moved to Menik Farm Zones 0 and 1)
- Menik Farm Zone 3 (Arunachchalam Village)
- Menik Farm Zone 4 (closed 9 November 2010, IDPs moved to Menik Farm Zones 0 and 1)
- Menik Farm Zone 5 (closed February 2010)
- Menik Farm Zone 6
- Menik Farm Zone 7 (Maruthamadu Welfare Centre)
- Andiyapuliyankulam School (closed early May, IDPs moved to Menik Farm Zone 2; closed early September 2009, IDPs moved to Menik Farm Zone 6)
- Ariviththodam Sivanantha Vidyalayam, Menik Farm (closed early September 2009, IDPs moved to Menik Farm Zone 6)
- Cheddikulam Base Hospital
- Cheddikulam Maha Vidyalayam (closed early September 2009, IDPs moved to Menik Farm Zone 6)
- Muthaliyankulam Maha Vidyalayam (closed early May 2009, IDPs moved to Menik Farm Zone 2)
- Sooduventhapualvu Muslim School (closed early September 2009, IDPs moved to Menik Farm Zone 6)
- Sumathipuram Welfare Centre, Ulunkkulam (on border with Anuradhapura district)
- Tharmapuram Welfare Centre (Mahakongaskada (MKK)) (on border with Anuradhapura district) (closed February 2010, IDPs moved to Menik Farm Zones 3 and 1)
- Veerapuram Maha Vidyalayam

==== Vavuniya Divisional Secretary's Division ====
- Gamini Maha Vidyalayam (closed late June 2009, IDPs moved to Sumathipuram WC)
- Kanthapuram Maha Vidyalayam (Scandapuram) (closed late June 2009, IDPs moved to Sumathipuram WC)
- Komarasankulam Maha Vidyalayam
- Kovilkulam Hindu College
- Nelukkulam Kalaimagal Maha Vidyalayam (closed early September 2009, IDPs moved to Menik Farm Zone 6)
- Nelukkulam Technical College
- Omanthai Maha Vidyalayam
- Pampaimadu Hospital
- Pampamadhu Hostel School (closed 27 May 2009, IDPs moved to Menik Farm Zone 4)
- Ponthoodam Government Tamil Mixed School (closed 27 May 2009, IDPs moved to Menik Farm Zone 4)
- Poonathoddam College of Education (closed April 2010)
- Poovarankulam Base Hospital
- Poovarasankulam Maha Vidyalayam (closed early May 2009, IDPs moved to Menik Farm Zone 2)
- Puthukkulam Maha Vidyalayam
- Rambakulam Ladies College (closed early May 2009, IDPs moved to Menik Farm Zone 2)
- Samanankulam School
- Saivapragasa Ladies' College
- Thandikulam Maha Vidyalayam
- Vavuniya General Hospital
- Vavuniya Muslim Maha Vidyalayam
- Vavuniya Tamil Maha Vidyalayam (Primary) (closed 27 May 2009, IDPs moved to Menik Farm Zone 4)
- Vavuniya Tamil Madhya Maha Vidyalayam (Senior) (closed late June 2009, IDPs moved to Sumathipuram WC)
- Velikkulam School

=== Jaffna District ===
- Chavakachcheri Hindu College (closed late May 2009, IDPs moved to Kodikamam Ramavil)
- Chavakachcheri Hindu Ladies College (closed early June 2009, IDPs moved to Kodikamam Ramavil)
- Kaithady Ayurvedic University Hostel
- Kaithady Palmyra Research Institute 1
- Kaithady Palmyra Research Institute 2
- Kaithady Hindu Children Home
- Kodikamam Government Tamil Mixed School
- Kodikamam Ramavil (Kodikamam Forest)
- Kodikamam Thirunavitkarasu Maha Vidyalayam (closed late May 2009, IDPs moved to Kodikamam Ramavil)
- Kopay Teacher Training College
- Manalkadu
- Murusivil Roman Catholic Tamil Mixed School
- Nelliyady Central College (closed early June 2009, IDPs moved to Kodikamam Ramavil)
- Thirunagar Old Court House

=== Mannar District ===
- English Training Centre
- Illupaikkulam (closed March 2010, IDPs moved to Kalimoddai)
- Kalimoddai
- Mannar District General Hospital
- Mannar Welfare Centre
- Sirukandal (closed March 2010, IDPs moved to Kalimoddai)

=== Trincomalee District ===
- Arafat Nagar Muslim Maha Vidyalam
- Kantale Base Hospital
- Methodist School
- Pulmoddai Field Hospital
- Pulmoddai Muslim Maha Vidyalayam
- Pulmoddai Sinhala Maha Vidyalayam
- Sahanagama Welfare Centre Site 1, Pulmoddai (13th Mile post)
- Sahanagama Welfare Centre Site 2, Pulmoddai (13th Mile post)
- Thampalakamam Peripheral Unit
- Trincomalee General Hospital

A number of hospitals in other districts have also been used by the IDPs.

== Release/return to places of origiAn n ==
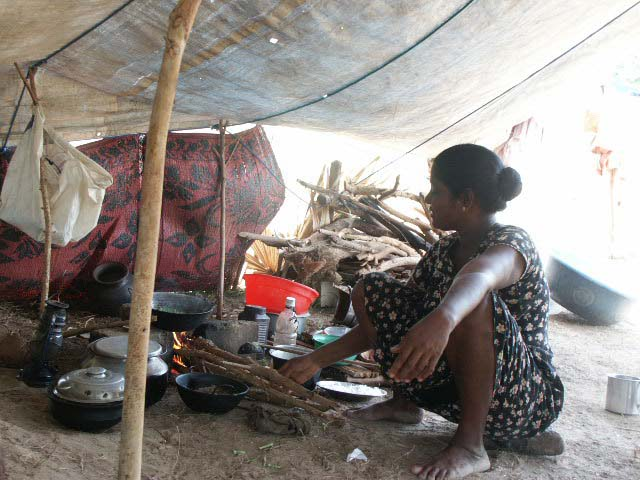
An IDP in a temporary kitchen

When the camps were initially established in early 2009 the Sri Lankan government stated that it expected to hold the IDPs in the camps for as long as three years. However, on 7 May 2009 the Sri Lankan government announced plans to resettle 80% of the IDPs by the end of 2009. This was reinforced on 21 May 2009 when President Rajapaksa gave assurances that most of the civilians would be resettled within 180 days.

By July the resettlement target was being revised downwards. On 10 July President Rajapaksa stated that there was target, not a promise, to resettle 50-60% of the IDPs by the end of November 2009. However, on 16 July 2009 in a letter of intent to the International Monetary Fund (IMF) the Sri Lankan government stated that it aimed to resettle 70-80% of the IDPs by the end of 2009. The IMF subsequently approved a US$2.6 billion loan to Sri Lanka.

By the end of August 2009 less than 12,000 IDPs (5%) had been released or returned to their places of origin. The imminent monsoon raised concern amongst the aid agencies/international community. The Sri Lankan government reacted to this by returning more IDPs to their places of origin. Some of these IDPs were held in military run "closed" transit sites in their home districts, from which they can't leave and access by aid agencies is heavily restricted. Some IDPs were allowed to return to their homes but most of these homes are located inside high security zones, such as the Jaffna islands, which are under the strict control of Sri Lankan Navy. The Sri Lankan military places heavy restrictions on civilians living inside these areas and on access to them from outside.

By early October the resettlement target had been reduced even further. On 6 October 2009 a Sri Lanka's Deputy Finance Minister Sarath Amunugama issued a statement saying the government hoped to resettle 100,000 (35%) of the IDPs by the end of 2009. In late October the government accelerated the resettlement programme by returning IDPs to areas formerly controlled by the Tamil Tigers in Kilinochchi, Mannar and Mullaitivu districts. On 22 October 2009 the Sri Lankan government claimed to have released of 41,685 IDPs (16,394 from Mullaitivu District, 10,017 from Kilinochchi District, 8,643 from Vavuniya District and 6,631 from Mannar District), which was widely reported in the media. However, other reports suggested that only 5,700 IDPs had been released, with another 36,000 to be resettled over the "coming weeks". This was later confirmed by UN figures which showed that only 25,474 IDPs had been released/returned to places of origin between 10 and 23 October. Of those who were actually released some were returned to the IDP camps after the end of the photo-opportunity for government ministers, whilst others were taken to transit camps in their home districts, not their homes. The apparent fast pace of resettlement in October 2009 and early November 2009 was due to IDP's being returned to areas that have been under government control for many years (Jaffna, Mannar and Vavuniya). Most of the IDPs in the camps from these areas had been returned to their places of origin by November. The pace of resettlement in areas controlled by the Tamil Tigers (Kilinochchi and Mullaitivu) has been very slow, particularly in areas east of the A 9 highway. Consequently, the pace of resettlement had slowed down by late November. On 29 December 2009 the Sri Lankan government stated that there was no deadline for the resettlement of the IDPs, contradicting previous assurances.

The pace of resettlement increased in 2010. The camps were officially closed on 25 September 2012.

Cumulative numbers of IDPs displaced from the Vanni since October 2008 who have been released or returned to places of origin from IDP camps:

Date^{1}	Returned to Places of Origin^{2}										Released	Total
Date^{1}	Jaffna District	Kilino -chchi District	Mannar District	Mullaitivu District	Vavuniya District	Ampara District	Batticaloa District	Trinco -malee District	Others/ Institutions	Total	Released	Total
28 April 2011	64,275	118,954	83,885	69,480	35,275					371,869		371,869
2 December 2010	64,275	115,417	55,790	61,893	28,445					325,820		325,820
8 October 2010	63,009	110,637	50,367	51,578	27,615					303,206		303,206
26 August 2010	67,712	104,115	26,208	48,104	33,511	688	2,905	7,500	1,338	292,081		292,081
14 July 2010												270,159
20 May 2010												236,755
2 May 2010												214,227
15 April 2010												205,983
26 March 2010												198,110
11 March 2010	71,486	30,404	16,927	20,244	33,710	688	2,905	7,500	1,263	185,127		185,127
25 February 2010	71,486	27,925	15,802	15,888	39,799	688	2,910	7,994	1,263	183,755		183,755
18 February 2010	71,486	21,913	15,682	15,501	38,348	679	2,912	7,604	1,257	175,382		175,382
14 February 2010	71,486	20,532	14,529	15,499	38,348	685	2,902	7,604	1,257	172,842		172,842
5 February 2010	69,541	18,741	10,316	12,731	38,348	808	2,902	7,604	71	161,062	29,060	190,122
22 January 2010	69,541	17,509	10,173	12,731	38,348	626	2,892	7,604	71	159,495	29,008	188,503
15 January 2010	69,541	17,509	9,437	12,736	38,146	626	2,892	7,604	71	158,562	28,973	187,535
31 December 2009	69,526	17,700	9,083	11,276	37,719	626	2,833	7,108	71	155,942	28,854	184,796
24 December 2009	69,174	15,103	9,050	10,518	32,155	626	2,833	7,108	71	146,638	28,743	175,381
21 December 2009	69,174	12,511	8,460	10,190	31,635	626	2,795	7,108	71	142,570	28,162	170,732
18 December 2009	69,174	12,511	8,460	10,190	31,635	626	2,795	7,108	71	142,570	27,663	170,233
19 November 2009										112,209	27,663	139,872
13 November 2009	60,560	1,774	5,930	5,489	18,267	581	2,565	7,108	57	108,331	26,508	134,839
7 November 2009										102,728	24,974	127,702
5 November 2009	50,539	0	3,764	2,048	6,744	581	2,339	7,108	57	73,180	24,974	98,154
1 November 2009	50,539	0	3,764	2,048	6,744	581	2,339	7,108	57	73,180	19,479	92,569
28 October 2009										35,822	19,479	55,301
23 October 2009										35,822	16,490	52,312
9 October 2009										13,502	13,336	26,838
28 September 2009										6,813	7,835	14,648
24 September 2009										5,153	7,835	12,988
14 September 2009										5,153	6,615	11,768
9 September 2009										5,123	6,615	11,738
28 August 2009										5,123	6,490	11,613
8 August 2009											6,237	6,237
29 July 2009											5,980	5,980
17 July 2009											5,852	5,852
10 July 2009											5,483	5,483
3 July 2009											5,104	5,104
26 June 2009											4,433	4,433
18 June 2009											3,068	3,068
16 June 2009											3,054	3,054
8 June 2009											2,234	2,234
21 May 2009											1,537	1,537
18 May 2009											1,535	1,535
14 May 2009											1,534	1,534
13 May 2009											1,524	1,524
12 May 2009											1,515	1,515
28 April 2009											1,252	1,252

1 Figures are the latest available on date. 2 Since 5 August 2009.

== Number remaining at camps ==
Numbers of IDPs displaced from the Vanni since October 2008 who continue to reside at the camps:

Date^{1}	Vavuniya District			Jaffna District	Mannar District	Trincomalee District	Other Districts	Total
Date^{1}	Vengalachedikulam DSD		Vavuniya DSD	Jaffna District	Mannar District	Trincomalee District	Other Districts	Total
Date^{1}	Menik Farm	Other Camps	Vavuniya DSD	Jaffna District	Mannar District	Trincomalee District	Other Districts	Total
6 June 2011	7,444	0	0	0	0	0	0	7,444
28 April 2011	20,153	0	0	1,179	0	0	0	17,785
2 December 2010	16,606	0	0	1,179	0	0	0	21,332
8 October 2010	25,051	0	0	1,593	0	0	0	26,644
26 August 2010	32,707	0	0	2,239	0	0	0	34,946
29 July 2010	38,026	0	0	2,462	0	0	0	40,488
20 May 2010	60,900	0	0	3,193	0	0	0	64,093
29 April 2010	73,022	0	0	3,361	185	0	0	76,568
15 April 2010	78,946	0	0	3,400	185	0	0	82,531
26 March 2010	78,335	0	0	3,400	184	0	0	81,919
11 March 2010	88,198	0	0	3,607	1,023	0	0	92,828
25 February 2010	93,926	0	0	3,607	1,533	0	0	99,066
22 February 2010	95,820	0	0	3,607	1,592	0	0	101,019
11 February 2010	99,653	0	0	3,607	1,592	0	0	104,852
5 February 2010	98,503	2,464	0	3,607	1,945	0	0	106,519
20 January 2010	99,088	2,558	0	3,607	1,950	0	0	107,203
17 January 2010	98,010	2,556	0	3,607	1,950	0	0	106,123
31 December 2009	99,837	2,566	0	3,607	2,096	0	0	108,106
24 December 2009	101,722	3,655	0	3,987	2,162	0	0	111,526
17 December 2009	103,755	4,356	0	3,987	1,727	200	0	114,025
19 November 2009								138,226
13 November 2009	128,528	8,311	1,007	2,736	2,539	3,362	89	146,572
5 November 2009	138,280	9,150	5,763	2,816	2,416	6,966	89	165,480
29 October 2009	171,511	12,058	7,832	7,401	2,416	6,966	89	208,273
28 October 2009	158,086	12,058	7,832	7,401	2,416	6,966	89	194,848
26 October 2009								205,412
23 October 2009								222,341
9 October 2009								247,073
24 September 2009	212,650	15,896	10,978	7,411	1,826	6,734	89	255,584
23 September 2009	212,650	15,896	10,979	7,411	1,826	6,734	89	255,585
9 September 2009	220,914	16,369	11,177	7,378	1,794	6,862	89	264,583
4 September 2009	214,577	22,483	12,327	7,378	1,794	6,816	89	265,464
28 August 2009	214,606	22,483	12,327	7,378	1,794	6,816	89	265,493
18 August 2009	212,484	22,650	12,931	7,773	1,891	6,818	141	264,688
10 August 2009	210,982	22,650	14,575	10,861	1,977	6,818	141	268,004
7 August 2009	208,472	22,706	17,266	10,861	1,977	6,818	141	268,241
28 July 2009	216,726	22,724	19,152	10,861	1,694	6,864	518	278,539
17 July 2009	221,119	22,217	19,152	10,861	1,694	6,864	518	282,425
10 July 2009	221,666	22,326	19,176	10,861	1,678	6,864	518	283,089
9 July 2009	226,297	18,378	19,290	10,861	1,678	6,864	518	283,886
3 July 2009	226,297	18,378	19,290	10,956	1,678	6,866	518	283,983
30 June 2009	226,667	17,405	19,853	10,956	1,678	6,730	518	283,807
26 June 2009	227,243	17,405	19,853	10,956	1,972	6,730	518	284,677
18 June 2009	227,005	17,113	20,669	10,956	2,030	6,764	1,257	285,794
16 June 2009	227,005	17,113	20,669	10,956	1,945	6,764	1,257	285,709
11 June 2009	227,738	11,137	26,842	11,069	2,777	6,892	583	287,038
8 June 2009	223,230	10,100	29,804	11,069	2,777	6,892	583	284,455
4 June 2009	222,126	6,537	31,405	11,063	2,741	6,892	583	281,347
29 May 2009	215,187	6,563	34,537	11,086	2,741	6,892	496	277,502
28 May 2009	215,187	6,563	34,537	11,086	2,741	6,892	583	277,589
25 May 2009	223,895	6,563	38,959	11,086	2,483	6,893	583	290,462
22 May 2009	221,014	6,563	38,959	11,086	2,483	6,837	583	287,525
21 May 2009	206,074	6,563	38,959	11,086	2,483	6,837	583	272,585
18 May 2009	153,884	6,563	39,241	11,086	2,483	6,374	583	220,214
17 May 2009	136,917	5,909	39,241	11,079	2,245	6,374	582	202,347
14 May 2009	136,532	2,944	39,241	11,086	2,245	6,374	582	199,004
13 May 2009	136,428	2,944	39,241	11,086	2,245	6,374	582	198,900
11 May 2009	136,469	2,944	39,237	11,079	1,997	5,889	391	198,006
6 May 2009	131,588	5,568	40,326	11,089	1,997	5,872	392	196,832
5 May 2009	129,109	5,568	38,871	11,089	1,997	5,872	392	192,898
4 May 2009	125,324	5,584	39,169	11,089	1,997	5,674	392	189,229
29 April 2009	106,608	6,134	41,045	11,089	1,997	5,664	571	173,108
28 April 2009	105,645	6,134	40,892	11,089	1,997	5,660	571	171,988
26 April 2009	93,038	6,134	44,006	11,066	1,997	234	571	157,046
23 April 2009	49,580	5,549	41,545	11,066	1,863	234	449	110,286
22 April 2009	34,500	2,407	33,929	10,187	1,863	234	449	83,569
21 April 2009	34,500	2,407	33,929	10,187	1,863	234	449	83,569
20 April 2009	29,403	2,407	29,772	5,741	1,135	234	407	69,099
8 April 2009	21,653	2,533	31,432	5,741	1,135	318	407	63,219
31 March 2009	18,340	2,596	28,999	5,504	1,135	517	433	57,524
30 March 2009	18,340	2,596	28,999	5,015	1,135	545	431	57,061
24 March 2009	13,188	2,596	29,039	5,015	1,135	545	431	51,949
13 March 2009	4,679	2,584	26,273	3,426	1,135	621	268	38,986
11 March 2009	4,679	2,584	25,997	3,426	1,135	621	268	38,710
6 March 2009	4,212	2,581	25,841	2,606	1,135	822	277	37,474
4 March 2009	3,344	2,581	26,478	2,366	1,133	653	277	36,832
2 March 2009	2,791	2,549	26,940	2,155	1,133	744	277	36,589
27 February 2009	2,791	2,549	26,940	2,155	1,133	832	246	36,646
25 February 2009	2,768	2,546	27,015	2,076	854	878	114	36,251
16 February 2009	1,353	2,205	27,183	2,067	854			33,662
11 February 2009		2,205	17,797					20,002
9 February 2009		2,205	12,671					14,876

1 Figures are the latest available on date.
