= Vavuniya District =

Vavuniya District வவுனியா மாவட்டம் වවුනියා දිස්ත්‍රික්කය
- Administrative District
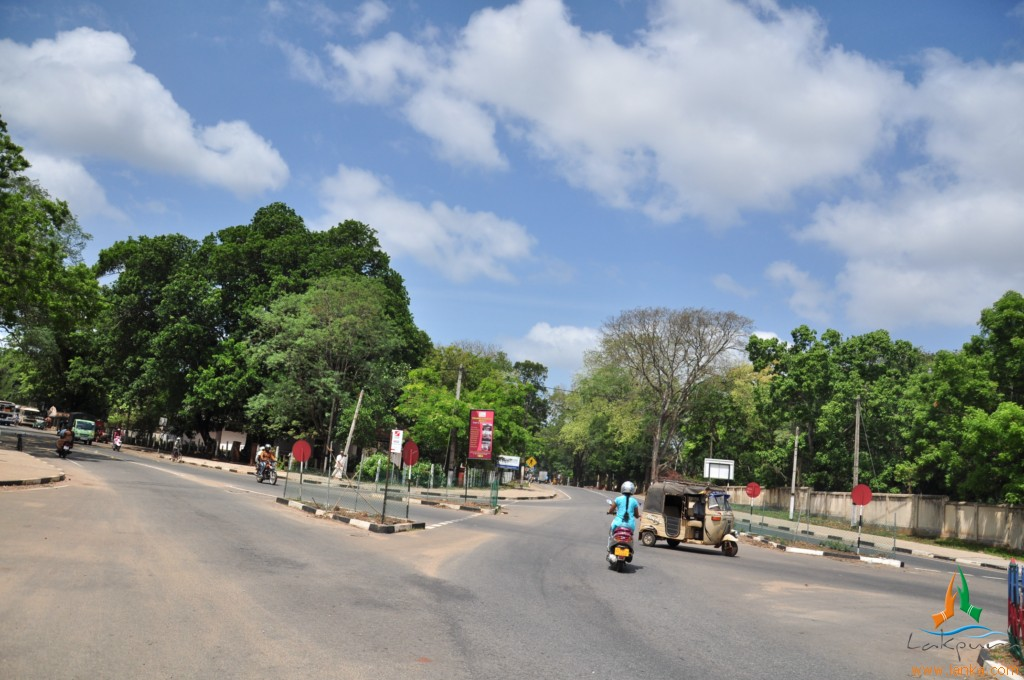
- Vavuniya

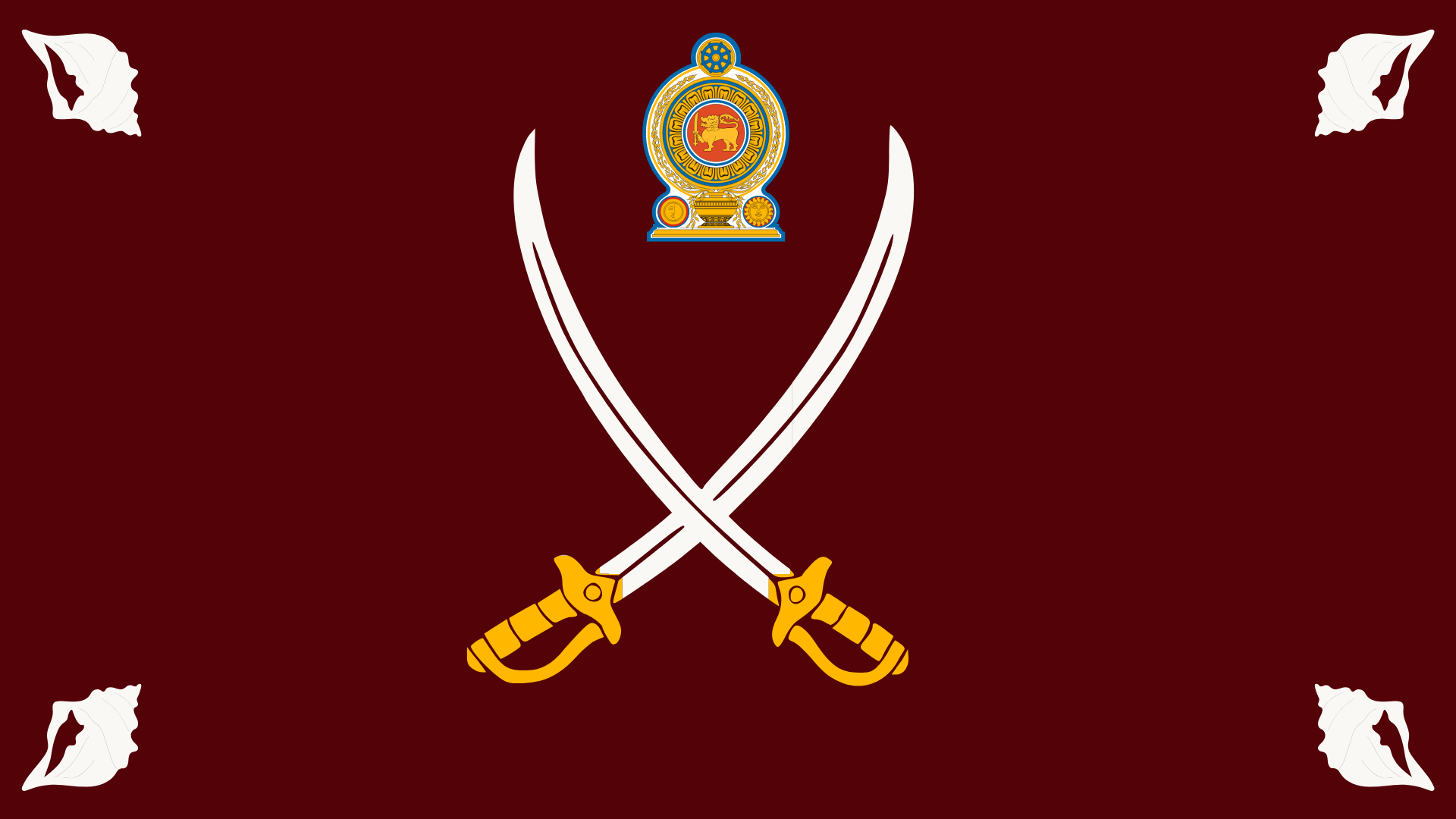
- Flag

- Location within Sri Lanka

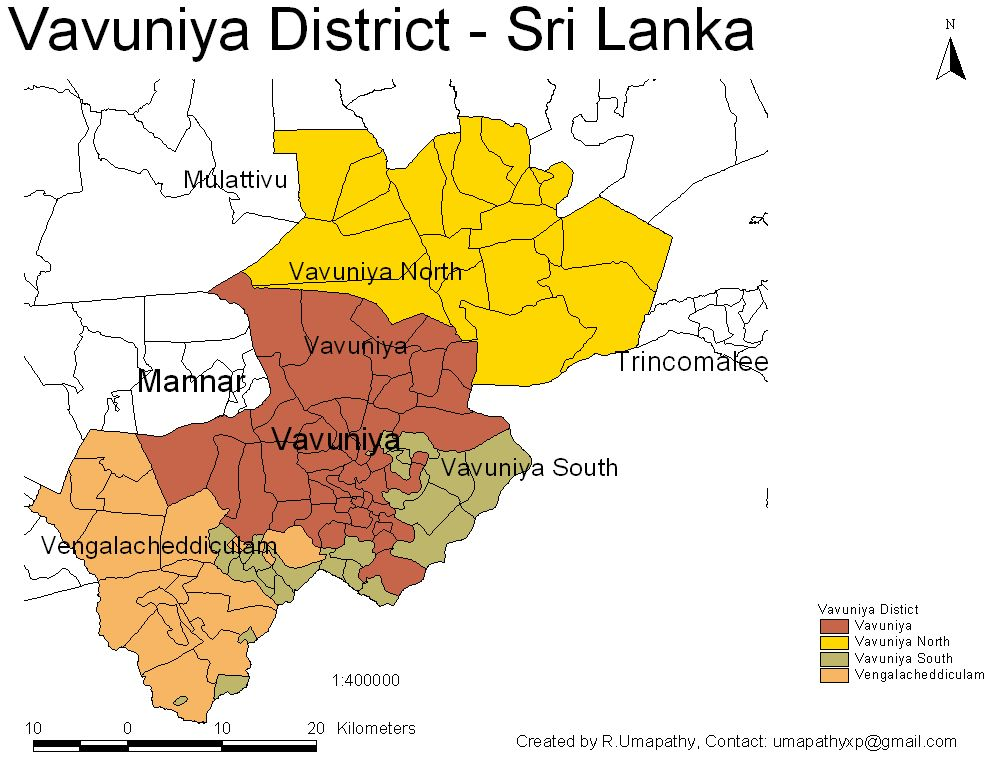
- DS and GN Divisions of Vavuniya District, 2006
- Coordinates: 08°50′N 80°30′E
- Country: Sri Lanka
- Province: Northern
- Capital: Vavuniya
- DS Division: List: Vavuniya; Vavuniya North; Vavuniya South; Venkalacheddikulam

Government
  - District Secretary: S. M. Saman Bandulasena
  - MPs: List: Selvam Adaikalanathan; Sivasakthy Ananthan; Rishad Bathiudeen; Hunais Farook; Muthali Bawa Farook; Vino Noharathalingam
  - MPCs: List: R. Indrarajah; A. Jayathilaka; K. T. Linganathan; P. Sathiyalingam; A. D. D. Senevirathna; M. Thiyagarajah

Area
  - Total: 1,967 km^{2} (759 sq mi)
  - Land: 1,861 km^{2} (719 sq mi)
  - Water: 106 km^{2} (41 sq mi) 5.39%
  - Rank: 15th (3.00% of total area)

Population (2012 census)
  - Total: 171,511
  - Rank: 22nd (0.85% of total pop.)
  - Density: 92.16/km^{2} (238.7/sq mi)

Ethnicity (2012 census)
  - Sri Lankan Tamil: 141,269 (82.37%)
  - Sinhalese: 17,191 (10.02%)
  - Sri Lankan Moors: 11,700 (6.82%)
  - Indian Tamil: 1,292 (0.75%)
  - Other: 59 (0.03%)

Religion (2012 census)
  - Hindu: 119,286 (69.55%)
  - Christian: 22,820 (13.31%)
  - Buddhist: 16,688 (9.73%)
  - Muslim: 12,341 (7.20%)
  - Other: 376 (0.22%)
- Time zone: UTC+05:30 (Sri Lanka)
- Post Codes: 43000-43999
- Telephone Codes: 024
- ISO 3166 code: LK-44
- Vehicle registration: NP
- Official Languages: Tamil, Sinhala
- Website: Vavuniya District Secretariat

Vavuniya District (Tamil: வவுனியா மாவட்டம் Vavuṉiyā Māvaṭṭam; Sinhala: වවුනියා දිස්ත්‍රික්කය) is one of the 25 districts of Sri Lanka, the second level administrative division of the country. The district is administered by a District Secretariat headed by a District Secretary (previously known as a Government Agent) appointed by the central government of Sri Lanka. The capital of the district is the city of Vavuniya.

== History ==
Between 5th century BC and 13th century AD, present day Vavuniya District was part of the Rajarata historical region. Vavuniya District was thereafter ruled by Vanniar Chieftains who paid tribute to the pre-colonial Jaffna kingdom. The district then came under Portuguese, Dutch and British control. In 1815 the British gained control of the entire island of Ceylon. They divided the island into three ethnic based administrative structures: Low Country Sinhalese, Kandyan Sinhalese and Tamil. The district, which was then called Vanni District, was part of the Tamil administration. In 1833, in accordance with the recommendations of the Colebrooke-Cameron Commission, the ethnic based administrative structures were unified into a single administration divided into five geographic provinces. Vanni District, together with Jaffna District and Mannar District, formed the new Northern Province.

Vanni District was later renamed Mullaitivu District and then Vavuniya District. At the time that Ceylon gained independence, Vavuniya was one of the three districts located in the Northern Province. Mullaitivu District was carved out of the northern part of Vavuniya District in September 1978.

Parts of Vavuniya District were under the control of rebel Liberation Tigers of Tamil Eelam for many years during the civil war. The entire district was recaptured by the Sri Lankan military in 2008.

== Geography ==
Vavuniya District is located in the north of Sri Lanka in the Northern Province. It has an area of 1,967 square kilometres (759 sq mi).

== Administrative units ==
Vavuniya District is divided into 4 Divisional Secretary's Division (DS Divisions), each headed by a Divisional Secretary (previously known as an Assistant Government Agent). The DS Divisions are further sub-divided into 102 Grama Niladhari Divisions (GN Divisions).

DS Division	Main Town	Divisional Secretary	GN Divisions	Area (km^{2})	Population (2012 Census)						Population Density (/km^{2})
DS Division	Main Town	Divisional Secretary	GN Divisions	Area (km^{2})	Sri Lankan Tamil	Sinhalese	Sri Lankan Moors	Indian Tamil	Other	Total	Population Density (/km^{2})
Vavuniya	Vavuniya	K. Uthayarajah	42	614	107,668	3,424	4,868	1,167	26	117,153	191
Vavuniya North	Nedunkerny	K. Paranthaman	20	745	10,830	554	7	103	24	11,518	15
Vavuniya South		M. S. Janaka	20	200	518	12,546	3	2	1	13,070	65
Venkalacheddikulam	Cheddikulam	N. Kamalathasan	20	408	22,253	667	6,822	20	8	29,770	73
Total			102	1,967	141,269	17,191	11,700	1,292	59	171,511	87

== Demographics ==
=== Population ===
Vavuniya District's population was 171,511 in 2012. The population of the district is mostly Sri Lankan Tamil.

The population of the district, like the rest of the north and east of Sri Lanka, has been heavily affected by the civil war. The war killed an estimated 100,000 people. Several hundred thousand Sri Lankan Tamils, possibly as much as one million, emigrated to the West during the war. Many Sri Lankan Tamils also moved to the relative safety of the capital Colombo. Most of the Sri Lankan Moors and Sinhalese who lived in the district fled to other parts of Sri Lanka or were forcibly expelled by the rebel Liberation Tigers of Tamil Eelam, though most of them have returned to the district since the end of the civil war.

=== Ethnicity ===
Population of Vavuniya District by ethnic group 1881 to 2012
Year	Tamil (Note: Sri Lankan Tamil and Indian Tamil.)		Sinhalese		Muslim (Note: Sri Lankan Moors and Indian Moors.)		Other		Total No.
Year	No.	%	No.	%	No.	%	No.	%	Total No.
1881 Census	13,164	84.55%	1,157	7.43%	1,133	7.28%	115	0.74%	15,569
1891 Census	13,030	84.06%	1,199	7.73%	1,139	7.35%	133	0.86%	15,501
1901 Census	12,726	83.95%	1,128	7.44%	1,069	7.05%	236	1.56%	15,159
1911 Census	14,059	81.10%	1,848	10.66%	1,241	7.16%	188	1.08%	17,336
1921 Census	14,978	80.07%	2,215	11.84%	1,345	7.19%	168	0.90%	18,706
1946 Census	17,071	73.44%	3,870	16.65%	2,153	9.26%	152	0.65%	23,246
1963 Census	51,410	75.05%	12,020	17.55%	4,900	7.15%	170	0.25%	68,500
1971 Census	73,010	76.42%	15,541	16.27%	6,665	6.98%	320	0.33%	95,536
1981 Census	73,133	76.26%	15,876	16.55%	6,640	6.92%	255	0.27%	95,904
1990 Estimate	n/a	n/a	n/a	n/a	n/a	n/a	n/a	n/a	129,895
1998 Estimate	n/a	n/a	n/a	n/a	n/a	n/a	n/a	n/a	129,655
1999 Estimate	n/a	n/a	n/a	n/a	n/a	n/a	n/a	n/a	132,737
2000 Estimate	n/a	n/a	n/a	n/a	n/a	n/a	n/a	n/a	145,159
2001 Estimate (Note: 2001 Census was not carried out in Vavuniya District.)	123,268	88.64%	12,159	8.45%	8,471	5.89%	42	0.03%	143,940
2002 Estimate	121,635	84.34%	13,196	9.15%	9,389	6.51%	0	0.00%	144,220
2003 Estimate	123,704	83.99%	14,386	9.77%	9,192	6.24%	0	0.00%	147,292
2004 Estimate	127,604	84.43%	14,699	9.73%	8,839	5.85%	0	0.00%	151,142
2005 Estimate	n/a	n/a	n/a	n/a	n/a	n/a	n/a	n/a	180,949
2006 Estimate	n/a	n/a	n/a	n/a	n/a	n/a	n/a	n/a	182,808
2007 Estimate	157,917	86.27%	13,535	7.39%	11,594	6.33%	0	0.00%	183,046
2008 Estimate	152,927	86.67%	13,423	7.61%	10,090	5.72%	0	0.00%	176,440
2009 Estimate	179,850	86.93%	16,177	7.82%	10,858	5.25%	0	0.00%	206,885
2011 Enumeration	136,665	82.90%	16,555	10.04%	11,491	6.97%	141	0.09%	164,852
2012 Census	142,561	83.12%	17,191	10.02%	11,700	6.82%	59	0.03%	171,511

=== Religion ===
Population of Vavuniya District by religion 1981 to 2012
Year	Hindu		Christian (Note: Roman Catholic and Other Christian.)		Buddhist		Islam		Others		Total No.
Year	No.	%	No.	%	No.	%	No.	%	No.	%	Total No.
1981 Census	65,574	68.72%	7,338	7.69%	15,754	16.51%	6,740	7.06%	22	0.02%	95,428
2012 Census	119,286	69.55%	22,820	13.31%	16,688	9.73%	12,341	7.20%	376	0.22%	171,511

== Politics and government ==
=== Local government ===
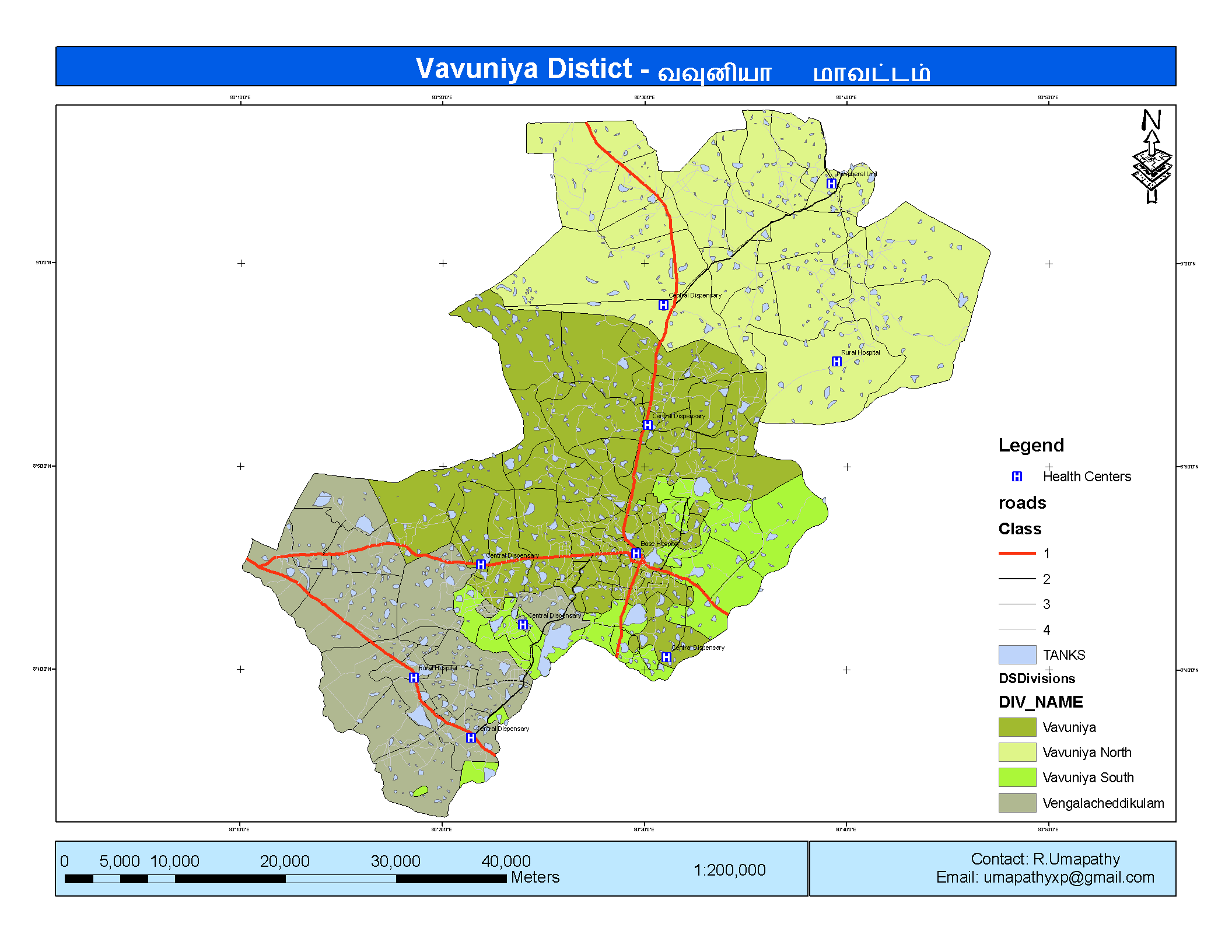
DS Divisions of Vavuniya District, 2006

Vavuniya District has 5 local authorities of which one is an Urban Council and the remaining 4 are Divisional Councils (Pradesha Sabhai or Pradeshiya Sabha).

Local Authority	Area (km^{2})	Population (2011)	Registered Electors (2011) (Note: 2009 for Vavuniya Urban Council.)	Elected Members (2011) (Note: 2009 for Vavuniya Urban Council.)					
Local Authority	Area (km^{2})	Population (2011)	Registered Electors (2011)	TNA (Note: Includes DPLF.)	UPFA	UNP	SLMC	Other	Total
Vavuniya North Divisional Council	769.60	10,392	10,955	8	4	1	0	0	13
Vavuniya South Sinhala Divisional Council	188.50	12,382	9,633	0	7	1	0	1	9
Vavuniya South Tamil Divisional Council	588.20	76,242	48,477	7	2	1	0	0	10
Vavuniya Municipal Council	23.50	31,699	24,626	8	2	0	1	0	11
Venkalacheddikulam Divisional Council	412.98	30,609	18,925	5	2	0	2	0	9
Total	1,982.78	161,324		28	17	3	3	1	52
