= List of villages in Portuguese Ceylon =

Wikimedia list article

Portuguese Ceylon is the name given to the territories controlled by the Portuguese Empire on Ceylon, today Sri Lanka. Portuguese authorities maintained the traditional subdivisions inherited from the Kotte Kingdom (occupied from 1597), the korale (in Portuguese - Corla), and from the Jaffna kingdom (occupied in 1619), the province. The main source to this list are the Portuguese Thombos, from 1615 to 1619 (Kotte) and 1645 (Jaffna).

== Jafanapatão - Jaffna Kingdom ==
Under the Portuguese, the Jaffna Kingdom was organised into five provinces: Beligamo, Baddamarache, Temerache, Pachelapaly, and Ilhas (Islands).

=== Province of Beligamo ===
Province of Beligamo
Portuguese Name	Current Name	Coordinates
Achelu	Achchelu	9.7412, 80.07081
Achivelly	Achchuveli	9.77403, 80.11854
Alavethy	Alaveddy	9.76976, 80.00708
Anacothe	Anaicoddai	9.70351, 79.99965
Arialle	Ariyalai	9.63545, 80.08382
Arralle	Araly	9.7065, 79.95403
Atalpatu	(?)	(?)
Avarangal	Avarangal	9.76056, 80.11436
Bathucothe	Vaddukoddai	9.73715, 79.95027
Candaracudde	Kadurugoda	9.74674, 80.00798
Cangancture	Kankesanturai	9.8154, 80.04452
Cathuvan	Kadduvan	9.77871, 80.04698
Chamdelipay	Sandilipay	9.74933, 79.98738
Chamguvery	(?)	(?)
Changany	Chankanai	9.74529, 79.97247
Chilalle	Sillalai	9.77844, 79.96123
Choliverão or Churivelão	Chulipuram	9.76592, 79.94623
Chudumale	Suthumalai	9.72041, 80.00617
Chumduculy	Chundikuli	9.65649, 80.02871
Chunagão	Chunnakam	9.7482, 80.02694
Churavathe or Churavatho	Soorawathai	9.75165, 80.03822
Churupithy or Ghurupithy	Siruppiddy	9.73095, 80.09956
Columbogama	Columbuturai	9.65419, 80.04406
Comdavil	Kondavil	9.703, 80.03393
Copay	Kopay	9.70415, 80.06649
Coquvil	Kokkuvil	9.69082, 80.02114
Elalle	Earlalai	9.76387, 80.0451
Inuvil	Inuvil	9.72162, 80.02485
Irvalle	Ilavalai	9.79527, 79.9892
Madagal	Mathagal	9.78585, 79.96623
Magueapethy	(?)	(?)
Maillithy	Myliddy	9.81114, 80.06805
Malagão	Mallakam	9.76188, 80.02414
Malpatu	(?)	(?)
Manipay	Manipay	9.7291, 79.99254
Mavethypurão	Maviddapuram	9.80076, 80.03532
Mulay	Moolai	9.74406, 79.93326
Nalur	Nallur	9.6745, 80.02946
Navally	Navaly	9.71088, 79.98713
Navaquery	Nawatkiri	9.7576, 80.09478
Nirvely	Neervely	9.72655, 80.08702
Nirvelly Cuilcuddy	(?)	(?)
Paduvaycaret	(?)	(?)
Palalle	Palali	9.79823, 80.0898
Pale	Pallai	9.80072, 80.04304
Pandatheripo	Pandatharippu	9.77297, 79.97323
Patanão	Jaffna	9.66344, 80.0161
Parcuanapetitevature or Peracunapetitevacune	(?)	(?)
Periablan	Periyavillan	9.78426, 79.9892
Punalle Cathuvan	Punnalaikkadduvan	9.76041, 80.06528
Puthur	Puttur	9.74505, 80.10606
Tagithy	Thaiyiddy	9.80227, 80.05131
Tavaddy	Thavady	9.70743, 80.01459
Telipule	Tellippalai	9.78229, 80.03257
Tirinelvelly	Thirunelvely	9.68257, 80.03699
Tolverão	Tholpuram	9.75436, 79.94457
Tueny	Thunavy	9.72874, 79.96627
Udduvil	Uduvil	9.73406, 80.01056
Urelu	Urelu	9.73935, 80.05257
Urumpiray	Urumpirai	9.72232, 80.04651
Vannarpone	Vannarpannai	9.689, 80.0083
Varatalablan	Varuthalaivilan	9.78845, 80.04997
Vayablan	Vayavilan	9.7756, 80.07679
Vimaogamao	Veemankamam	9.7896, 80.03541
Virimani Catuvãoture	Viramanikkatevanturai	9.81484, 80.04954

=== Province of Baddamarache ===
Province of Baddamarache
Portuguese Name	Current Name	Coordinates
Alvay	Alvai	9.82065, 80.20789
Caravethy	Karaveddi	9.79922, 80.18926
Carnavay	Karanavai	9.79161, 80.18323
Cathauelly	Kaddaively	9.78772, 80.2095
Mailvalacore	Mayiliyathanai	9.82509, 80.14835
Ocuruchy	(?)	(?)
Parituture	Point Pedro	9.8247, 80.23667
Pulolle	Puloly	9.81101, 80.23936
Tondamannar	Thondaimanaru	9.8184, 80.13696
Tumbale Varatapule	Thumpalai + Varaathupalai	9.82139, 80.24876 + 9.80664, 80.23871
Tunalle	Thunnalai	9.78831, 80.21966
Udupithy	Udupiddy	9.80795, 80.15769
Valiverao	Vallipuram	9.79025, 80.24189
Valvetiture	Valvettithurai	9.82621, 80.18015

=== Province of Temerache ===
Province of Temerache
Portuguese Name	Current Name	Coordinates
Alalle	Allarai	9.6657, 80.19508
Cachay	Kachchai	9.65114, 80.20754
Caidaddy	Kaithady	9.67998, 80.10029
Chagavacheyra	Chavakachcheri	9.66028, 80.16127
Chereyalle	Sarasalai	9.70206, 80.17286
Coilacandy	Koyilakkandi	9.64992, 80.10982
Cuddamien	Kudamiyan	9.69417, 80.23565
Cuddatani	Kudathanai	9.7535, 80.25722
Cuddigamão	Kodikamam	9.68639, 80.22201
Huyen	Usan	9.66401, 80.24332
Illidematual	Eluthumaduwal	9.66484, 80.26562
Manduvil	Madduvil	9.69257, 80.15083
Mathuvil	Manthuvil	9.69487, 80.19445
Mirzivil	Mirusuvil	9.67684, 80.24478
Mizalle	Meesalai	9.67876, 80.18922
Palavy	Palavi	9.64457, 80.2117
Pocathy	Potpathi	9.7568, 80.28271
Quipelly	Ketpeli	9.64747, 80.22344
Tenanquelepo	Thanankilappu	9.6298, 80.14954
Varany	Varani	9.74089, 80.22857
Vedditapato	Vidaththalpalai	9.63951, 80.24954
Yettale	Iyattalai	9.71862, 80.21308

=== Province of Pachelapaly ===
Province of Pachelapaly
Portuguese Name	Current Name	Coordinates
Aliavale or Alivale	Aliyawalai	9.58867, 80.44639
Bembodduqueny	Vempodukerny	9.62189, 80.30262
Callaly	Kilaly	9.6197, 80.26651
Catandarpuldo or Cotandarculam	Koddandarkulam	9.57399, 80.41794
Chamgatarvael	Sangatharvayal	9.55085, 80.41789
Chembiapathu	Chempiyanpattu	9.65027, 80.37006
Chorampathu or Chirapatu	Soranpattu	9.58821, 80.36924
Coilvael	Kovilvayal	9.55705, 80.41319
Iacachy	Iyakkachchi	9.56603, 80.40024
Itavil	Ittavil	9.63463, 80.31256
Majarmatycota	Masar	9.59843, 80.38578
Malvil	Malvil	9.57777, 80.39468
Marudenqueny	Maruthankarny	9.62003, 80.40184
Mugavil	Muhavil	9.59127, 80.40127
Mugomalle	Muhamalai	9.63811, 80.29564
Mulian	Mulliyan	9.55249, 80.47104
Periapachelapaly	Periyapachchilaippali	9.56766, 80.44847
Periapale or Penapale	Periyapallai	9.6139, 80.33476
Pocarapu	Pokaruppu	9.53102, 80.50563
Pulopale	Pulopallai	9.59123, 80.32703
Quideropu	Kudarappu	9.67294, 80.34431
Tambagama	Thampakamam	9.6248, 80.33802
Tanmaqueny or Taniaqueni	Tharmakerny	9.58261, 80.34083
Triviculão	(?)	(?)
Udduture	Uduthurai	9.60437, 80.42655
Vananqueny	Vannankeni	9.60635, 80.34135
Vataraen	Vaththirayan	9.61378, 80.41517
Vivandienpathu	(?)	(?)

=== Ilhas (Islands) ===
Ilhas (Islands)
Portuguese Name	Current Name	Coordinates
Alipiti	Allaipiddy	9.62334, 79.96767
Charavana	Saravanai	9.66536, 79.89501
Ilha Analativu	Analaitivu (Island)	9.6679, 79.77643
Ilha Cardiva	Karaitivu (Island)	9.7342, 79.87418
Ilha das Vacas	Neduntivu or Delft (Island)	9.51414, 79.68388
Ilha Deserta	Eluvaitivu (Island)	9.69227, 79.81087
Ilha do Cais or Cais dos Elefantes or Tanadiva	Velanai or Kayts (Island)	9.65085, 79.90786
Ilha dos Bramanes	Nainativu (Island)	9.60712, 79.76522
Ilha Duas Irmãs	Iranativu (Island)	9.28993, 79.98361
Ilha Mandadiva	Mandaitivu (Island)	9.61615, 79.99266
Ilha Pomgartivu or Pungudiro	Punkudutivu (Island)	9.58964, 79.82407
Valana	Velanai	9.63777, 79.90177

== Manar - Mannar ==
Mannar Island was conquered by the Portuguese in 1560. The lands on the main island of Sri Lanka, immediately across the channel from Mannar Island, collectively named Mantota, also came to be under the direct sovereignty of the Portuguese.

=== Ilha de Manar (Mannar Island) ===
Manar (Mannar)
Portuguese Name	Current Name	Coordinates
Carcel	Karisal	9.06685, 79.84118
Manar	Mannar	8.97785, 79.91548
Patim	(?)	(?)
Pexale	Pesalai	9.08655, 79.8195
São Pedro	(?)	(?)
Talemanar	Talaimannar	9.09143, 79.72606

=== Mantota ===
Mantota
Portuguese Name	Current Name	Coordinates
Aripo	Arippu	8.7955, 79.92539
Carcamoripo	Karikkamurippu	8.8361, 79.95179
Chitaveli	(?)	(?)
Ellipo Coulão or Ilipo Coulão or Ilipo Colão or Lepocolão	Iluppaikulam	8.88238, 79.9995
Mantota	Manthai	8.95056, 79.96757
Menchanali	(?)	(?)
Murunguem	Murunkan	8.83692, 80.03714
Nanata	Nanattan	8.83622, 79.96923
Panicali	(?)	(?)
Parpão Candel or Parpao Cander	Parappakandal	8.88941, 80.01055
Pereangali	Vidataltivu	9.01952, 80.05272
Sidaluia	(?)	(?)

== Sete Corlas - Seven Korales (Kotte Kingdom) ==
=== Putalão - Puttalam ===
==== Cadelxutu Pato ====
Cadelxutu Pato
Portuguese Name	Current Name	Coordinates
Bora Manam Candel	(?)	(?)
Bularatacamdel	(?)	(?)
Calcandil	Kolkandu	8.06903, 79.90224
Caridambali	(?)	(?)
Cumpi Puli Camdel	(?)	(?)
Cumzicandil	(?)	(?)
Curaualli	(?)	(?)
Haticullão	(?)	(?)
Madiramcully	Madurankuli	7.90895, 79.82296
Mandeamcandel	(?)	(?)
Mangullão	(?)	(?)
Morreacullão	Muriyakulama	8.00964, 79.9433
Pallaua Rara vr	(?)	(?)
Paquamqullão	(?)	(?)
Pereaualy	Periyavillu	8.02933, 79.85332
Periacullão	Periyakulam	7.99444, 79.84158
Peta vr	(?)	(?)
Taranicandil	(?)	(?)
Telaurque	(?)	(?)
Turamtericandel	(?)	(?)
Uraxaually	(?)	(?)
Vana vr	(?)	(?)
Vanitamada	(?)	(?)
Vatalcandil	Wattakandal	8.0993, 79.8542
Vetcandel	(?)	(?)
Vilauaraya	(?)	(?)
Xellamgue	(?)	(?)
Xellauamcandil	(?)	(?)
Xellemcandil	Sellankandal	8.04299, 79.91061
Xembaualy	Simaveli	8.06538, 79.84836
Xenauael	(?)	(?)
Xenericandel	(?)	(?)
Xerucandel	(?)	(?)

==== Panparapi Pato - Pomparippu Pattu ====
Panparapi Pato - Pomparippu Pattu
Portuguese Name	Current Name	Coordinates
Aelly	Ayli	8.26836, 79.85101
Calla Candel	Kallakandal	8.31507, 79.88756
Comgarac Valy	Kokkare Wila	8.4198, 79.98155
Cumbura	Kumburavi	8.32421, 79.86238
Ilamdanate	Illande Mote	8.35245, 79.91866
Ilamdauata	Illandawattan	8.31118, 79.89756
Marcambaly	Marukkanvell	8.32777, 79.8679
Muhcandel	Mulakandavell	8.28801, 79.85697
Olugucamdel	(?)	(?)
Otucullão	Ottupallama	8.22184, 79.9822
Palle Candel	Pallakandal	8.34235, 79.8962
Ponparape	Pomparippu	8.34551, 79.88831
Rampal	Ralmadu	8.27196, 79.89642
Uaualhore	Wowala	8.30343, 79.93831
Vanaallecaua	(?)	(?)
Xerualj	(?)	(?)

The village "Xerualj" was owned by Raja Vanniya, a Vanni chief.

==== Perualichito Pato ====
Perualichito Pato
Portuguese Name	Current Name	Coordinates
Caliaamdi vr	Kohilandigama	7.95027, 80.00944
Caliamdalua	(?)	(?)
Caria vr	(?)	(?)
Costapaca vr	(?)	(?)
Nainamadur	(?)	(?)
Nali vr	Neliwewa	7.99287, 80.01105
Poravichiculão	(?)	(?)
Tagaracullão	Tamara Kulam	7.99593, 79.91168
Tarazepadi	Taraspodiya	7.97105, 80.04402
Vairacullão	(?)	(?)
Vanamcamdel	(?)	(?)
Varrate	Wadaththa	7.90275, 79.9398
Vilamcullão	(?)	(?)
Xembagapareandava vr	(?)	(?)
Xembucatari	(?)	(?)
Xomga vr	(?)	(?)

==== Padietcuar Pato ====
Padietcuar Pato
Portuguese Name	Current Name	Coordinates
Achari	Pahala Acharigama	7.8674, 79.99414
Ambatamdallue	(?)	(?)
Andiur	Andigama	7.77636, 79.94914
Cavahemcullão	Kawayankulama	7.86206, 79.91294
Lauanatena vr	(?)	(?)
Madauaqulão	Madawakkulama	7.74109, 79.98954
Maili vr	Mayilewa	7.80308, 79.92029
Mangullão	Mankulama	7.8038, 79.9426
Mani vr	Mannigama	7.83976, 79.97662
Punaquamdalue	(?)	(?)
Punavatty	Punavitiya	7.79809, 79.93018
Tetta	Thattawa	7.87636, 79.99485
Uparate	Uppalawatta	7.84089, 79.99214
Utamdalua	(?)	(?)
Varaquamacullão	(?)	(?)
Vilamqullão	(?)	(?)
Xembuqullão	Sembukuliya	7.86904, 79.91309
Xonagam Qattacada	(?)	(?)

==== Velaxe Pato ====
Velaxe Pato
Portuguese Name	Current Name	Coordinates
Arachemqullão	(?)	(?)
Aticullão	(?)	(?)
Carapumadua	Karukkumaduwa	7.86416, 79.87283
Carimata vr	(?)	(?)
Curacandel	(?)	(?)
Gadehervella	(?)	(?)
Jraiquinaly	(?)	(?)
Muneacamdel	(?)	(?)
Pugamdalue	(?)	(?)
Putamcullão	Pothu Kulam	7.86657, 79.83349
Razacatacara	(?)	(?)
Valaxe	Welasiya	7.89798, 79.86917
Vapacullão	(?)	(?)
Xelanbauatana	(?)	(?)
Xogamcandel	(?)	(?)

=== Urupala Corla - Udapola Korale ===
==== Requava Menda Pattu ====
Requava Menda Pattu
Portuguese Name	Current Name	Coordinates
Acaramulaguedra	Akurumullegedara	7.46062, 80.3112
Ahugora	Ahugoda	7.43198, 80.3125
Algama	Algama	7.41986, 80.28525
Amanugama	Amunugama	7.42992, 80.32998
Ambagahadalua	(?)	(?)
Ambahella	Ambahera	7.44647, 80.29645
Amdrumailla	(?)	(?)
Bambaragahapellassa	Bamaragahapelessa	7.44105, 80.32689
Barahaldora	Badaheddara	7.44676, 80.32854
Bulupetia	Bulupitiya	7.45781, 80.28542
Caduruella	Kaduruwela	7.41694, 80.27297
Cadurugama Mandita	Kadurugahamadiththa	7.45146, 80.32431
Calumdaguedra	Kalungedara	7.42149, 80.29061
Cannepalla	Kannehepola	7.48212, 80.30529
Cannumalleguedra	Kanumale	7.45894, 80.32409
Carimgallaguedra	Carimgallaguedra	7.43765, 80.31717
Cohoanna	Kohana	7.48709, 80.31148
Cohomdapalle	(?)	(?)
Dalupataguedra	Dalupotegedara	7.46748, 80.31631
Damgola	Dangolla	7.48929, 80.31182
Damhella	Danwella	7.46489, 80.31588
Enepalla	Henepola	7.46098, 80.30647
Galbaragama	Galabadagama	7.44758, 80.28671
Gamgoraguedra	Koongahagedera	7.42391, 80.34132
Gannegora	(?)	(?)
Garacumbura	Gorokgahakubure	7.44013, 80.2837
Goravita	Godawita	7.44646, 80.3165
Guepallaua	Gepallawa	7.46979, 80.32023
Guiméria	Ginneriya	7.40489, 80.26347
Heuemdennia	Sewendana	7.41498, 80.25571
Huhumia	Uhumiya	7.46344, 80.29687
Legaraua	(?)	(?)
Macullolua	Makuloluwa	7.42249, 80.26844
Manugola	(?)	(?)
Mayle	Maiyalla	7.43343, 80.29943
Mendegamaguedra	Medagamagedara	7.42654, 80.29401
Nagany	Nagane	7.42306, 80.27123
Netipalla	Neththipola	7.43078, 80.28965
Pallealgama	Pattiyagama	7.42746, 80.28236
Palle Yatienna	(?)	(?)
Pambeguedra	Pambe	7.47559, 80.29944
Pannagamua	Panagamuwa	7.43981, 80.29841
Paracumbura	Parakumbura	7.43402, 80.30722
Piduruella or Yduruuella	Piduruwella	7.45682, 80.30696
Requava	Rekawa	7.44412, 80.3081
Tamita	Thammita	7.44212, 80.29102
Urugamua	Udugama	7.4326, 80.27437
Vehera	Wahera	7.41005, 80.25972
Veualpalla	Wewalpola	7.45682, 80.30696
Ylugora	Ilukgoda	7.4277, 80.25586

==== Ottota Pattu ====
Ottota Pattu
Portuguese Name	Current Name	Coordinates

=== Madure Corla - Madure Korale ===
Madure Corla - Madure Korale
Portuguese Name	Current Name	Coordinates
Bauerua	Baoruwa	7.48509, 80.50711
Cosgolla	Kosgolla	7.45724, 80.52864
Cotaguedra	Kotagedara	7.4465, 80.53407
Deluita	Delvita	7.50362, 80.54651
Imguriuata	Ikiriwatta	7.42249, 80.53082
Malbe	Malbe	7.47391, 80.51398
Malmiualla	Malmeewala	7.49464, 80.54557
Mianadenia	Miyanadeniya	7.44492, 80.51135
Nalla	Nahalla	7.51941, 80.50965
Niangama	Niyangama	7.42737, 80.53934
Olharapalle	Ogodapola	7.47594, 80.51196
Ollagama	Olagama	7.50998, 80.50344
Padenia	Paldeniya	7.47377, 80.52646
Panagama	Panagama	7.50361, 80.52846
Panagamua	Panagamuwa	7.48854, 80.51421
Paragora	Paragoda	7.42759, 80.52205
Pihimbua	Pihimbuwa	7.45584, 80.51237
Rambadagalla or Ramballagalla	Rambadagalla	7.50661, 80.50927
Readagora	Reddagoda	7.535, 80.52167
Vallagamua	Walagama	7.44013, 80.51161
Veagama	Wegama	7.44896, 80.53167

== Dissava de Sofragão (Sabaragamuwa Dissavany) ==
=== Panaual Corla (Panawal Korale) ===
Panaual Corla - Panawal Korale
Portuguese Name	Current Name	Coordinates
Asgamgula	Asgangula	6.85329, 80.27186
Asnapitia	Hathnapitiya	6.85652, 80.32005
Atanagualla	Hathnagala	6.89684, 80.2783
Batamgualla	Batangala	6.91258, 80.27464
Benadallua	Bendaluwa	6.82285, 80.29968
Dedeuallam	(?)	(?)
Diguaua	Digowa	6.88157, 80.32591
Dompeguedra	(?)	(?)
Eialiagora	Eheliyagoda	6.85772, 80.26281
Jbulpitia	Imbulpitiya	6.86822, 80.33878
Jogama Cottapalle	Yogama	6.91738, 80.26121
Lacmana	Lakmana	6.90387, 80.25762
Mahara	Mahara	6.84476, 80.2766
Maharaua	(?)	(?)
Maniamgama	Maniyangama	6.94411, 80.23204
Meneripetia	Meneripitiya	6.81726, 80.32094
Panaualla	Panawala	6.88908, 80.27292
Patberia	Pathberiya	6.84046, 80.31239
Pucnauella	Pukunawala	6.89628, 80.2852
Quetimigama	(?)	(?)
Tallapetia	Thalapitiya	6.87804, 80.29364
Ulangasdalua	(?)	(?)

=== Coruite Corlla or Curuity Corlla (Kuruwita Korale) ===
==== Palle Patu or Pale Patu ====
Palle Patu or Pale Patu
Portuguese Name	Current Name	Coordinates

==== Ura Patu ====
Ura Patu
Portuguese Name	Current Name	Coordinates

=== Terras de Guillimalle Bambarabato ===
Terras de Guillimalle Bambarabato
Portuguese Name	Current Name	Coordinates
Bambarabato	Bambarabotuwa	6.70898, 80.54186
Guillimalle	Gileemale	6.74906, 80.42904

=== Menda Corlla (Meda Korale) ===
Menda Corlla - Meda Korale
Portuguese Name	Current Name	Coordinates
Atelia or Atella	Hatalla	6.58255, 80.62997
Batamdure	Batadura	6.56336, 80.64329
Opaniaque or Ôpanayque	Opanayake	6.60882, 80.62183
Quirana or Quiramba	Kiramba	6.59249, 80.61876

== Dissava de Maturé (Matara Dissavany) ==
=== Salpiti Corlla (Salpiti Korale) ===
Salpiti Corlla - Salpiti Korale
Portuguese Name	Current Name	Coordinates
Adigama	Hedigama	6.79271, 79.91651
Agarama	Sangharama	6.81076, 79.95549
Alpita	Halpita	6.78263, 79.95908
Arauualla	Erewwala	6.82763, 79.93607
Atiddia	Attidiya	6.83257, 79.88581
Bamdarabague	(?)	(?)
Batagatara	Batakettara	6.78294, 79.92251
Batuuamdora	Batuwandara	6.77051, 79.94771
Berataualla	Berawawala	6.7794, 79.93295
Bogumdara	Bokundara	6.81803, 79.92021
Borlasmigamua	Boralesgamuwa	6.83934, 79.90264
Cadagama	(?)	(?)
Caliam Mahara	Kaliyammahara	6.82007, 79.92692
Catuuaualla	Katuwawala	6.82833, 79.91195
Caurana	Kawdana	6.84745, 79.86765
Colamuna	Kolamunna	6.79414, 79.92375
Condruaua	Kondurawa	6.79161, 79.9515
Curamahadua	Kudamaduwa	6.8009, 79.9586
Deltota	Delthara	6.7858, 79.91063
Demaladua	Demaladuwa	6.78768, 79.93768
Deyballa	Dehiwala	6.85343, 79.86382
Diagama	Diyagama	6.80292, 79.9959
Gamburalia	Jumburaliya	6.76002, 79.94568
Gamgudauilla	Gangodawila	6.86325, 79.89994
Gamgulla	(?)	(?)
Geligore	(?)	(?)
Goracapitia	Gorakapitiya	6.81437, 79.94864
Guadigamua	Godigamuwa	6.83778, 79.9302
Hãopamanua	Nampamunuwa	6.8124, 79.9468
Homnamdora	Honnanthara	6.80153, 79.94925
Horatudua	Horathuduwa	6.79074, 79.95959
Hurahamulla	Udahamulla	6.86404, 79.91082
Lamballagora	Siyambalagoda	6.79228, 79.96683
Lamura	(?)	(?)
Latiana	(?)	(?)
Macamdana	Makandana	6.7741, 79.93927
Maculdua	Makuludoowa	6.81369, 79.93653
Magamana	Magammana	6.82168, 79.99813
Maharagama	Maharagama	6.84753, 79.92737
Mahetara	Mavittara	6.80362, 79.94025
Malluaraua	Mahalwarawa	6.83925, 79.95635
Mampee	Mampe	6.79801, 79.92758
Matagora	Mattegoda	6.81419, 79.97157
Matamiti	(?)	(?)
Mepita Amballãogora	Ambalangoda	6.77913, 79.96823
Miriana	Mirihana	6.87749, 79.906
Morada	Morenda	6.77232, 79.95289
Moroto	(?)	(?)
Morotua	Moratuwa	6.77538, 79.88334
Nauina	Navinna	6.85333, 79.91507
Nillammahara	Neelammahara	6.82856, 79.92059
Nimugama	Niungama	6.77807, 79.95072
Niuantidia	Niwanthidiya	6.8247, 79.92734
Pallagama	Palagama	6.76416, 79.97042
Pallecaturua	Kahathuduwa	6.7828, 79.98947
Palluamballãogora	Paluambalangoda	6.77264, 79.96291
Pamanua	Pamunuwa	6.8513, 79.92865
Panalla Pagora	Pagoda	6.8774, 79.89587
Panaua	Depanama	6.85939, 79.94434
Panipitia	Pannipitiya	6.84714, 79.9481
Pelamuata	Pelenwatta	6.82486, 79.95153
Pitiualgama	(?)	(?)
Poluata	Polwatta	6.86183, 79.93895
Quallibouila	Kalubouila	6.86646, 79.87785
Quidigama Pamanua	Kirigampamunuwa	6.79692, 79.98232
Quillapatu	(?)	(?)
Quiriuaturua	Kiriwattuduwa	6.80154, 80.00474
Ratmalana	Rathmalana	6.81954, 79.88008
Rilaualla	Rilawala	6.78891, 79.97895
Tumbouila	Thumbowila	6.81459, 79.91376
Uellauata	Wellawatte	6.87216, 79.8609
Uetera	Wethara	6.78593, 79.97296
Ueuilla	Wewala	6.8037, 79.9104
Ugaldampee	Dampe	6.7701, 79.91647
Umdatugra	Undurugoda	6.7815, 79.97639
