= List of islands of Sri Lanka =

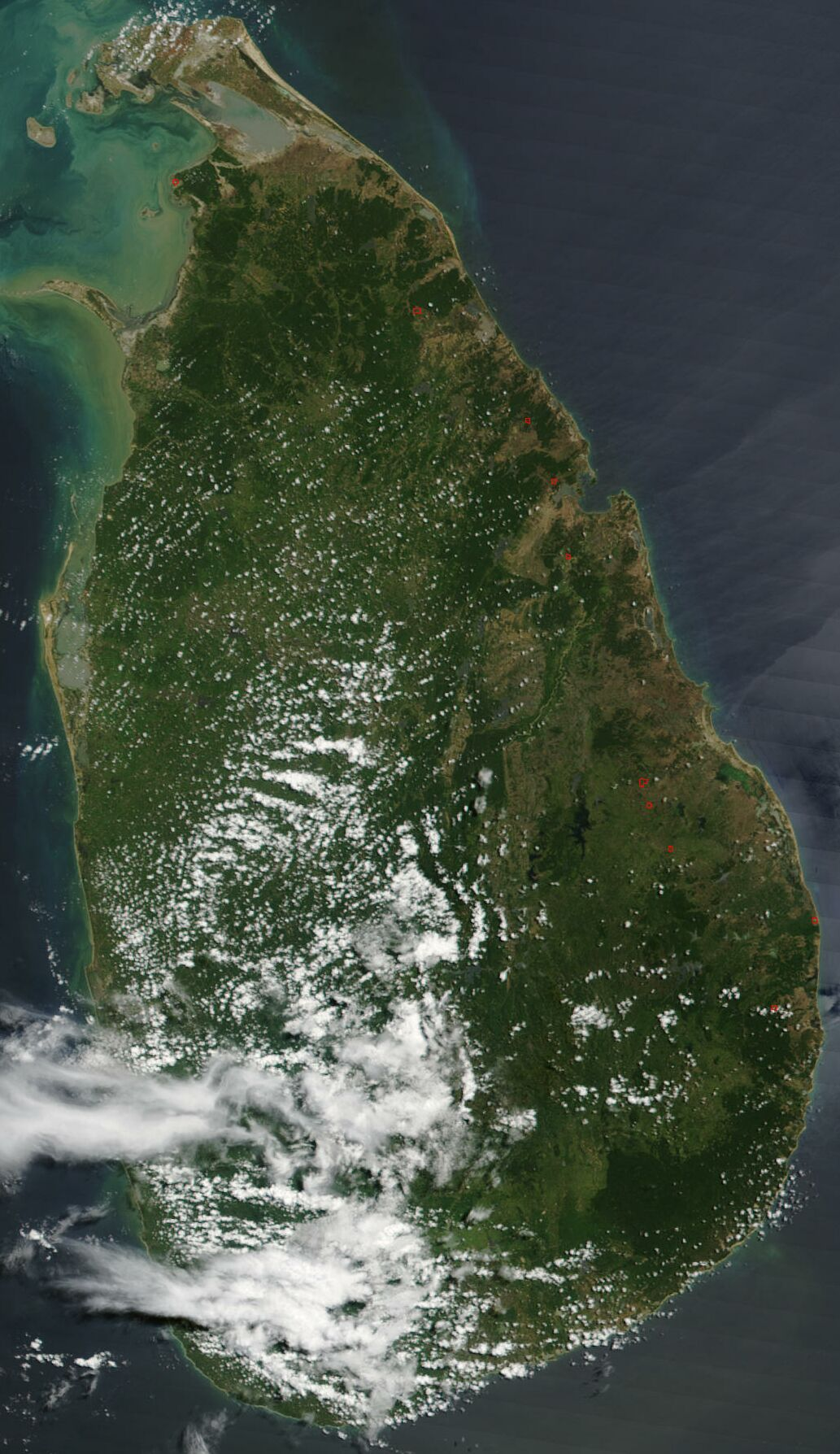
Sri Lanka

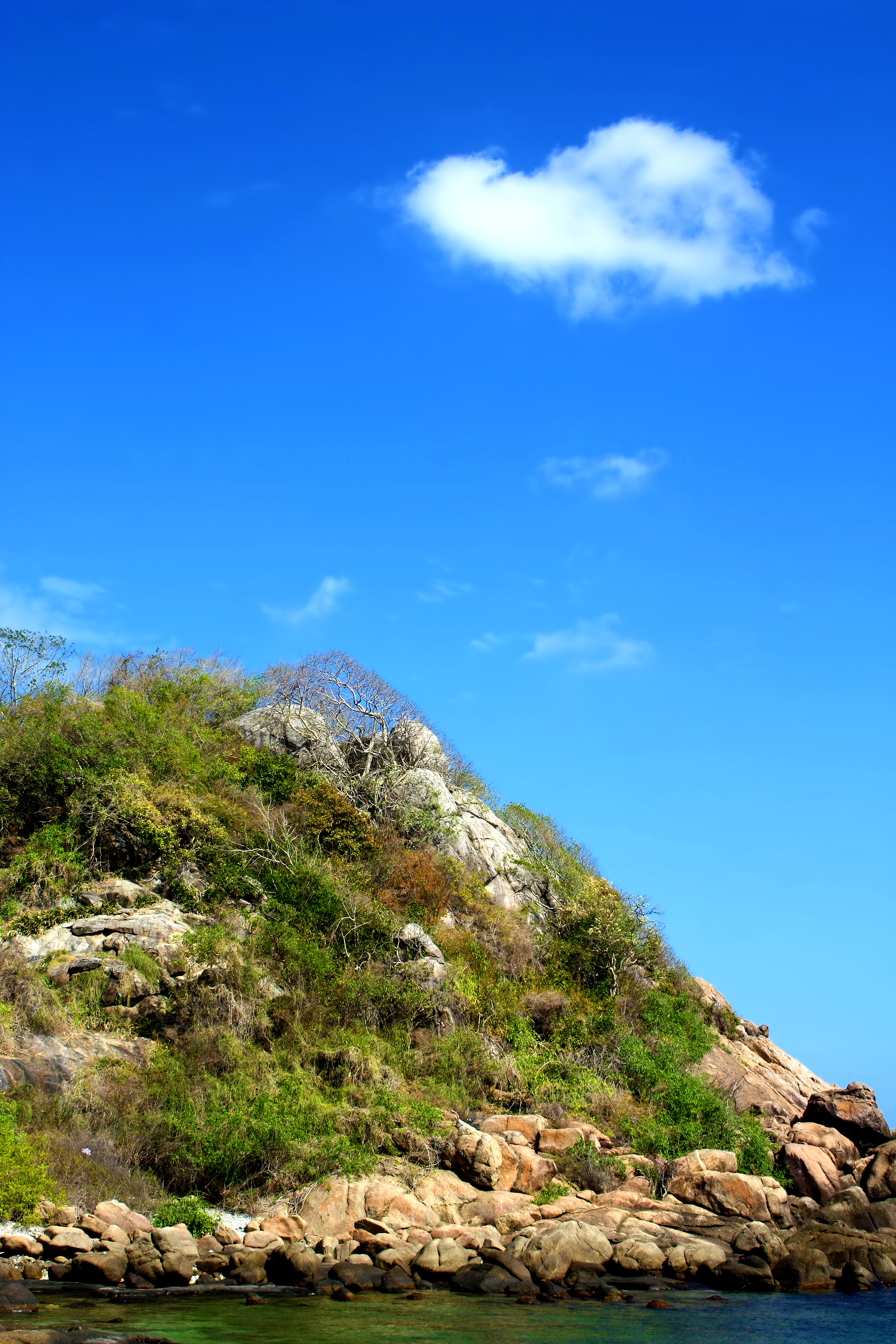
Pigeon Island

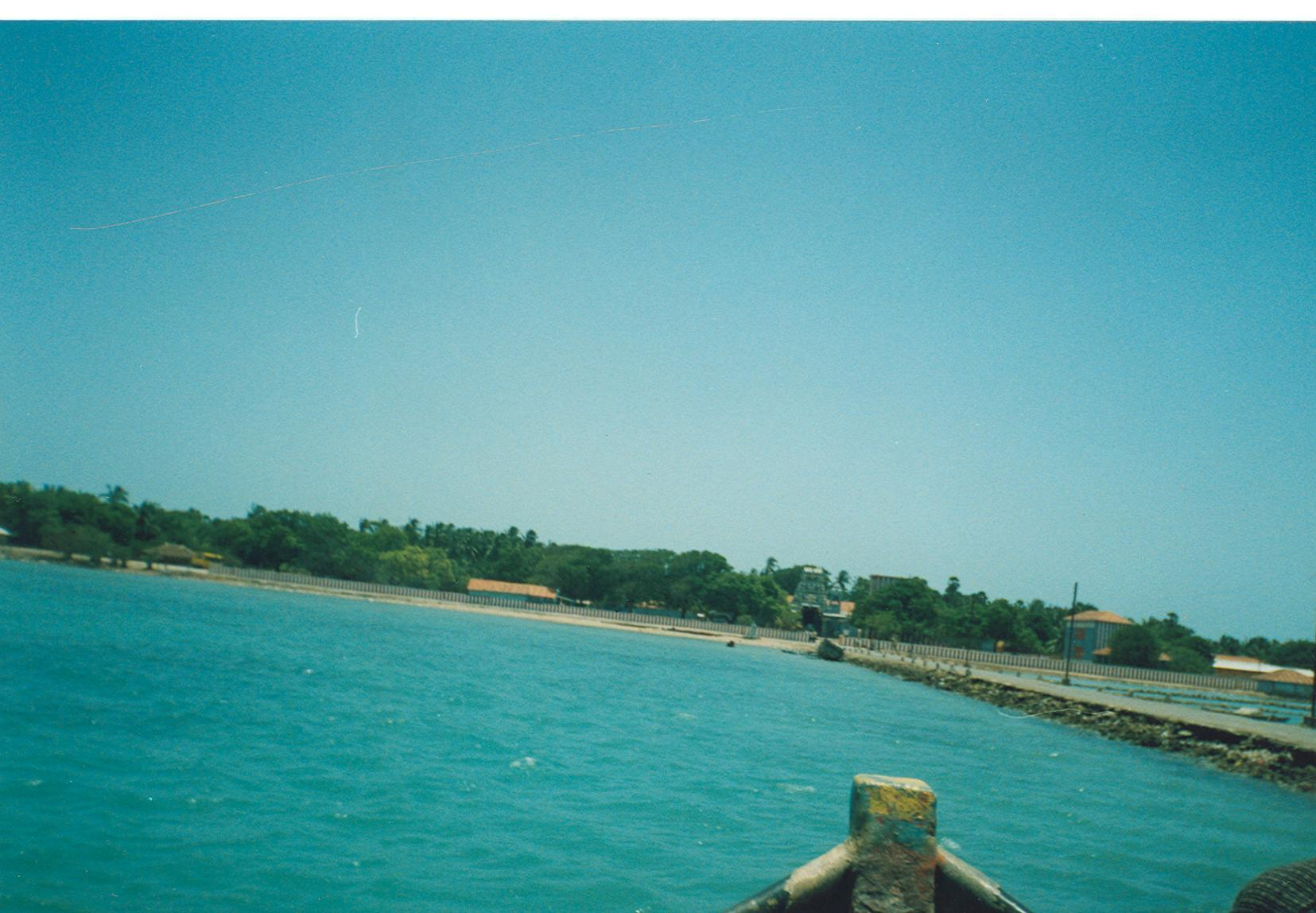
Nainativu

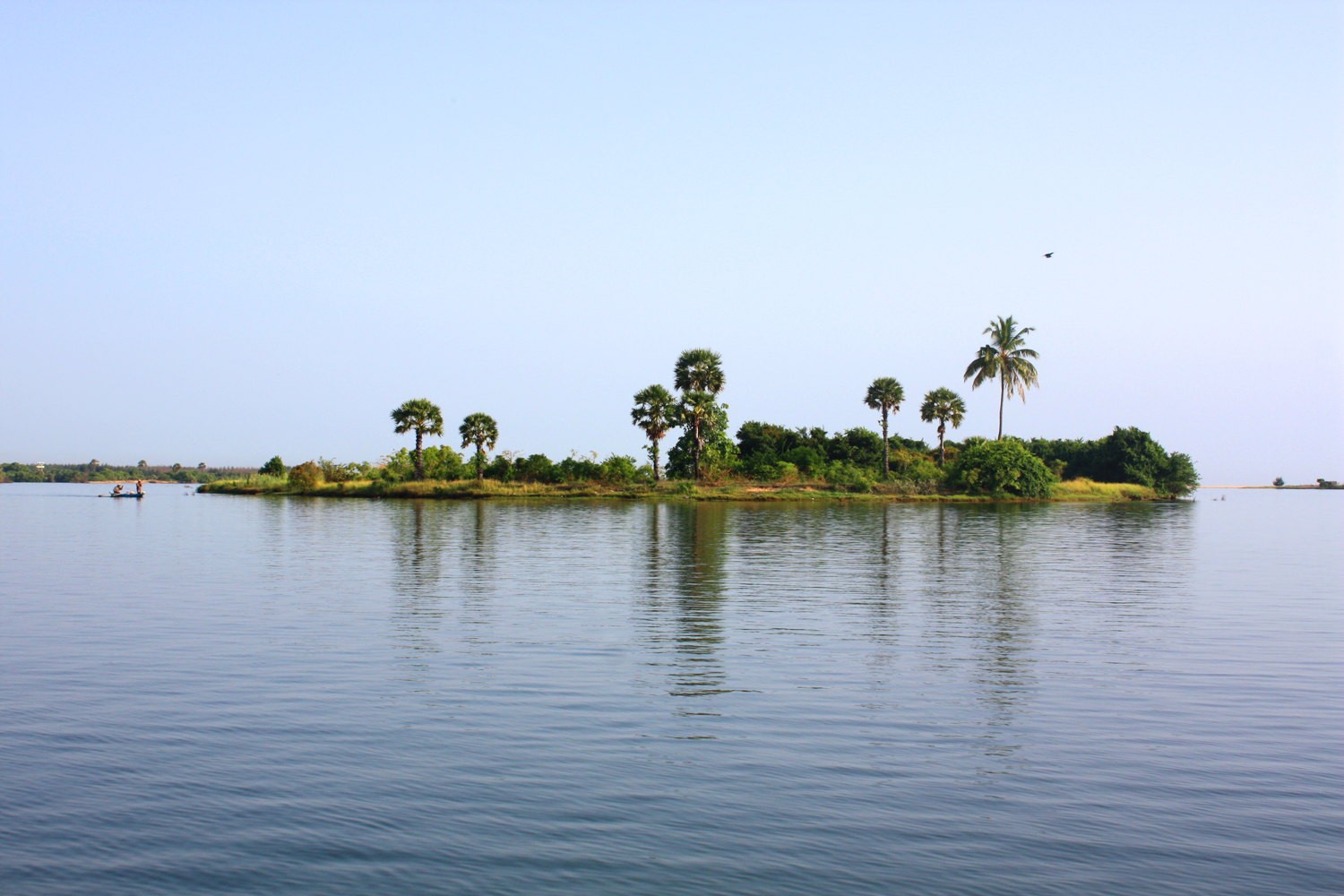
Bone Island, Batticaloa

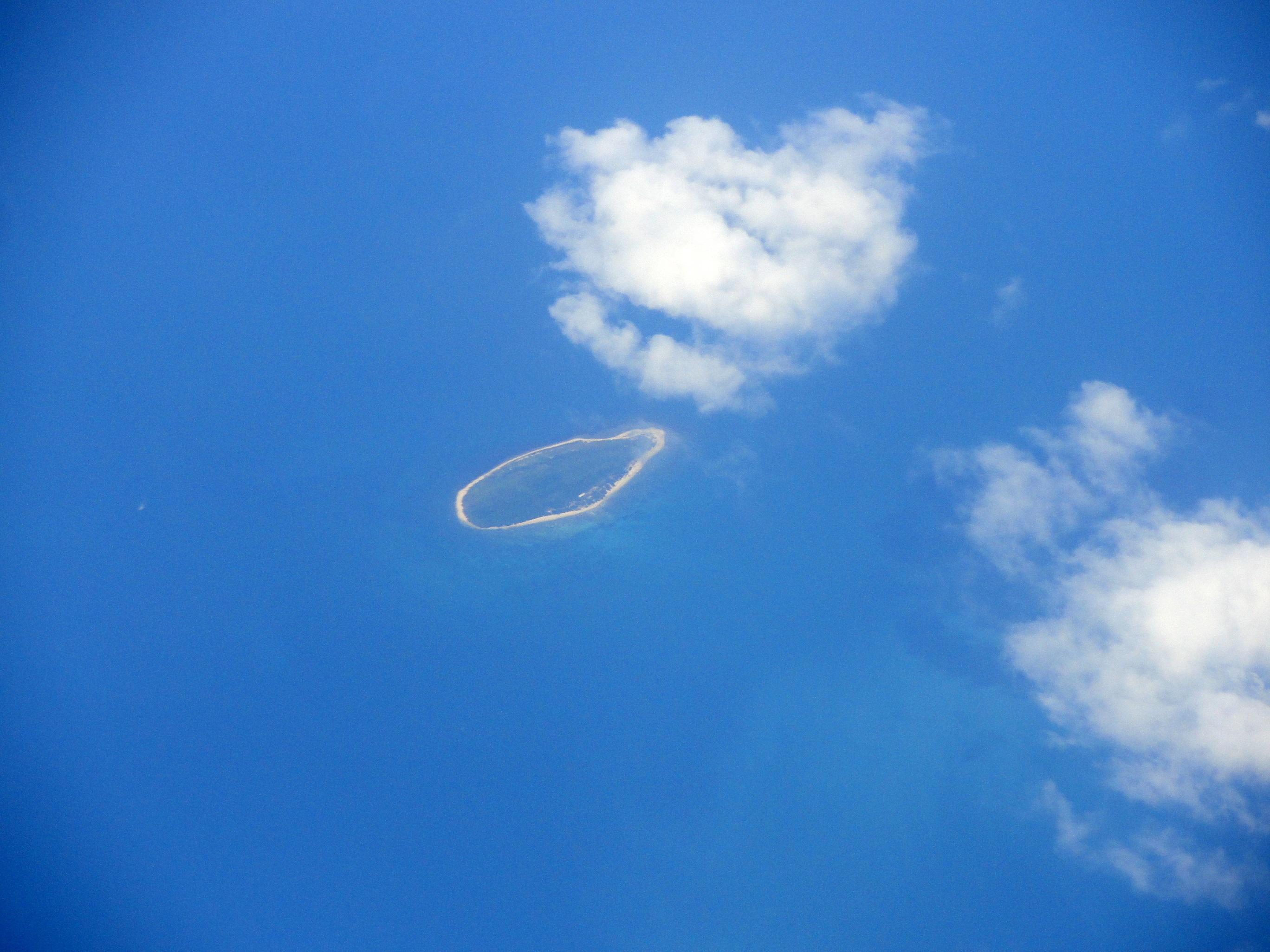
Kakaraitivu Island

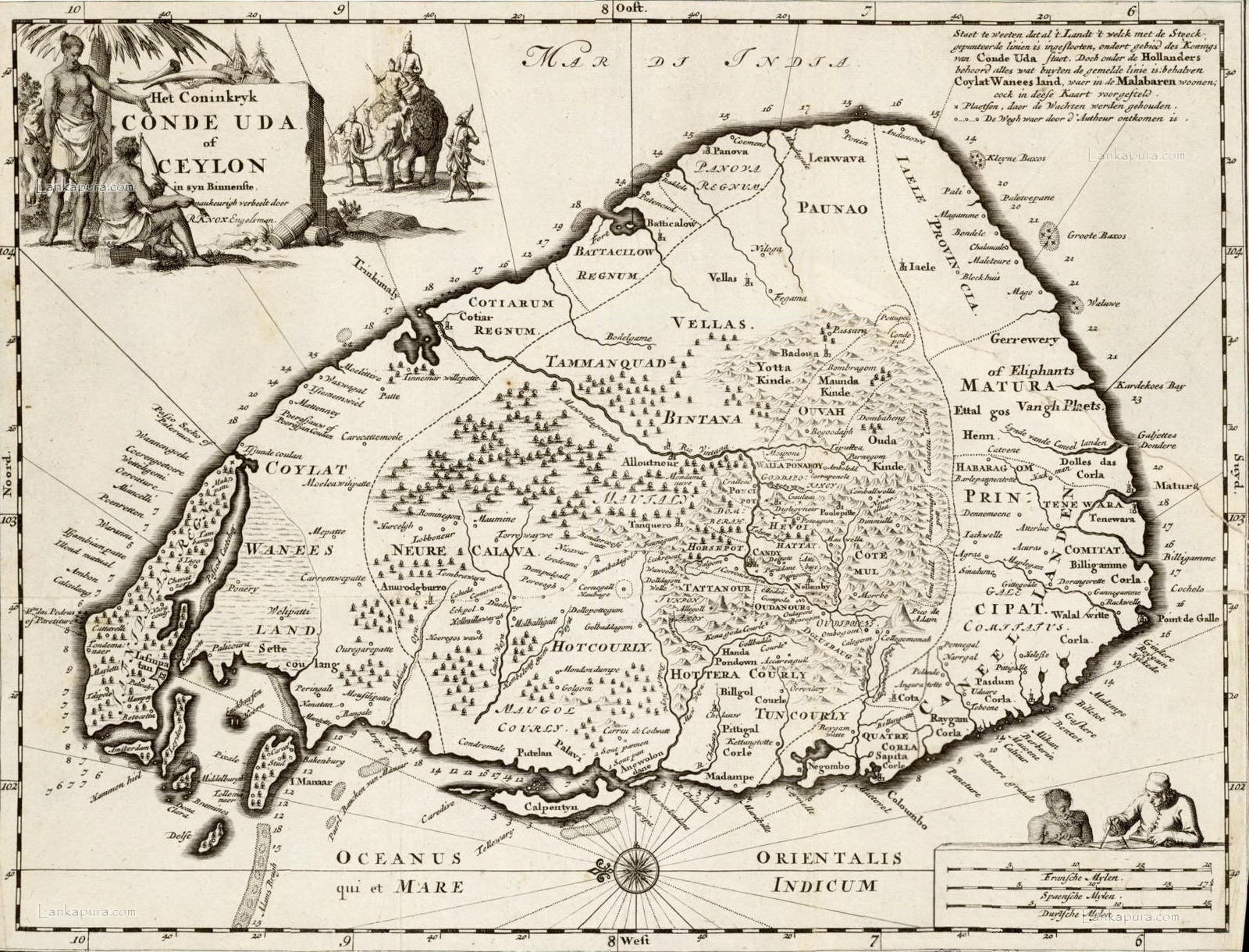
17th century Dutch map of Sri Lanka with the Dutch names of the Jaffna islands

Sri Lanka is an island country in the Indian Ocean. There are also a number of smaller islands around Sri Lanka, most abundantly in the north and eastern parts of the islands. The most prominent islets are west of the Jaffna Peninsula in the Northern Province. Many of these islands were given Dutch names during the Dutch colonial period, only a few of these names are still in use today.

Sri Lanka has a total area of 65,610 km^{2}, with 64,740 km^{2} of land and 870 km^{2} of water, and a coastline that is 1,340 km long. The main island of Sri Lanka has an area of 65,268 km^{2} and is the 25th largest island in the world by area. Dozens of offshore islands account for the remaining 342 km^{2} of area.

== List of islands ==
Island	Province	District	Divisional Secretariat	Coordinates	Area (km^{2})	Population (approx)	Notes
Sri Lanka	—N/a	—N/a	—N/a	7°N 81°E	65,268	22,157,000	Main island. Tamil: Ilankai
Ambanttativu	North Western	Puttalam		8°12′40″N 79°46′06″E	0.17		In Puttalam Lagoon; Sinhala: Sambanda-doowa.
Analaitivu	Northern	Jaffna	Islands North (Kayts)	9°40′01″N 79°46′32″E	4.82	2,200	Dutch: Rotterdam, Annelletivo; Sinhala: Annaladoowa.
Bone Island	Eastern	Batticaloa	Manmunai North	7°45′12″N 81°41′24″E	0.02		In Batticaloa Lagoon.
Buffalo Island	Eastern	Batticaloa	Manmunai North	7°41′23″N 81°41′58″E	5.18		In Batticaloa Lagoon.
Challitivu	Eastern	Batticaloa	Koralai Pattu North	8°06′40″N 81°27′49″E	0.09		Sinhala: Galdoowa
Chirutivu (Sirutivu)	Northern	Jaffna	Islands South (Velanai)	9°38′36″N 80°00′37″E	0.28		Between Mandativu and Jaffna Peninsula. Sinhala: Hiridoowa
Clappenburg Island	Eastern	Trincomalee	Town & Gravets	8°31′50″N 81°12′37″E	0.05		In Koddiyar Bay.
Elephant Island	Eastern	Trincomalee	Town & Gravets	8°31′59″N 81°14′00″E	0.06		In Koddiyar Bay.
Eluvaitivu	Northern	Jaffna	Islands North (Kayts)	9°42′03″N 79°48′38″E	1.40	800	Sinhala: Eluvadoowa
Erumaitivu	Northern	Kilinochchi	Poonakary	9°20′15″N 80°03′20″E	1.04		Sinhala: Mahisadoowa
Erumaitivu	North Western	Puttalam		8°16′07″N 79°46′44″E	0.90		In Dutch Bay. Sinhala: Mahisadoowa
Great Sober Island	Eastern	Trincomalee	Town & Gravets	8°32′39″N 81°12′34″E	0.62		Wildlife sanctuary in China Bay.
Henativu/Havativu	North Western	Puttalam		7°58′22″N 79°49′09″E	0.78		In channel between Puttalam Lagoon and Mundal Lagoon. Sinhala: Haavadoowa.
Ippantivu	North Western	Puttalam		8°19′49″N 79°48′22″E	0.76		In Dutch Bay. Sinhala: Ibbandoowa.
Iranaitivu North	Northern	Kilinochchi	Poonakary	9°17′31″N 79°58′54″E	4.22		Dutch: Enkhuizen. Sinhala: Erandoowa.
Iranaitivu South	Northern	Kilinochchi	Poonakary	9°16′50″N 80°00′04″E	1.71		Dutch Hoorn. Sinhala: Uoona doowa.
Kachchatheevu	Northern	Jaffna	Neduntivu (Delft)	9°23′16″N 79°31′37″E	0.68		Pali: Kachchatheetha. Sinhala: Kachchadoowa.
Kakaraitivu Island	Northern	Kilinochchi	Pallikudah	9°26′23″N 79°53′14″E	0.14	Uninhabited	Dutch: Calienye. Sinhala: Sakkaradoowa.
Kakkativu	Northern	Kilinochchi	Poonakary	9°19′01″N 80°04′51″E	1.10		Sinhala: Kaakadoowa
Kalliaditivu	Northern	Mannar		8°56′54″N 79°54′42″E	1.71		Sinhala: Galadi doowa
Kanantivu	Northern	Jaffna	Islands South (Velanai)	9°37′33″N 79°51′26″E	1.22		Between Kayts and Pungudutivu. Sinhala: Kaennadoowa.
Karaditivu	North Western	Puttalam		7°54′42″N 79°48′54″E	0.09		In channel between Puttalam Lagoon and Mundal Lagoon. Sinhala: Karadiva
Karaitivu	Northern	Jaffna	Islands South (Velanai)	9°36′27″N 79°49′48″E	0.97		Adjacent (north) of Pungudutivu.
Karaitivu	Northern	Jaffna	Karaitivu (Karainagar)	9°44′03″N 79°52′33″E	22.95	8,600	Dutch: Amsterdam.
Karaitivu	North Western	Puttalam		8°27′45″N 79°47′15″E			West of Portugal Bay.
Velanai	Northern	Jaffna	Islands North (Kayts) & Islands South (Velanai)	9°39′09″N 79°54′11″E	64.01	16,300	Named Leiden by Dutch. Sinhala: Uruthota (Kayts); Bellana (Velanai)
Kurikadduvan	Northern	Jaffna	Islands South (Velanai)	9°35′43″N 79°47′40″E	0.38		Adjacent (north west) of Naduturitti. Sinhala: Kiralakatuvana
Little Sober Island	Eastern	Trincomalee	Town & Gravets	8°32′35″N 81°12′54″E	0.07		Wildlife sanctuary in China Bay.
Mandaitivu	Northern	Jaffna	Islands South (Velanai)	9°36′48″N 79°59′44″E	7.56	900	Sinhala: Mandadoowa
Mannar	Northern	Mannar	Mannar Town	9°03′10″N 79°49′42″E	126.46		Sinhala: Mannaram doopatha
Mantivu	Eastern	Batticaloa	Manmunai North	7°42′03″N 81°39′43″E	0.38		In Batticaloa Lagoon. Sinhala: Maandoowa
Mantivu	North Western	Puttalam		7°55′57″N 79°49′12″E	0.50		In channel between Puttalam Lagoon and Mundal Lagoon. Sinhala: Maandoowa
Maripututivu	North Western	Puttalam		8°10′33″N 79°44′59″E	0.10		In Puttalam Lagoon. Sinhala: Maliputhu diva
Marthand	Eastern	Batticaloa	Koralai Pattu North	8°06′51″N 81°26′34″E	0.18		Sinhala: Malkadola.
Mattutivu	North Western	Puttalam		8°13′02″N 79°47′00″E	0.12		In Puttalam Lagoon. Sinhala: Maddu doowa
Nachuvantivu	Eastern	Batticaloa	Koralai Pattu	7°56′13″N 81°32′18″E	2.11		In Vandeloos Bay. Sinhala: Naapitadoowa.
Naduturitti	Northern	Jaffna	Islands South (Velanai)	9°35′05″N 79°47′54″E	0.88		Adjacent (south west) of Pungudutivu. Sinhala: Madduriththa
Nainativu	Northern	Jaffna	Islands South (Velanai)	9°36′15″N 79°46′04″E	4.22	2,700	Dutch: Haarlem; Sinhala: Naga Deepa.
Neduntivu	Northern	Jaffna	Neduntivu (Delft)	9°30′48″N 79°41′22″E	47.17	4,200	Dutch: Delft. Sinhala: Maedundoowa.
Neduntivu	North Western	Puttalam		8°14′06″N 79°46′45″E	0.10		In Dutch Bay. Sinhala: Maedundoowa.
Oddakarentivu	North Western	Puttalam		8°16′37″N 79°45′54″E	0.20		In Dutch Bay. Sinhala: Uddakadoowa.
Palaitivu	Northern	Jaffna	Islands South (Velanai)	9°37′22″N 79°49′10″E	0.16		Adjacent (north) of Pungudutivu.
Palaitivu	Northern	Kilinochchi	Poonakary	9°28′39″N 80°00′45″E	1.81		Named Galue by Dutch. Sinhala: Paludoowa.
Paratitivu	Northern	Jaffna	Islands North (Kayts)	9°41′06″N 79°47′32″E	0.38	Uninhabited	Between Analativu and Eluvaitivu. Sinhala: Paludoowa.
Periya Arichchal	North Western	Puttalam		8°17′59″N 79°47′45″E	0.32		In Dutch Bay. Sinhala: Maha Arakgala.
Periya Kayankerni (Periyawattava)	Eastern	Batticaloa	Koralai Pattu	7°57′20″N 81°32′20″E	1.81		In Vandeloos Bay. Sinhala: Kaayamkaenna.
Periyativu	Eastern	Batticaloa	Manmunai South West	7°38′22″N 81°43′39″E	0.13		In Batticaloa Lagoon. Sinhala: Mahadoowa.
Periyativu	North Western	Puttalam		7°56′57″N 79°48′58″E	1.10		In channel between Puttalam Lagoon and Mundal Lagoon. Sinhala: Mahadoowa.
Pigeon Island (Large & Small)	Eastern	Trincomalee	Kuchaveli	8°43′20″N 81°12′15″E	0.01	Uninhabited	One of the two marine national parks of Sri Lanka.
Puliyanthivu	Eastern	Batticaloa	Manmunai North	7°42′37″N 81°41′41″E	1.56	7,034	Batticaloa city Sinhala: Kotidoowa.
Puliyantivu	Northern	Jaffna	Islands North (Kayts)	9°38′52″N 79°46′28″E	0.44		Adjacent (south east) of Analativu. Sinhala: Kotidoowa.
Puliyantivu	Northern	Mannar		8°57′19″N 79°54′01″E	0.90		Sinhala: Kotidoowa.
Pullupiddi	North Western	Puttalam		8°11′21″N 79°46′40″E	0.11		In Puttalam Lagoon. Sinhala: Kotipitiya.
Pungudutivu	Northern	Jaffna	Islands South (Velanai)	9°35′08″N 79°50′05″E	22.56	3,600	Dutch: Middleburg. Pali/Sinhala: Punguthdeepa
Round Island	Eastern	Trincomalee	Town & Gravets?	8°30′46″N 81°13′34″E	0.04		In Koddiyar Bay.
Serayativu	Eastern	Batticaloa	Manmunai West	7°39′08″N 81°42′04″E	0.46		In Batticaloa Lagoon. Sinhala: Seradoowa
Sinna Arichchal	North Western	Puttalam		8°17′02″N 79°47′32″E	0.16		In Dutch Bay. Sinhala: Podi Arakgal.
Siriyativu	Eastern	Batticaloa	Manmunai Pattu	7°38′06″N 81°43′55″E	0.03		In Batticaloa Lagoon. Sinhala: Seruvadoowa.
Thimilathiu West	Eastern	Batticaloa		7°42′17.40″N 81°40′37.40″E			Location of SLAF Batticaloa. Sinhala: Kevuldoowa
Thorattapputti	Northern	Jaffna	Valikamam West (Chankanai)	9°44′55″N 79°54′23″E	0.14		Between Karaitivu and Jaffna Peninsula. Sinhala: Doratumukka.
Udayurputi	North Western	Puttalam		8°10′07″N 79°48′31″E	0.42		In Puttalam Lagoon. Sinhala: Udukurupoththa.

== See also ==
- List of islands
