= Mundal =

Mundal may refer to:

== Places ==
- Mundal, an alternative name of Fjærland, a village in Sogndal Municipality, at the end of the Fjærlandsfjorden, in Vestland county, Norway
- Mundal Lagoon, a lagoon in Puttalam District, western Sri Lanka

== People ==
- Else Mundal (born 1944), Norwegian philologist
- Mundal Singh, Indian freedom fighter
