= Puliyantivu =

Puliyantivu or Puliyanthivu or Puliyantheevu is the name of several islands in Sri Lanka, including:

- Puliyantivu (Batticaloa), an island in Batticaloa District
- Puliyantivu (Jaffna), an island in Jaffna District
