= Delft Island fort =

Fort in Sri Lanka

Delft Island Fort
- Neduntheevu, Sri Lanka
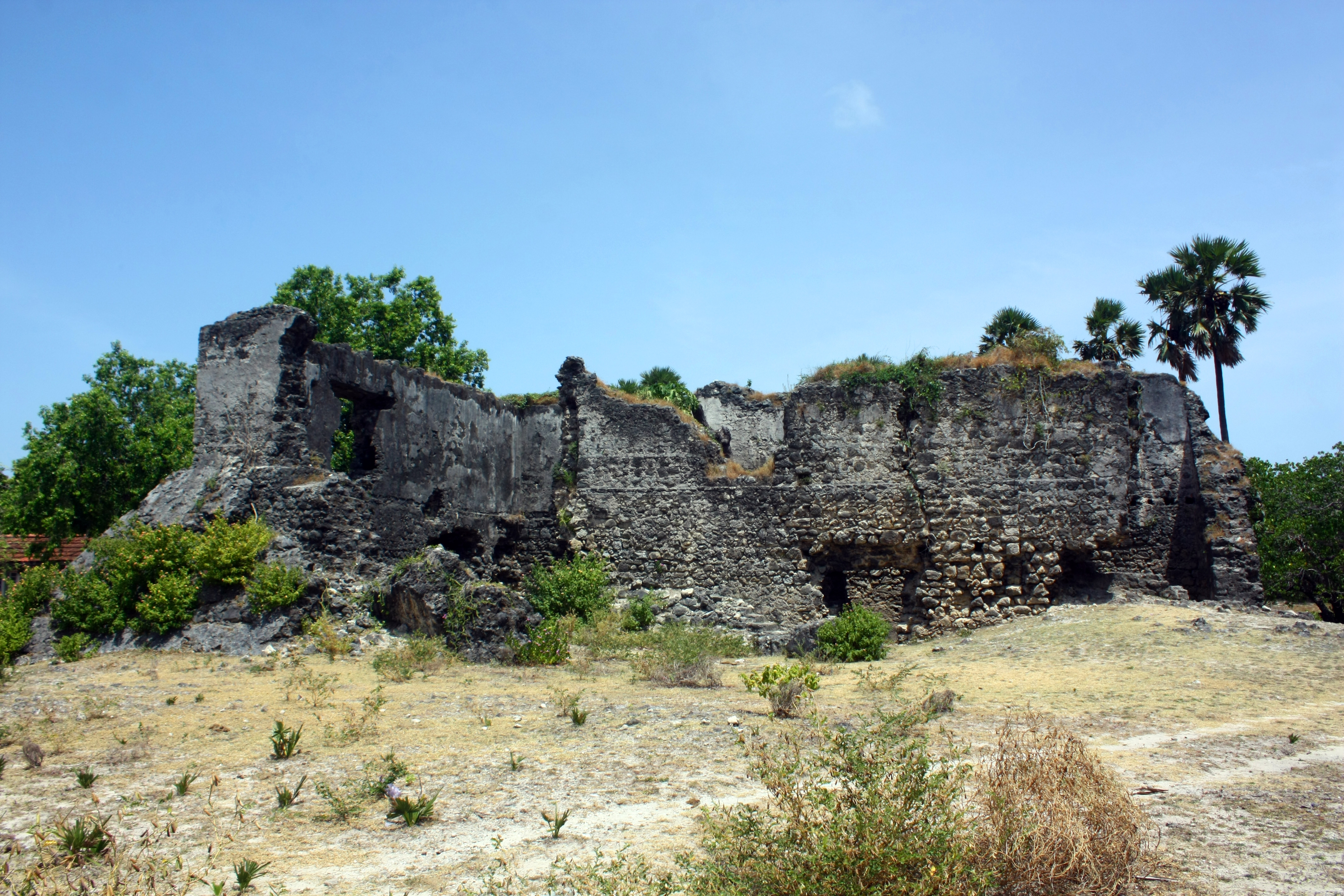
- Delft Island fort

Site information
- Type: Defence fort
- Condition: Ruins

Location
- Coordinates: 9.540736°N 79.677769°E

Site history
- Built by: Portuguese
- Materials: Limestone and coral

Delft Island Fort (Tamil: நெடுந்தீவுக் கோட்டை, romanized: Neṭuntīvuk Kōṭṭai; Sinhala: ඩෙල්ෆ් බලකොටුව, romanized: Delf Balakotuwa, locally known as Neduntheevu fort and Meekaman fort) are ruins of a fort located on the island of Neduntheevu in the Palk Strait in northern Sri Lanka.

Traditionally attributed to the Karaiyar king Meekaman, the fort was probably built by the Portuguese. Later, it was taken over by Dutch, who built a barrack nearby. The island was known to the Portuguese as Ilha das Vacas ("Island of the Cows"), was renamed by the Dutch as Delft Island.

The fort was constructed out of limestone and coral. Ralph Henry Bassett described it as a "very strongly fortified fort", though it is now in ruins.
