= Analaitivu =

Island in Sri Lanka

Native name: அனலைதீவு අන්නලදූව
- Location within Northern Province Location within Sri Lanka

Geography
- Coordinates: 9°40′01″N 79°46′32″E
- Area: 4.82 km^{2} (1.86 sq mi)

Administration
- Sri Lanka
- Province: Northern
- District: Jaffna
- DS Division: Islands North

Demographics
- Population: 1,781 (2012)
- Pop. density: 370/km^{2} (960/sq mi)
- Languages: Tamil
- Ethnic groups: Sri Lankan Tamils

Additional information
- Time zone: Sri Lanka Standard Time Zone (UTC+5:30)

Analaitivu (Tamil: அனலைதீவு, romanized: Aṉalaitīvu; Sinhala: අන්නලදූව Annaladūva) is an island off the coast of Jaffna Peninsula in northern Sri Lanka, located approximately 25 kilometres (16 mi) west of the city of Jaffna. Known as Rotterdam during Dutch colonial rule, the island has an area of 4.82 square kilometres (1.86 sq mi). The island is divided into two Village Officer Divisions (Analaitivu North and Analaitivu South) whose combined population was 1,781 at the 2012 census.

Analaitivu is divided into seven wards, each corresponding to a major settlement. There are a number of Hindu temples and a few churches on the island. The most significant place of worship on the island is the Aianyar Temple, the largest temple dedicated to the Hindu deity in Sri Lanka. The island is served by ferry from the village of Kayts on the neighbouring island of Velanaitivu.

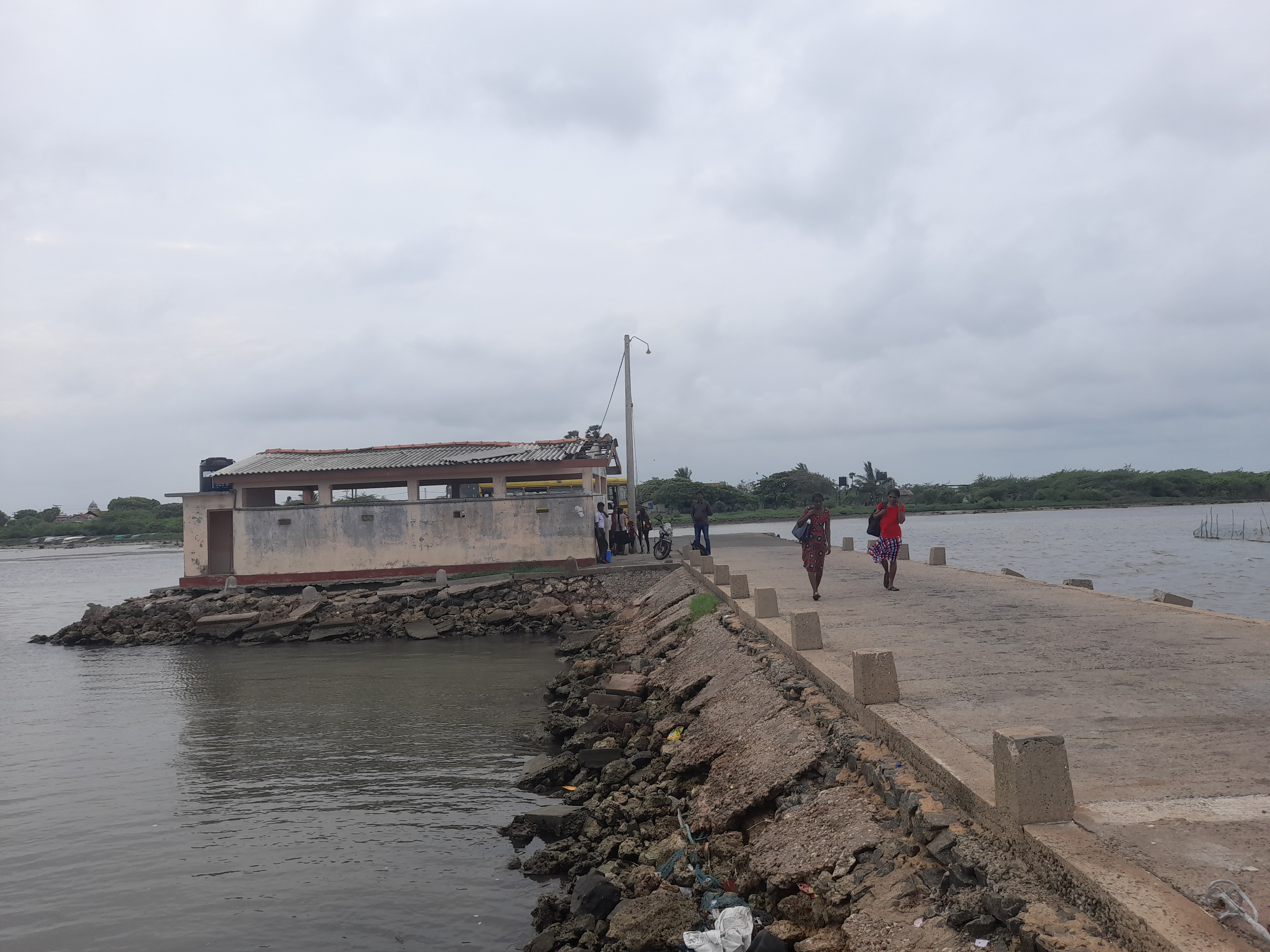
Kayts to Analaitivu Ferry point
