= Eluvaitivu =

Island in Sri Lanka

Native name: எழுவைதீவு එලුවඩූව
- Location within Northern Province Location within Sri Lanka

Geography
- Coordinates: 9°42′03″N 79°48′38″E
- Area: 1.4 km^{2} (0.54 sq mi)

Administration
- Sri Lanka
- Province: Northern
- District: Jaffna
- DS Division: Islands North

Demographics
- Population: 555 (2012)
- Pop. density: 396/km^{2} (1026/sq mi)
- Languages: Tamil
- Ethnic groups: Sri Lankan Tamils

Additional information
- Time zone: Sri Lanka Standard Time Zone (UTC+5:30)

Eluvaitivu (Tamil: எழுவைதீவு, romanized: Eḻuvaitīvu; Sinhala: එලුවඩූව Eluvaḍūva) is an island off the coast of the Jaffna Peninsula in northern Sri Lanka, located approximately 22 kilometres (14 mi) west of the city of Jaffna. Eluvaitivu has several meanings in Tamil including "the island of a landmark" which is derived from the Tamil words elu (mast or tower), vai (land) and tivu (island). The island has an area of 1.4 square kilometres (0.5 sq mi) and had a population of 555 at the 2012 census.

Eluvaitivu has no causeway connecting it to the mainland or other islands but is served by a ferry service from the village of Kayts on the neighbouring island of Velanaitivu. The island is known for its local and migratory birdlife.
