= Puliyantivu (Jaffna) =

Native name: புளியந்தீவு කොටිදූව
- Location within Northern Province Location within Sri Lanka

Geography
- Coordinates: 9°38′52″N 79°46′28″E
- Area: 0.44 km^{2} (0.17 sq mi)

Administration
- Sri Lanka
- Province: Northern
- District: Jaffna
- DS Division: Islands North

Demographics
- Languages: Tamil
- Ethnic groups: Sri Lankan Tamils

Additional information
- Time zone: Sri Lanka Standard Time Zone (UTC+5:30)

Puliyantivu (Tamil: புளியந்தீவு, romanized: Puḷiyantīvu; Sinhala: කොටිදූව Koṭidūva) is an island off the coast of Jaffna Peninsula in northern Sri Lanka, located approximately 26 kilometres (16 mi) west of Jaffna. The island has an area of 0.44 square kilometres (0.17 sq mi). It is known for the Nageswaran Temple.
