= Bone Island =

Island in Sri Lanka

Native name: எலும்புத்தீவு / போன் தீவு
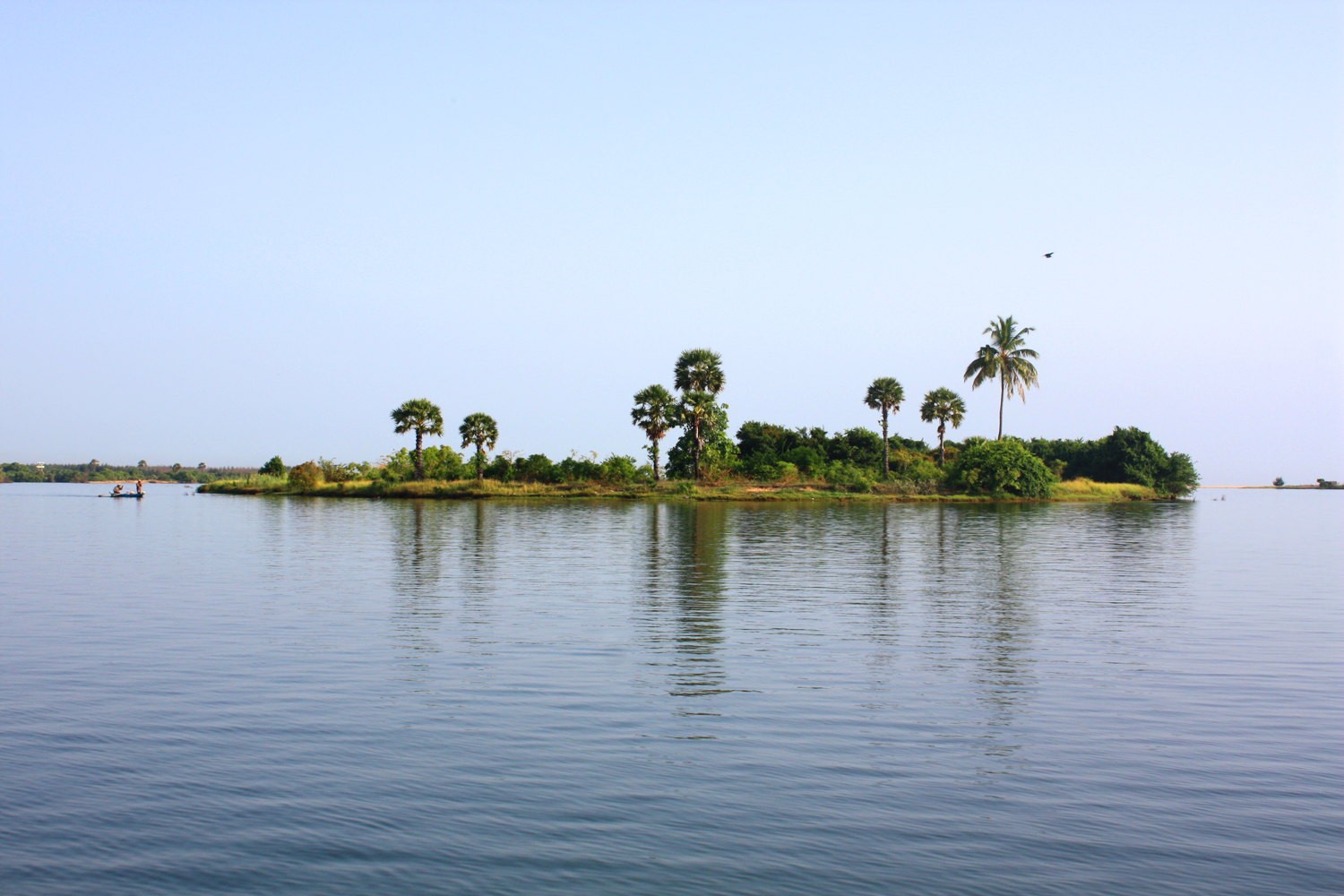
- Bone Island viewed from a boat
- Interactive map of Bone Island

Geography
- Location: Batticaloa
- Coordinates: 7°45′12″N 81°41′24″E

Administration
- Sri Lanka
- Province: Eastern Province
- District: Batticaloa District
- DS Division: Manmunai North
- Largest settlement: Batticaloa

Demographics
- Population: 0 (Batticaloa)

Bone Island (Tamil: எலும்புத்தீவு / போன் தீவு) is a tiny island located in Batticaloa Lagoon. It can only be accessed by boat. It is used as a resting place by local fishermen, and has attracted a large amount of local tourists. J. A. Bone, Asst. Government Agent (1833–1837), built a small bungalow in the island. Later, the island was named after him. The island is a nesting place for cormorants.

== Picture Gallery ==
Bone Island

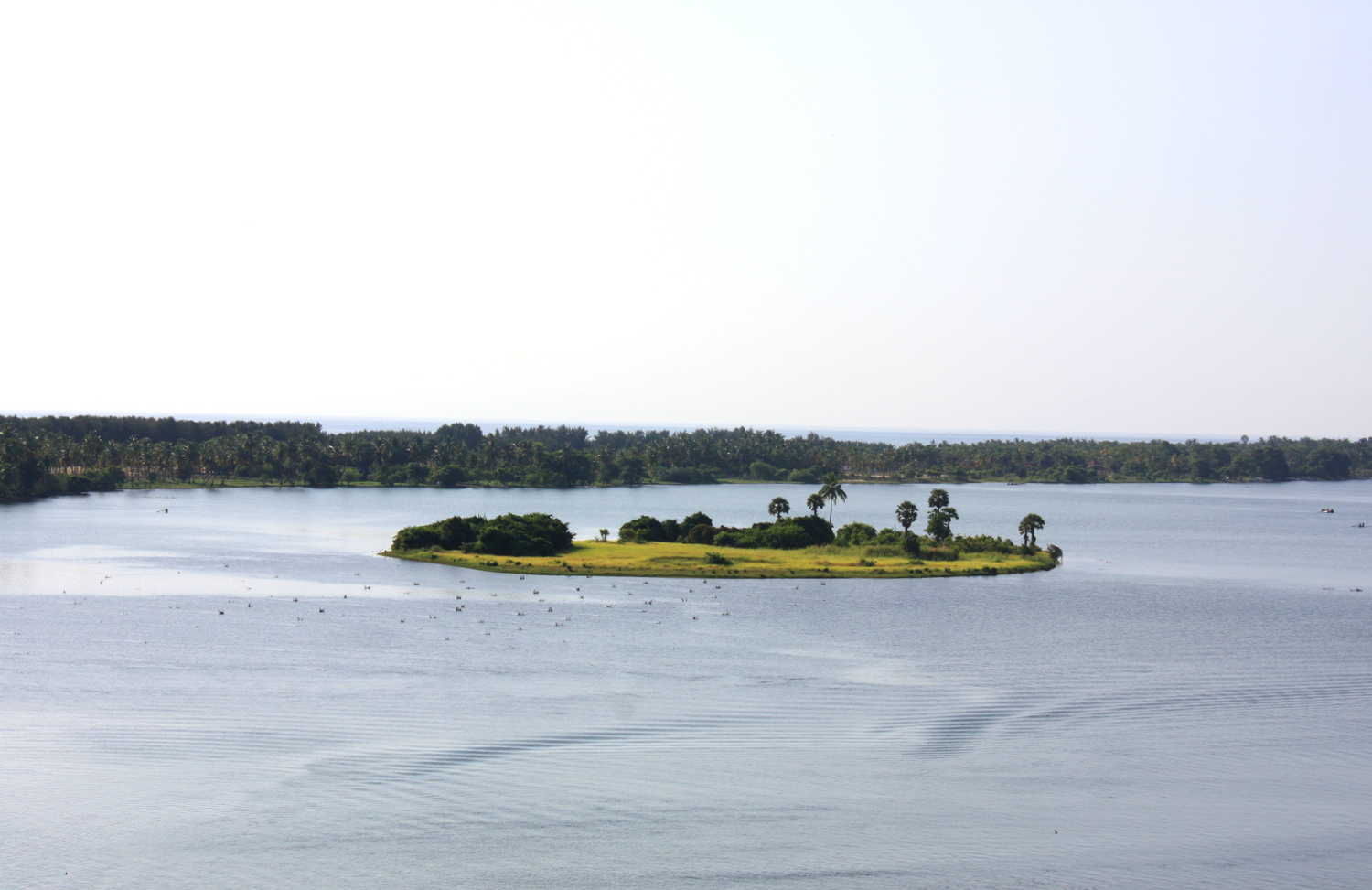
A bird's-eye view of Bone Island

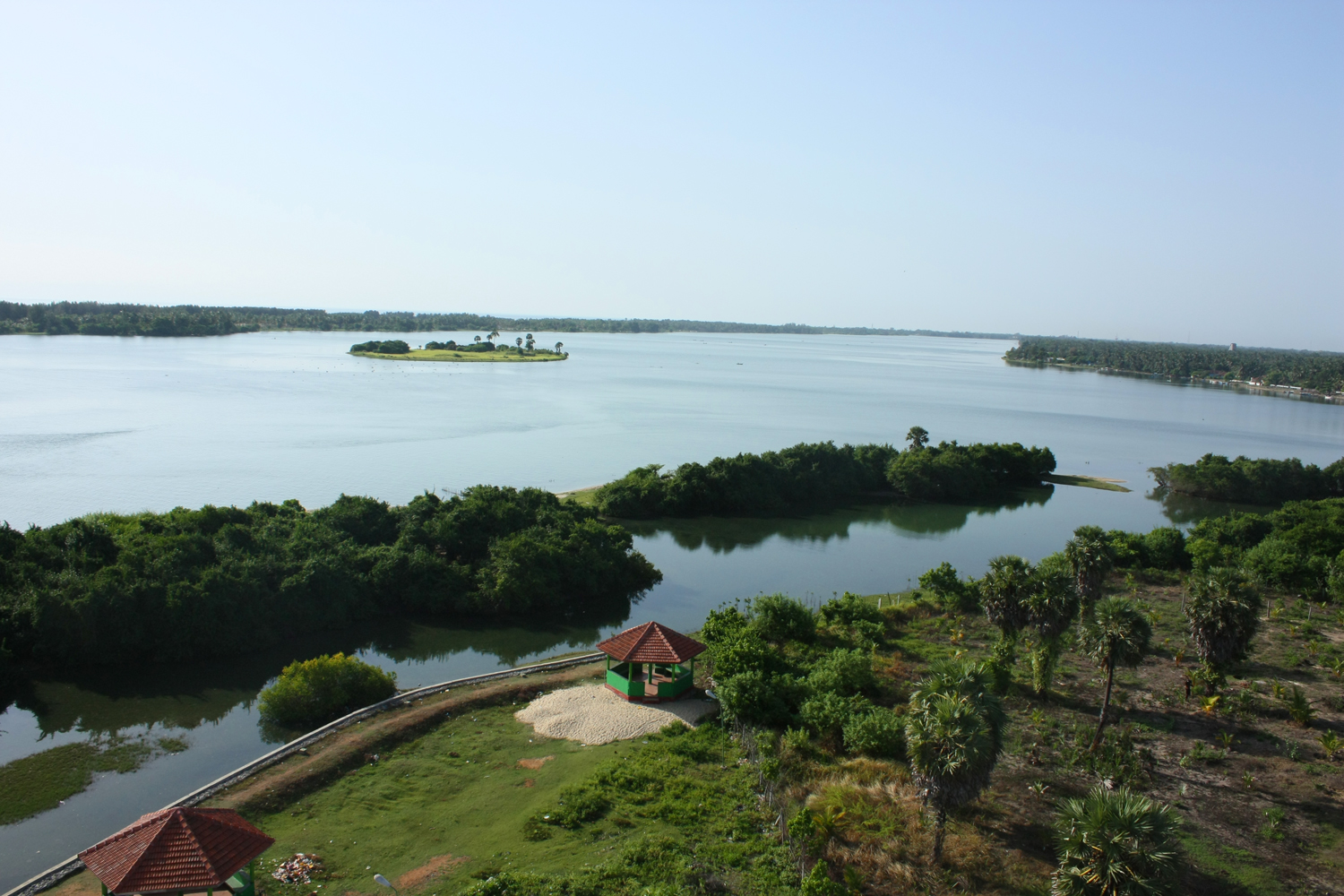
Bird's-eye view – Bone Island in distance (centre)

== See also ==
- List of islands of Sri Lanka
