= Queen's Tower (Neduntheevu) =

- இராணியின் கோபுரம்
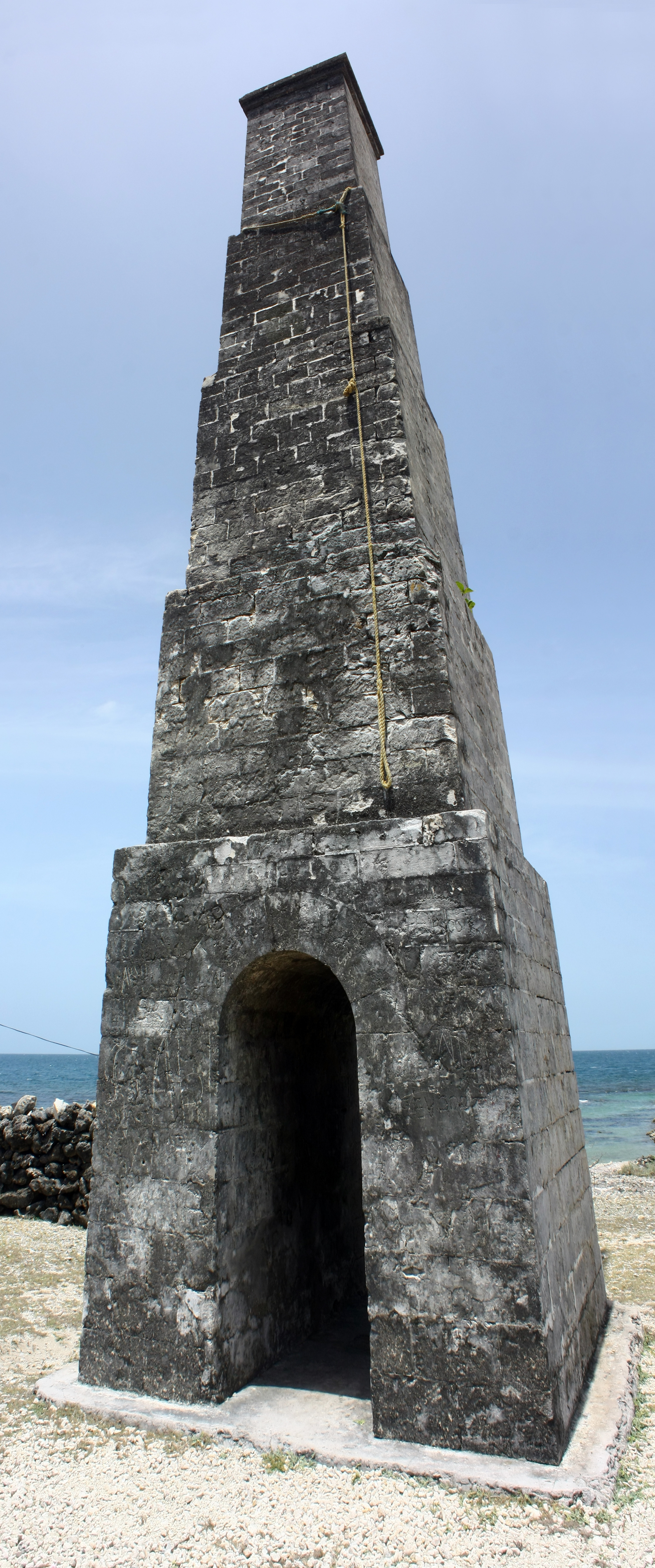
- Queen's Tower (the fire would be set at the bottom

General information
- Type: Lighthouse / tower
- Location: Neduntheevu, Sri Lanka
- Coordinates: 9°28′30.6″N 79°43′12.3″E
- Affiliation: British Ceylon
- Height: 23 feet (7.0 m)

The Queen's Tower (Tamil: இராணியின் கோபுரம்), also known as Quindah Tower; Tamil: குயிண்டாக் கோபுரம்) is a tower that was built by the British during their rule in Sri Lanka. They built it as a trigonometric point and a light navigation point for diurnally operated ships. It is located on the southeastern coast of Neduntheevu, also known as Delft Island.

It was used by the British as a tower to measure the land by setting up an instrument on the top of the tower. However, an incorrect theory suggests that this tower had been used as a lighthouse. According to it, a fire was lit at the bottom which created a vacuum, forcing air upwards. Its light was passed through the tower's chimney-like tube to the top where sailors would be able to see the light from a distance. Another tower known as the "King's Tower" was operated during the period of British rule in Sri Lanka, then Ceylon. Only the basement of the King's Tower survives to this day.
