= Puttalam Lagoon =

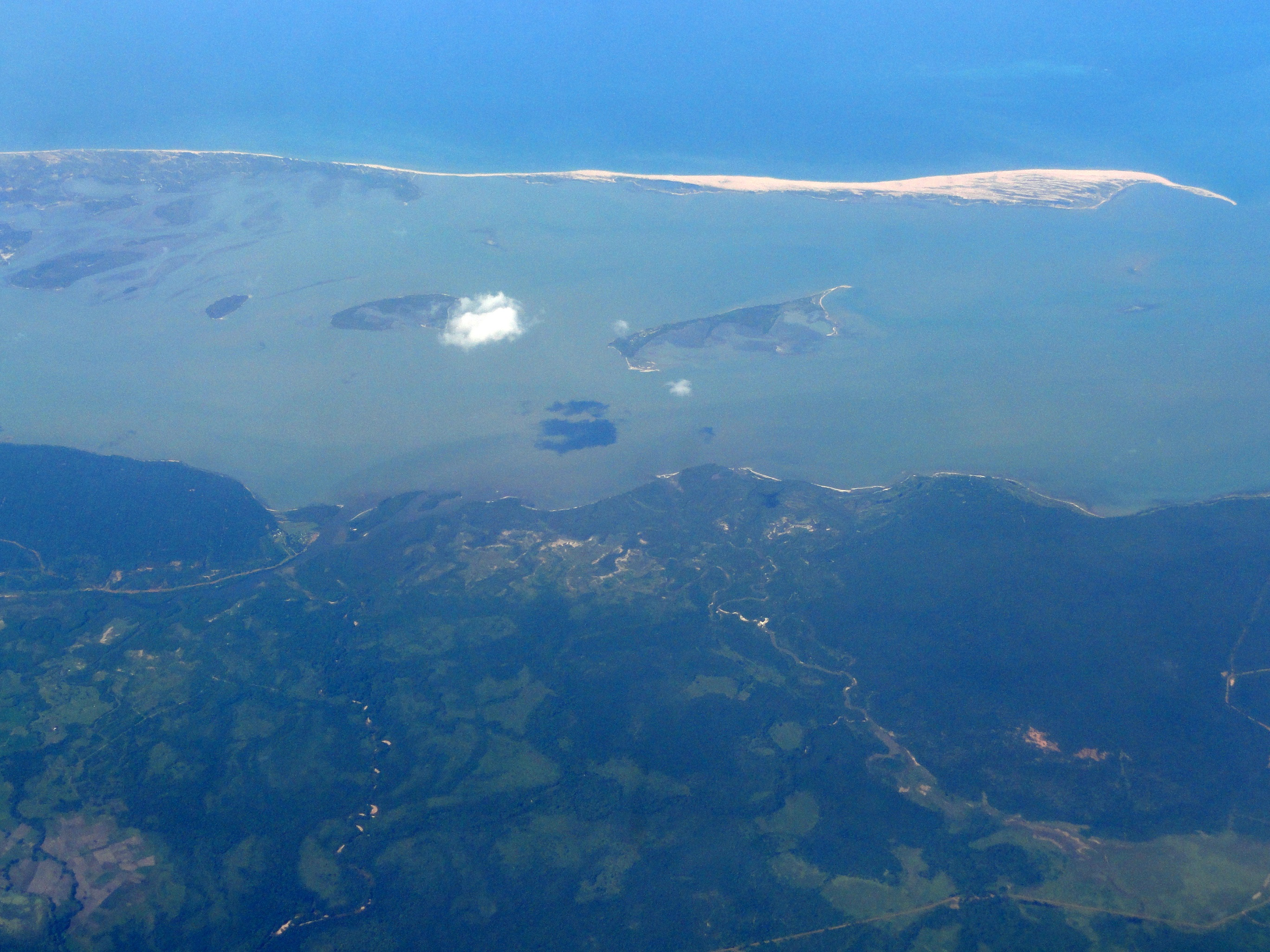
- Aerial view of the northern-half of the lagoon.

- Location within Sri Lanka
- Location: Puttalam
- Coordinates: 08°06′N 79°46′E
- Primary inflows: Kala Oya; Mi Oya
- Basin countries: Sri Lanka
- Max. length: 28 km (17 mi)
- Max. width: 12 km (7 mi)
- Surface area: 327 km^{2} (126 mi^{2})
- Average depth: 1–2 m (3.3–6.6 ft)
- Max. depth: 5 m (16.4 ft)
- Surface elevation: Sea level

The Puttalam Lagoon is a large 327 km^{2} (126 mi^{2}) lagoon in the Puttalam District, western Sri Lanka.

The lagoon is fed by two rivers, namely the Kala Oya and Mi Oya, discharging at 2.2 m^{3}/s (77.7 cu ft/s) and 8.1 m^{3}/s (286.0 cu ft/s) respectively. It is linked to Mundal Lagoon 15 km (9.3 mi) to the south by a channel. The lagoon's water is brackish to saline.

The lagoon is surrounded by a region containing coconuts, open forests, grasslands and shrublands. The land is used for prawn fishing, salt production, and rice cultivation. The lagoon has extensive mangroves, seagrasses and some salt marshes, attracting a wide variety of anatidae.

== Islands ==
A moderate number islands scatter over the lagoon including:

List of islands in the lagoon from north to south
Island	Area	Location
Ippantivu		08°19′45″N 79°48′16″E
Periya Arichchal		08°18′03″N 79°47′50″E
Salliyampiddi		08°17′03″N 79°47′33″E
Oddakarentivu		08°16′35″N 79°45′50″E
Sinna Erumativu		08°16′28″N 79°46′21″E
Erumativu		08°16′04″N 79°46′45″E
Pambativu		08°14′42″N 79°46′33″E
Kilitivu		08°14′27″N 79°46′52″E
Neduntivu		08°14′06″N 79°46′45″E
Mattutivu		08°13′01″N 79°46′59″E
Ambantattivu		08°12′42″N 79°45′58″E
Pullupiddi		08°11′20″N 79°46′40″E
Somativu		08°10′45″N 79°45′22″E
Maripututivu		08°10′33″N 79°44′59″E
Kakativu		08°10′26″N 79°45′22″E
Udayirputi		08°09′52″N 79°48′37″E

== See also ==
- Geography of Sri Lanka
