= Karaitivu (Jaffna) =

Island in Sri Lanka

Native name: காரைதீவு කාර දිවයින
- Location within Northern Province Location within Sri Lanka

Geography
- Coordinates: 9°44′03″N 79°52′33″E
- Area: 22.95 km^{2} (8.86 sq mi)

Administration
- Sri Lanka
- Province: Northern
- District: Jaffna
- DS Division: Karainagar

Demographics
- Population: 9,576 (2012)
- Pop. density: 417/km^{2} (1080/sq mi)
- Languages: Tamil
- Ethnic groups: Sri Lankan Tamils

Additional information
- Time zone: Sri Lanka Standard Time Zone (UTC+5:30)

Karaitivu (Tamil: காரைதீவு, romanized: Kāraitīvu; Sinhala: කාර දිවයින Kãra Divaina) is an island off the coast of the Jaffna Peninsula in northern Sri Lanka, located approximately 15 kilometres (9 mi) north-west of the city of Jaffna.

== Etymology ==
Present Karaitivu has been identified with ancient Kãra Divaina (the Island of Kãra). This island is referred to in the 12th-century Rameswaram Sinhala inscription of King Nissankamalla (1187-1196 A.D.) as "Kãra Divaina". The Nampota, an ancient Sinhala text written after the 14th century, also mentions this island as Kãra Divaina.

Karaitivu means "the island of karai shrubs" in Tamil and is derived from the Tamil words karai (Webera tetrandra, a thorny shrub from the family Rubiaceae) and tivu (island). The island was known as Amsterdam during Dutch colonial rule.

== The island ==
Covering an area of 22.95 square kilometres (8.86 sq mi), the island is divided into nine village officer divisions whose combined population was 9,576 at the 2012 census.

Karaitivu is connected to the Jaffna Peninsula by a causeway and there is a ferry service from the village of Kayts on the neighbouring island of Velanaitivu. Karainagar is the main settlement on the island. The popular Casuarina Beach is located on the island.
