= Portuguese Ceylon =

Portuguese-controlled territory in Asia, 16th–17th century

Coordinates: 2°11′20″N 102°23′4″E

Portuguese Ceylon Ceilão Português (Portuguese) පෘතුගීසි ලංකාව (Sinhala) pṛtugīsi laṁkāva போர்த்துக்கேய இலங்கை (Tamil) Pōrttukkēya ilaṅkai
- 1597–1658
- Flag Coat of arms

- Territorial evolution of Portuguese Ceylon
- Status: Colony of Portugal
- Capital: Colombo
- Common languages: Portuguese (official); Sinhala; Tamil
- Religion: Roman Catholicism
- King of Portugal
  - 1597–1598: Philip I
  - 1598–1621: Philip II
  - 1621–1640: Philip III
  - 1640–1656: John IV
  - 1656–1658: Afonso VI
- Captain-General
  - 1597–1614: Jerónimo de Azevedo
  - 1656–1658: António de Amaral de Meneses
- History
  - Portuguese arrival: 1505
  - Death of Dharmapala of Kotte: 27 May 1597
  - Luso–Kandyan Treaty: 1633
  - Fall of Jaffna: June 1658
Preceded by
Kingdom of Kotte
Kingdom of Jaffna
Kingdom of Sitawaka
Succeeded by
Dutch Ceylon

Portuguese Ceylon (Portuguese: Ceilão Português; Sinhala: පෘතුගීසි ලංකාව; Tamil: போர்த்துக்கேய இலங்கை) was the territory on Ceylon, modern-day Sri Lanka, controlled by the Portuguese Empire between 1597 and 1658.

In Charles Nowell's History of Portugual, he explains the history of this possession:

They won the mastery of Ceylon in a curious way. Several native kingdoms existed on that large island, and the overlord of all was João Paria Pondar, a baptized Christian. Paria Pondar died in 1597, leaving a will in which he named Philip of Portugal and Spain as his heir. On the strength of this the Portuguese moved into Ceylon, but soon several of the local rulers tried to expel them and to resume full independence. A war broke out, which with changing shape and altering personnel lasted for several years. It ended with the Portuguese in control everywhere, and they held the island until the Dutch finally took it from them.

Portuguese presence in the island lasted from 1505 to 1658. Their arrival was largely accidental, and the Portuguese sought control of commerce, rather than territory. They first started having connection with the Kindom of Kotte and were later drawn into the internal politics of the island with the political upheaval of the Wijayaba Kollaya, and used these internal divisions to their advantage during the Sinhalese–Portuguese wars, first in an attempt to control the production of valuable cinnamon and later of the entire island. Direct Portuguese rule did not begin until after the death of Dharmapala of Kotte, who died without an heir, and had bequeathed the Kingdom of Kotte to the Portuguese monarch in 1580. That allowed the Portuguese sufficient claim to the Kingdom of Kotte upon Dharmapala's death in 1597. Portuguese rule began with much resistance by the local population.

Eventually, the Kingdom of Kandy sought help from the Dutch East India Company, with whom they initially entered into agreement. In the Dutch–Portuguese War, the Dutch conquered of most of Portugal's Asian colonies, including Ceylon, between 1638 and 1658.

== See also ==
- List of captain-generals of Portuguese Ceylon
- List of villages in Portuguese Ceylon
- Sinhalese–Portuguese conflicts
- Portuguese India
- Dutch Ceylon
- British Ceylon
- Sri Lankan Kaffirs

== Sources ==
- De Silva, K. M. (1981). A History of Sri Lanka. India: University of California Press. ISBN 0-520-04320-0.
- C. Gaston Pereira, Kandy fights the Portuguese. Sri Lanka: Vijitha Yapa Publications, July 2007. ISBN 978-955-1266-77-6
- Channa Wicremasekera, Kandy at War. Sri Lanka: Vijitha Yapa Publications, 2004. ISBN 955-8095-52-4
- Michael Roberts, Sinhala Consciousness in the Kandyan Period. Sri Lanka: Vijitha Yapa Publications, 2004. ISBN 955-8095-31-1,
- Abeysinghe, Tikiri (2005). Jaffna under the Portuguese. Colombo: Stamford Lake. p. 66. ISBN 955-1131-70-1.
- Kunarasa, K (2003). The Jaffna Dynasty. Johor Bahru: Dynasty of Jaffna King’s Historical Society. p. 122. ISBN 955-8455-00-8.
- Gnanaprakasar, Swamy (2003). A Critical History of Jaffna (review of Yalpana Vaipava Malai). New Delhi: Asian Educational Services. p. 122. ISBN 81-206-1686-3.
- Senaka Weeraratna, Repression of Buddhism in Sri Lanka by the Portuguese (1505 - 1658)
