= Neduntheevu =

Island in Sri Lanka

Native name: நெடுந்தீவு ඩෙල්ෆ්ට්
- Location within Northern Province Location within Sri Lanka

Geography
- Location: Palk Strait
- Coordinates: 9°31′0″N 79°41′0″E
- Area: 62 km^{2} (24 sq mi)
- Length: 11 km (6.8 mi)
- Width: 6 km (3.7 mi)

Administration
- Sri Lanka
- Province: Northern
- District: Jaffna
- DS Division: Delft

Demographics
- Population: ~4,800 (2013)
- Languages: Tamil
- Ethnic groups: Sri Lankan Tamils

Additional information
- Time zone: Sri Lanka Standard Time Zone (UTC+5:30)

Neduntheevu or Neduntivu (Tamil: நெடுந்தீவு, romanized: Neṭuntīvu; Sinhala: ඩෙල්ෆ්ට්, romanized: Ḍelfṭ) (also known by its Dutch name Delft) is an island in the Palk Strait, northern Sri Lanka. This island is named as Delft in the Admiralty Chart unlike the other islands, whose names are Tamil.

== Description ==
Neduntheevu is a flat, roughly oval-shaped island surrounded by shallow waters and beaches of coral chunks and sand. The population consists of Sri Lankan Tamils, mostly living in townships near the north coast. The vegetation is of a semi-arid tropical type, with palmyra palms, dry shrubs and grasses that grow in the pale grey porous coralline soil. Papayas, bananas, coconuts and other plants grow in managed gardens close to people's homes. A naval battle was fought off the coast of the island in 2008 during the Sri Lankan Civil War. There are feral horses on the island, which numbered around 1000 in 2013. These are descendants of the horses brought to the island by the Portuguese, Dutch and British. The island was named after the Dutch city of Delft by Rijckloff van Goens, who named the eight most important islands after Dutch cities.

== History ==
The Portuguese called the island Ilha das Vacas (cow island). They reportedly built a fort, introduced horses, and prepared pasture land for them. The Dutch colonised the island in a more organised way and also introduced horses, followed by the British in the early 19th century, during which time the iconic coral walls were built. The British introduced flax plants for canvas and yet more horses to the island, instituting a horse breeding program to meet the demand for horses from the cavalry. Eventually the horse population expanded beyond the island's ability to produce fodder for them, and many were taken to the island of Iranaitivu.

From 1811 to 1824 the island was ruled by one Lieutenant Nolan of the 4th Ceylon Regiment who is credited with making low drywalls in the Irish style, without mortar, and constructing wells to provide water for the horses, which continue to be the island's main source of freshwater as of 2013. Lt. Nolan also had children with a number of local women during his time there, and even today there are many locals on the island who have inherited his grey eyes.

== Demographics ==
Nearly 95% of the inhabitants of Neduntheevu are Catholics, and the remainder are Hindu. The large number of Catholics has been explained by the long period of Dutch influence on the island, from the 15th to the 17th century. This is the reason why all old buildings feature Dutch architecture, and why many local families have Dutch surnames. There are also 18 Hindu Kovils (temples) on the island, some of which are ancient. Economic activity on the island consists of fishing, raising livestock and poultry, and the manufacture of palmyra palm products. The island's inhabitants are concentrated in areas with better soil which are less prone to flooding. Poverty levels are high with over one third of families receiving Samurdhi benefits (food stamps and other means-tested government assistance).

Estimated population
| Year | Population |
|---|---|
| 1960 | 12,000 |
| 1981 | 6,200 |
| 2007 | 4,124 |
| 2013 | 4,800 |

Many inhabitants were displaced from their homes on the island during the Sri Lankan Civil War, mostly around 1990, and only some have returned after the end of the conflict. As a result there are many abandoned properties on the island.

== Issues ==
The scarcity and quality of drinking water on the island has become a problem for residents, tourists, and the feral horse population on Neduntheevu. Shallow wells were dug in the early 19th century but these wells, including the famous 'Devil's Well', do not produce enough water for the population, and the water has become saline due to seawater intrusion. As of 2024, the naturally-occurring reservoirs had dried up. Drinking water is brought over by boat from the mainland but this is expensive and inconvenient.

It is thought that the island was cleared for agriculture in ancient times, and that grazing animals prevented the regrowth of trees. Even today, the majority of the island is made up of pastoral grazing land. Most households have cattle or goats. Due to a lack of fodder, many households let their cattle roam freely, and they compete for grazing with the island's feral horses.

Although manufacturing existed in the past, the civil war put an end to most organised economic activities other than subsistence farming and fishing. The only factory on the island is the sewing center which is run by the Sri Lankan Navy. The Navy also provides some of the ferry services to and from the island.

Unemployment, especially youth unemployment, is high, even among those with higher qualifications, resulting in emigration to the mainland. To support the island's largest source of income, the Fishery Cooperative Society buys all the fish caught, provides loans, rental of various equipment and the sale of necessities.

Healthcare is very poor on the island, with serious illnesses and childbirth referred to the hospital at Kayts on Velanai Island which is over an hour away by boat. Snakebite is one of the most common medical problems on the island. The hospital is under-staffed, partly due to the fact that the facilities and housing are poor so the island is not seen by doctors as a desirable place to work.

As of 2013, organised waste disposal was not present on the island, with litter and animal carcasses a common sight on the island.

== Transport ==
The island is accessed via a one-hour ferry ride from the island of Kurikadduwan, which is connected by road to Jaffna, one hour away. As of 2013, the Sri Lanka Navy organises the ferries and staffs the jetties, and the ferries are a mixture of public and privately owned, and there are three services per day. As of 2013 there were six ferries, having capacity for between 100-160 people, and all of which were in poor condition. On Neduntheevu, buses, three-wheelers and small lorries form the basis of motorised transport.

The main road is tarred and links the jetty at Punkudutive with Koddaikadu village on the other side of the island.

== Services ==
As of 2013 there were nearly 100 police officers on the island. There are a range of banks and credit institutions operating on the island, including the Bank of Ceylon, the Delft Cooperative Society, the Fishery Cooperative Society and others.

== Archaeological ruins ==
Archaeological remains found on the island indicate the island has been inhabited since ancient times. In the north-western part of the island, there are the ruins of an ancient Buddhist temple. The remains of a Hindu temple built in the Chola style in the 10th or 11th century as well as the ruins of a Dutch colonial fort have been identified on the west coast.

=== Inscriptions ===
In 2013, marine archaeologists from the Maritime Archaeology Unit (MAU) of the Central Cultural Fund (CCF) discovered a few eroded coral slabs containing Tamil script. According to their early suggestions, these Tamil scripts belong to the 14th to 15th centuries. However, as another coral slab engraved in modern English script was discovered on the same site in the same eroded condition, it was later identified that all these inscribed slabs were from much more recent times.

== See also ==
- Queen's Tower (Neduntheevu)

== Gallery ==
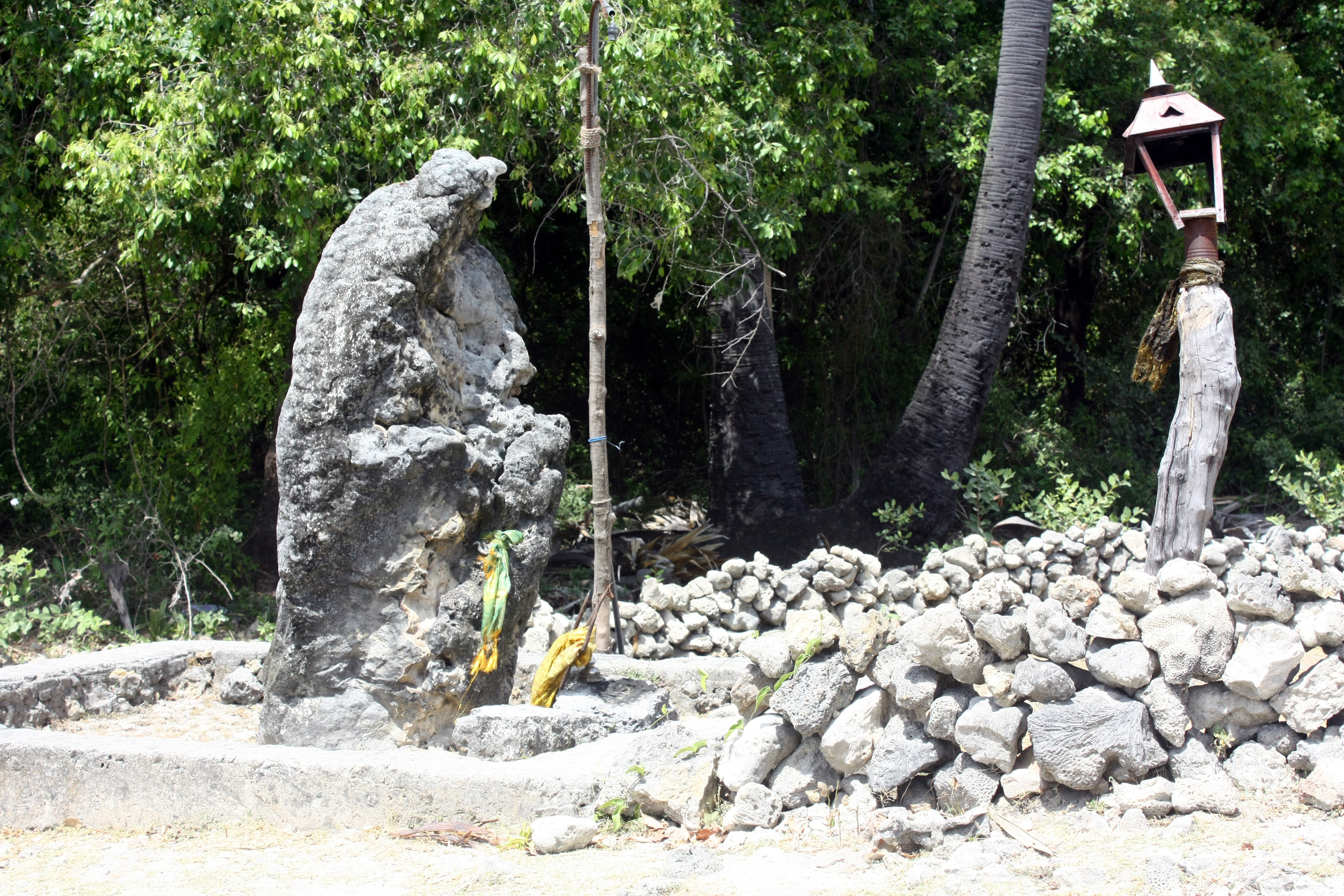
Growing Rock, observed to be accreting

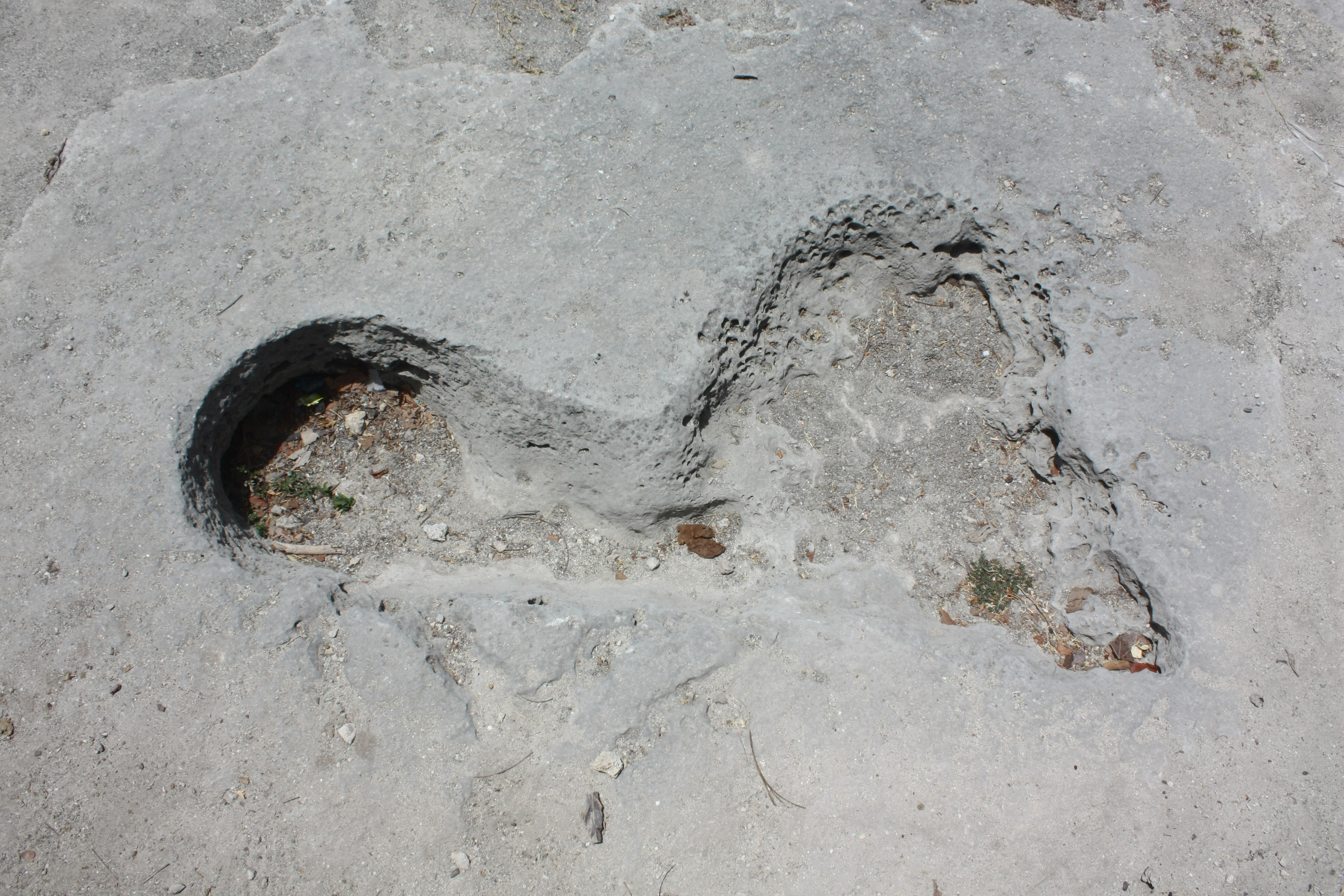
Giant footprint, also known as Adam's or Shiva's footprint

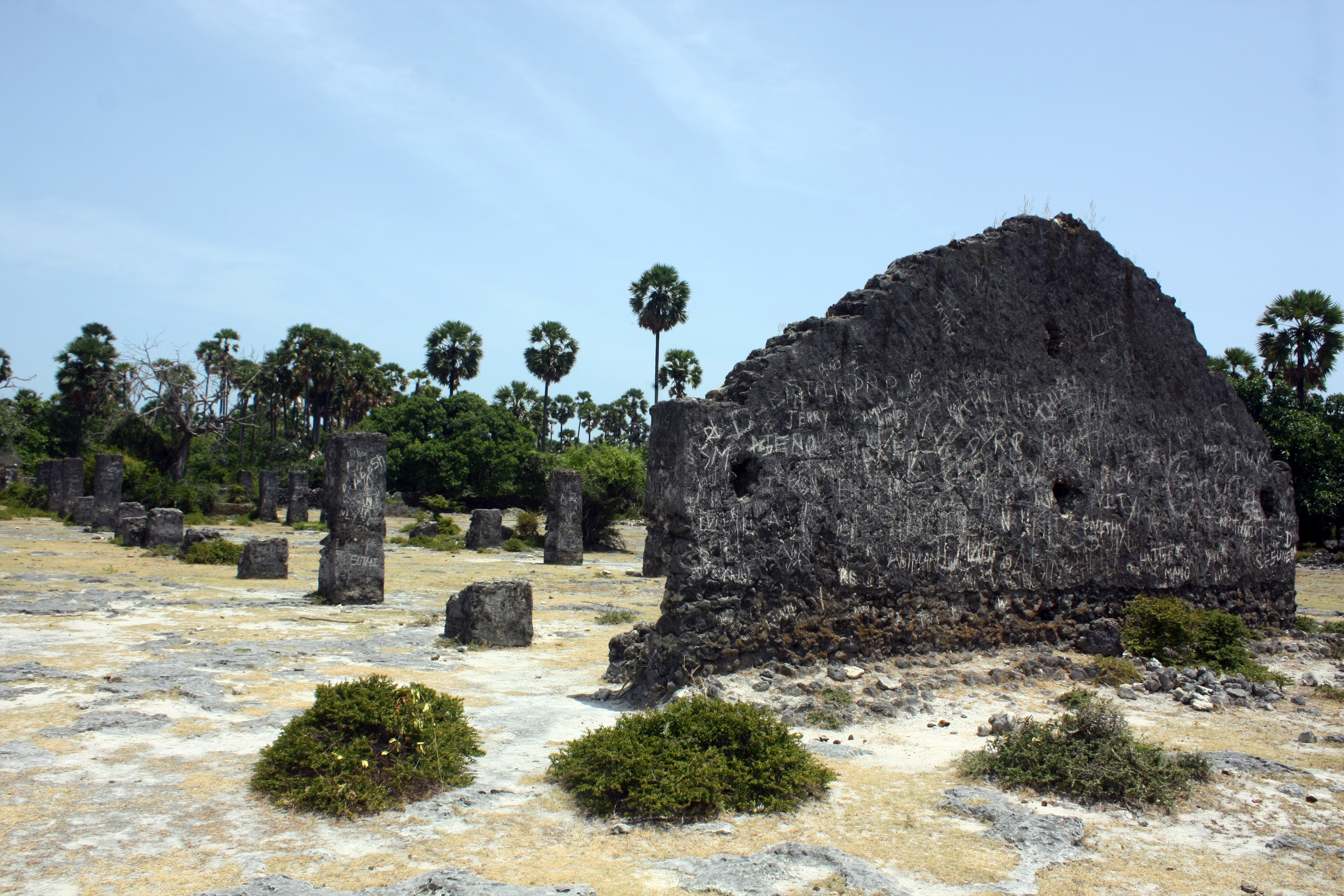
Stable remains

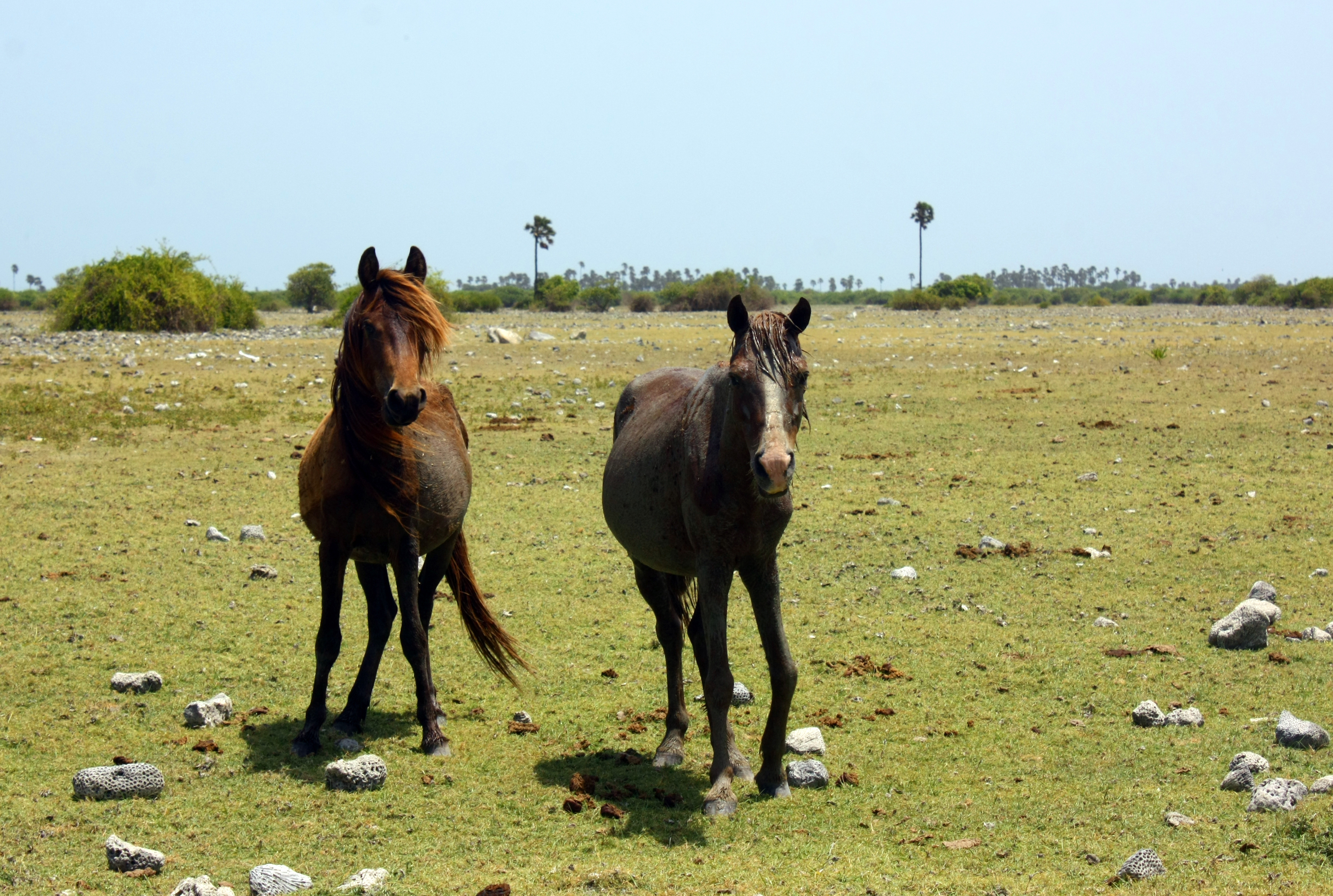
Feral ponies

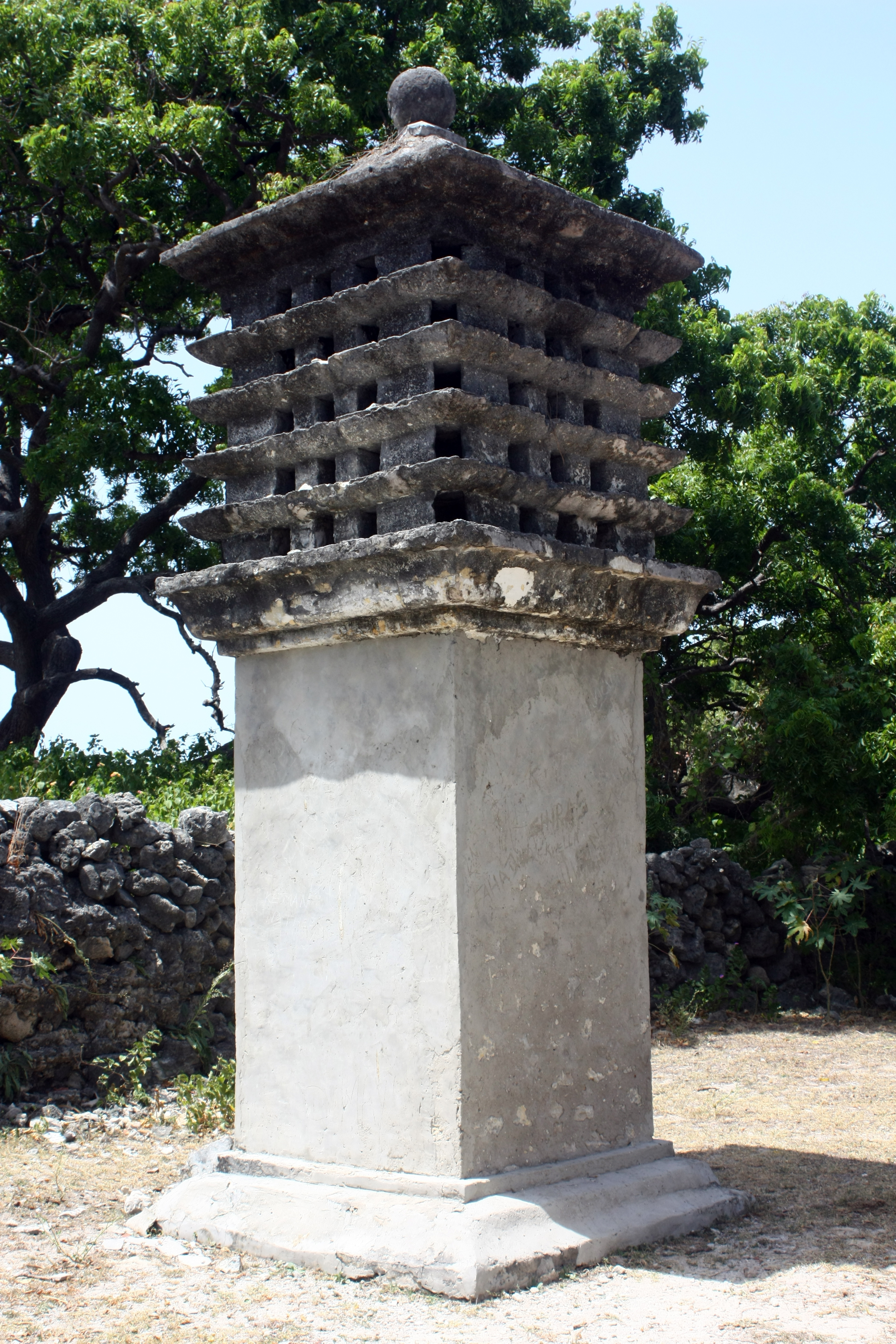
Pigeon house (dovecote), from colonial times

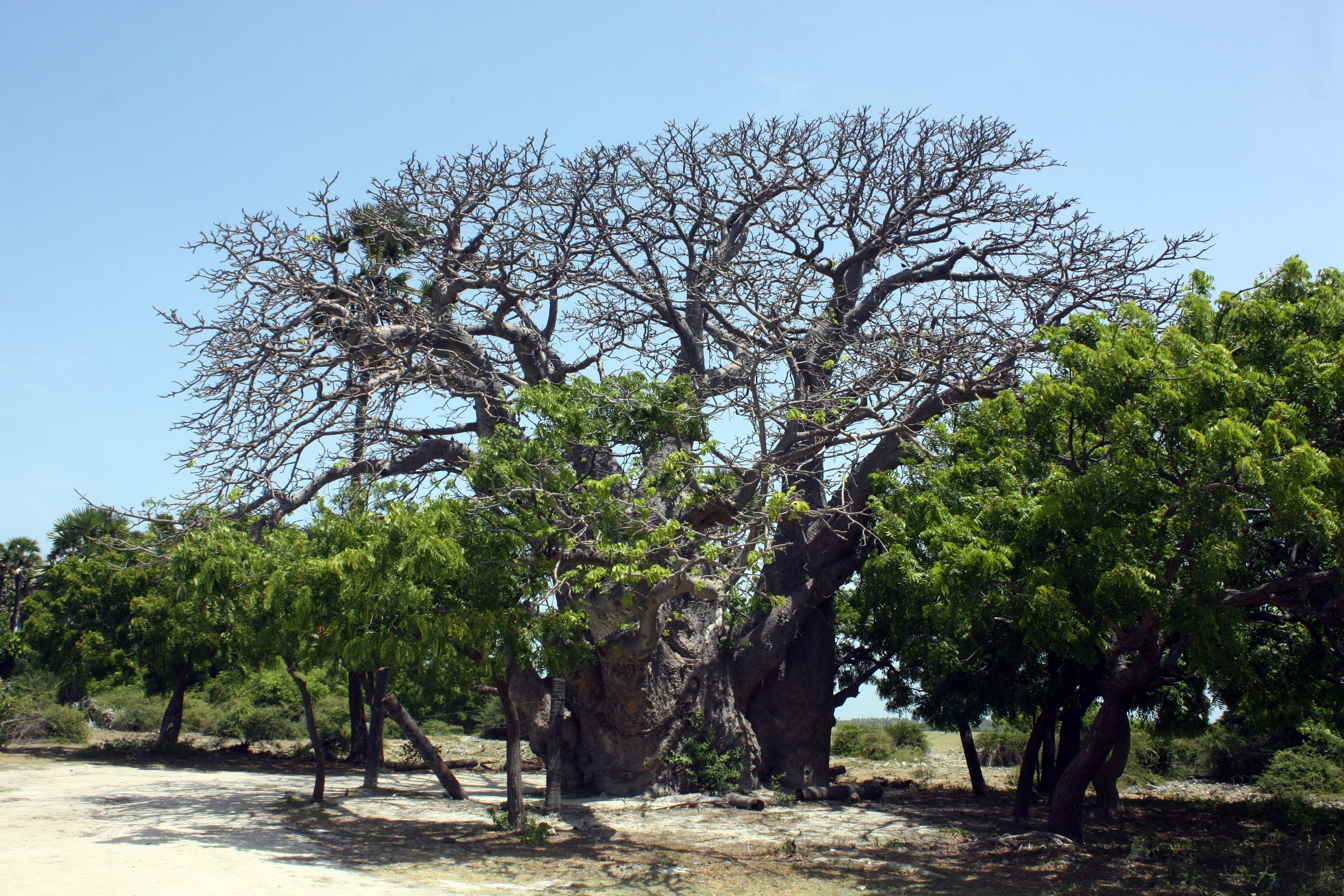
Baobab (Adansonia digitata), native to East Africa, introduced by Arabian sailors in the 7th century

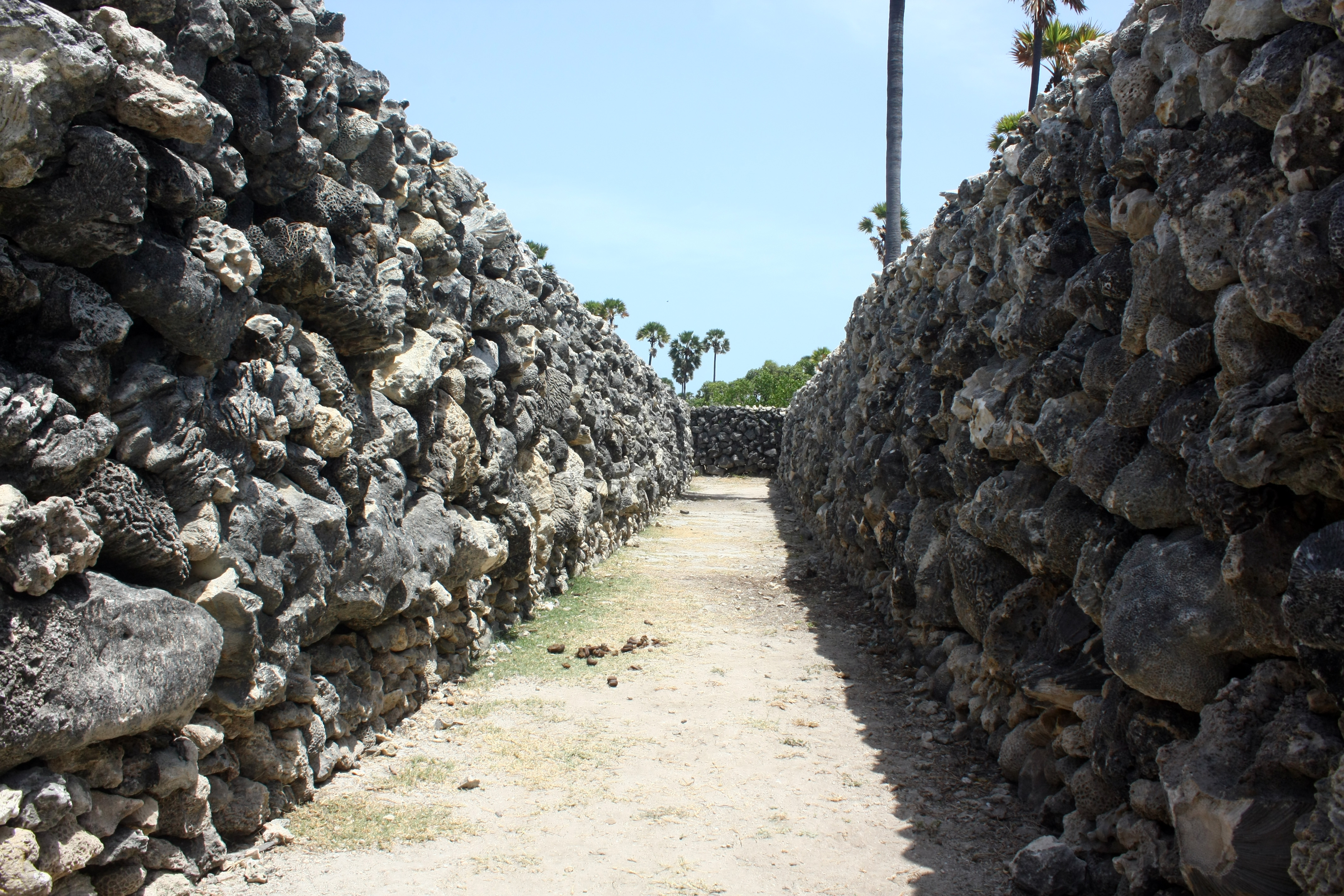
Coral walls, a common sight

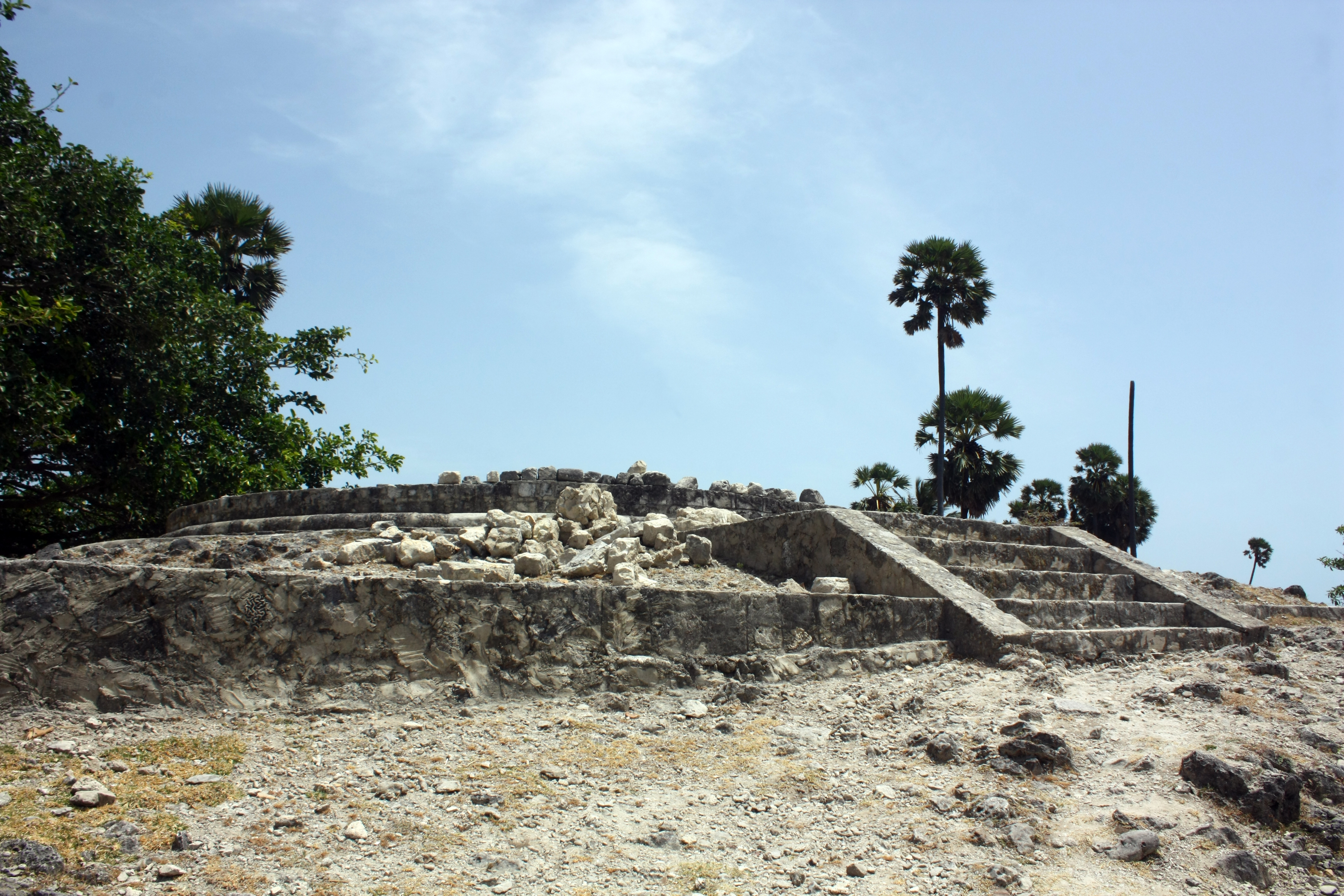
Ruins believed to be an ancient temple or Vedi Arasan fort.

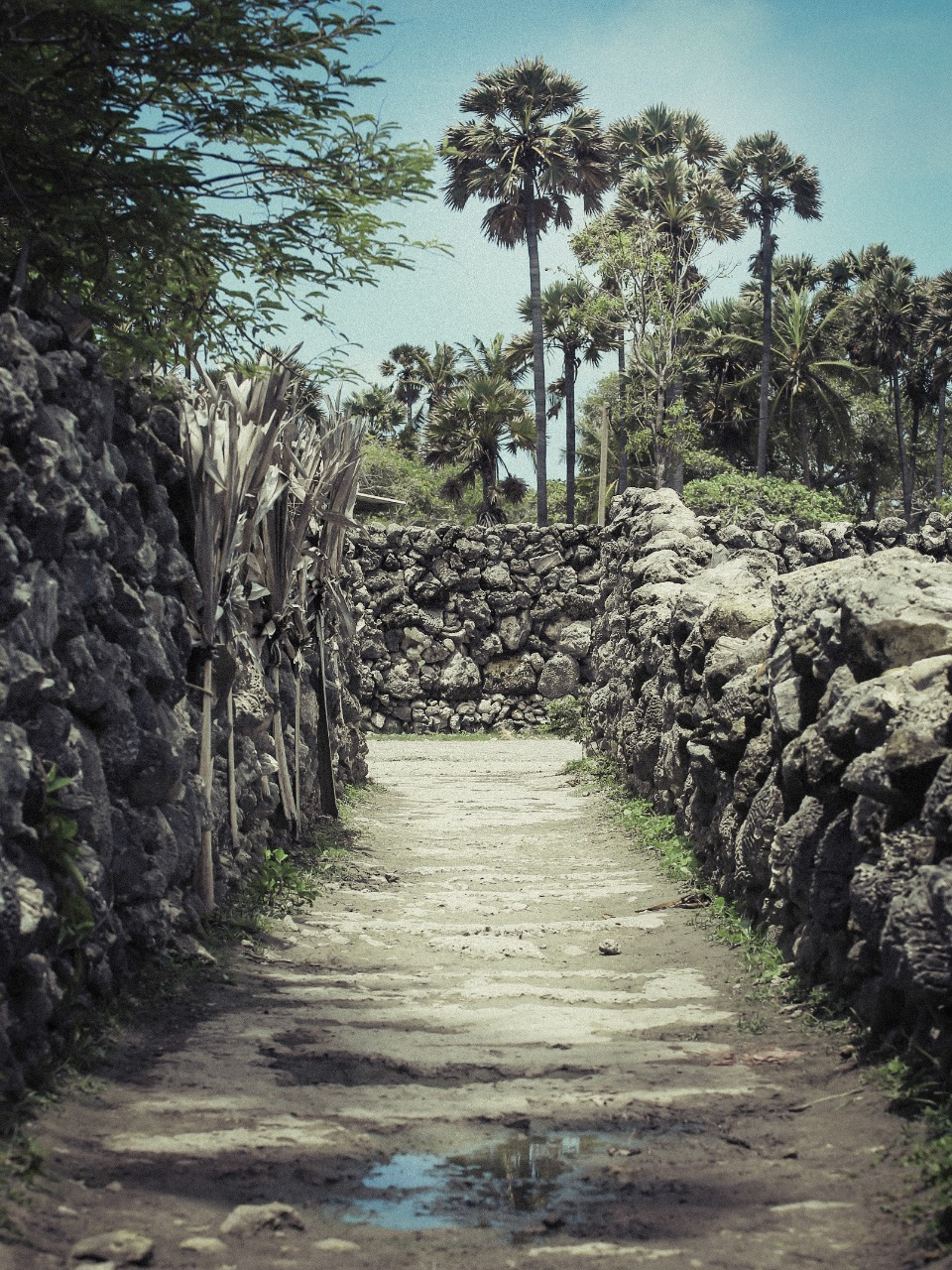
The Manmade Coral Walls of Delft

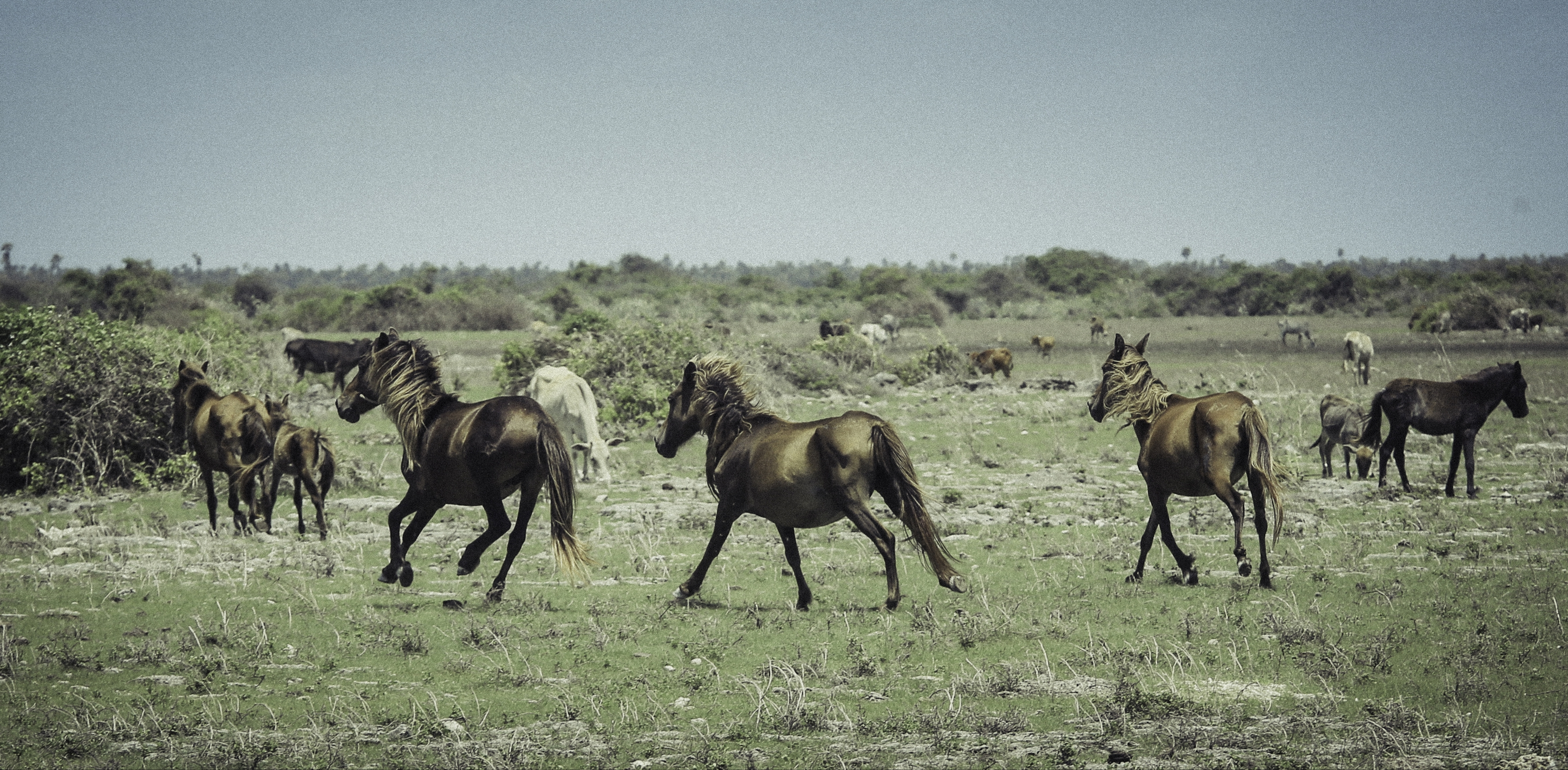
Wild horses
