= Iranaitivu =

Island of Sri Lanka

Native name: இரணைதீவு රනදූව/එරන්දූව
- Location within Northern Province Location within Sri Lanka

Geography
- Location: Gulf of Mannar
- Coordinates: 9°17′31″N 79°58′54″E

Administration
- Sri Lanka
- Province: Northern
- District: Kilinochchi
- DS Division: Poonakary

Demographics
- Languages: Tamil
- Ethnic groups: Sri Lankan Tamils

Additional information
- Time zone: Sri Lanka Standard Time Zone (UTC+5:30)

Iranaitivu (Tamil: இரணைதீவு, romanized: Iraṇaitīvu; Sinhala: රනදූව/එරන්දූව, romanized: Ranadūva/Erandūva) is an island of Sri Lanka, located in the Gulf of Mannar and part of Kilinochchi District within the Northern Province. The site of a Sri Lanka Armed Forces base since 1992, the island is being repopulated by former inhabitants, who began returning in 2018.

== Geography ==
Iranaitivu is a double island, with two parts joined by a neck of land; the name means "the twin islands". The larger island, Periyathivu, Periatheevu, or Iranaitivu North, was dubbed Enkhuizen by the Dutch East India Company; the other island, Sinnathivu, Sinnatheevu, or Iranaitivu South, was dubbed Hoorn, both after ports the company used for the East Indies trade. It is in the Gulf of Mannar in north west Sri Lanka and is part of Kilinochchi District; Neduntheevu (Delft Island) is nearby.

== Inhabitants ==
The island has historically been inhabited by Tamil fishers; it has a rich fishery. There are Catholic churches on both sections, Our Lady of Rosary on Periathivu and St. Sebastian's on Sinnathivu.

During the Sri Lankan Civil War, the island was within the area of military conflict; on 29 September 1998 Lionair Flight 602 was shot down by Tamil Tigers from there, and in February 2003, during peace negotiations, a suicide incident with Tigers who had been smuggling armaments took place off the island. The Sri Lanka Navy built a base there and in 1992 the remaining islanders all moved to the village of Iranamata Nagar on the mainland, abandoning their houses and cattle. According to the navy, the depopulation of the island was voluntary; the inhabitants say they were not allowed to stay and that since 2009, except for annual Good Friday observances the islanders, women in particular, had been forbidden to return even during the daytime, despite petitions and protests including a continuous 359-day protest on a beach. C. V. Vigneswaran, then the Chief Minister of the Northern Province, and Paul Godfrey, chargé d'affaires of the European Union delegation to Sri Lanka, both wrote to the Government of Sri Lanka describing the islanders as "displaced" and requesting they be allowed to return.

On 23 April 2018, a predominantly female group of about 300 former islanders accompanied by priests, journalists and human rights activists crossed in approximately 40 white-flagged fishing boats from Iranamata Nagar to Iranaitivu to re-establish residence there. They were surprised not to be prevented from landing; the naval patrol vessel had been moved into deeper water; and when naval officers approached them after they held prayer in the ruined church, those with land deeds were permitted to remain overnight. A month later, the government granted permission for all the approximately 400 families to return to live on the island.

As of February 2019 the navy have rebuilt the church on Periyathivu, constructed a jetty and paths, and provided water, machinery and spare parts. Solar-powered batteries to recharge mobile phones have been donated, and residents have begun restoring wells, but with a lack of power and inadequate drinking water supplies, and houses, the hospital and the school needing to be rebuilt, many residents live on the island only part of the week, and children cannot move from the mainland for the time being. The navy retains 9 acres of land on which it continues to operate the base, for strategic reasons and to check illegal fishing by Indians and drug smuggling. According to the Sri Lanka Secretariat for Coordinating Reconciliation Mechanisms, almost 4,241 acres of land taken for military use during the Civil War is still in military hands.

On 2 March 2021, the island was designated as the burial site for COVID-19 victims from the minority Muslim and Christian communities who opposed cremations.
