= Mundal Lagoon =

Mundal Lagoon මුන්දලම කලපුව முந்தல்
- Location within Sri Lanka
- Location: Puttalam District, Sri Lanka
- Coordinates: 7°47′N 79°49′E
- Type: Lagoon
- Primary outflows: Indian Ocean
- Surface area: 33.61 square kilometres (12.98 sq mi)
- Max. depth: 3 metres (9.8 ft)
- Surface elevation: Sea level
- Settlements: Mundal

Mundal Lagoon (Sinhala: මුන්දලම කලපුව,Tamil: முந்தல், Muntal) is a lagoon in Puttalam District, western Sri Lanka. The lagoon is sometimes referred to as Mundal Lake.

The lagoon is linked to Puttalam Lagoon to the north by a channel. The lagoon's water is brackish.

The lagoon is surrounded by a region containing rice paddies, coconut plantations and scrubland. The land is used for prawn fishing and rice cultivation.

The lagoon has mangrove swamps, salt marshes and sea grasses. The lagoon attracts a wide variety of water birds including herons, egrets, terns and other shorebirds.
