= Island North Divisional Secretariat =

- Divisional Secretariat
- Interactive map of Island North Divisional Secretariat
- Country: Sri Lanka
- Province: Northern Province
- District: Jaffna District
- Time zone: UTC+5:30 (Sri Lanka Standard Time)

Island North Divisional Secretariat is a Divisional Secretariat of Jaffna District, of Northern Province, Sri Lanka.

== Demography-Religion ==
Religion in Island North DS Division (2012)
1. Buddhist (0.20%)
2. Hindu (54.7%)
3. Muslim (0.00%)
4. Roman Catholic (41.1%)
5. Other Christian (3.90%)
6. Other (0.00%)
