= William Sharpington =

British lettering artist (1900–1973)

- Born: 1900; Kennington, London, England
- Died: 1973 (aged 72–73); Downe, London, England
- Occupation: Lettering artist
- Employer: City and Guilds of London Art School
- Spouse: Claire Sharpington (m. 1933)

William Sharpington (Note: Sharpington was sometimes called W. H. Sharpington. His middle name is not stated in sources.) (1900–1973) was a British lettering artist who worked in sign painting and the design of monuments. (Note: Sharpington preferred the term "lettering artist" to describe his work, rather than "sign writing", feeling that the term did not do lettering work due credit, something both Jackson and DuVivier independently remembered about him when interviewed separately.) In the view of John Nash and Gerald Fleuss, his workshop "produced, from the 40s to the 60s, some of the most distinguished public lettering in England".

== Early life ==
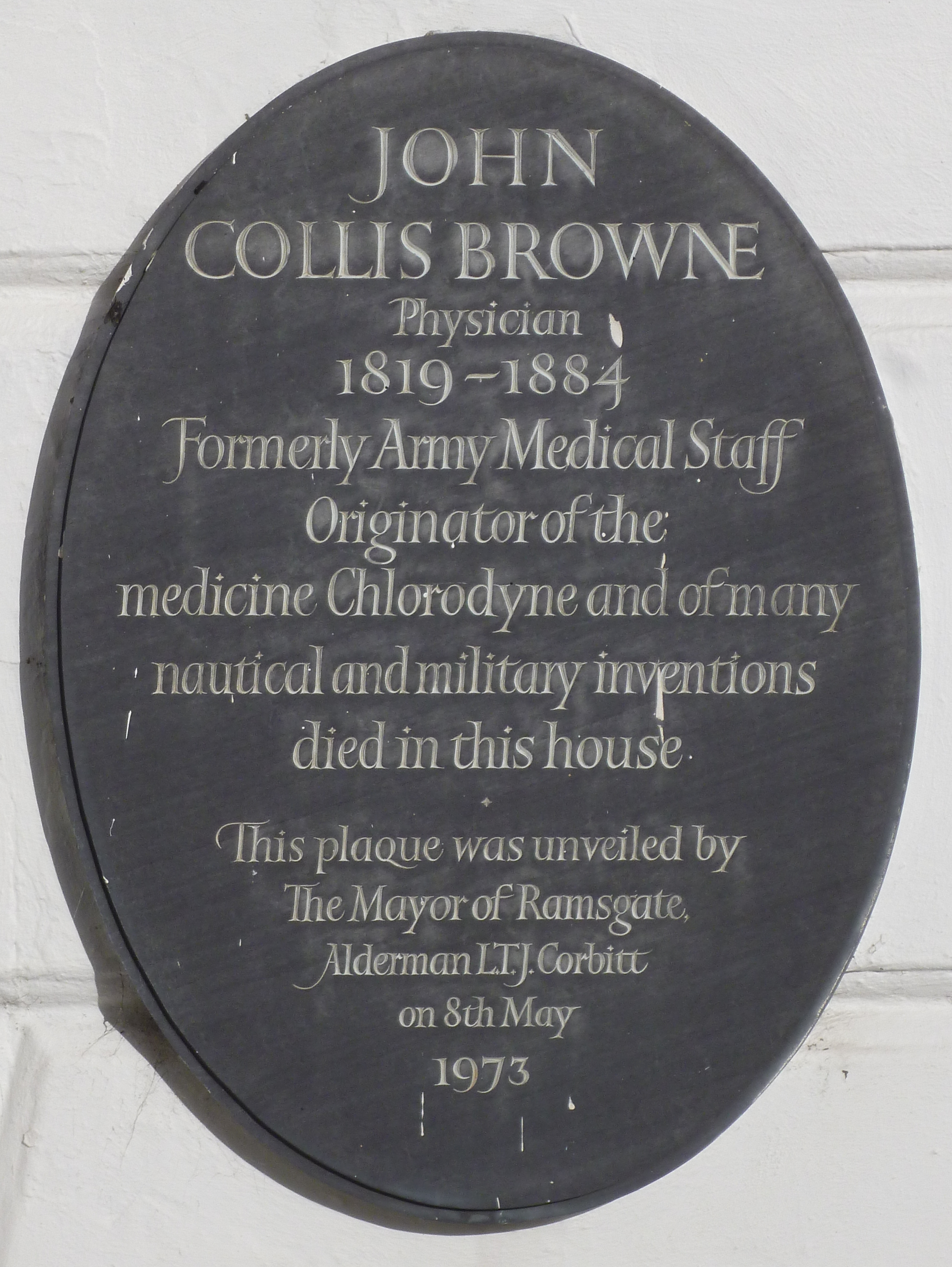
Memorial to John Collis Browne, Ramsgate

The son of a baker, Sharpington studied at the City and Guilds of London Art School and started his career working as an assistant in the workshop of Percy Delf Smith from about 1920 to 1935. He then set up his own practice which continued through the post-war period. At the time it was normal to use custom painted or carved lettering for large signs because of the inflexibility of printing large fonts using letterpress, before the arrival of large-size printing technologies like vinyl sign cutters and computer fonts.

== Career ==
Delf Smith and his teacher Edward Johnston, influenced by the Arts and Crafts movement, had established a style of fine lettering rooted in Roman square capitals which had quickly become a standard for prestigious lettering like monuments and memorials. Sharpington also worked in this style, with use of italics, calligraphy and swashes. (Note: His Collis Browne memorial uses a capital-form q in lower-case italic, a style used in renaissance calligraphy and by some twentieth-century Arts and Crafts artists, it is used for example in Jamie Smith's English Engravers typeface.) Nick Garrett, a modern day London based Traditional signwriter, comments that

I had worked alongside his lettering in the House of Lords some years earlier and they left such a lasting impression ... Sharpington's work is of course notably classical, yet each letter was made from his own passion for calligraphic rendering. The structures are strongly reminiscent of the original Trajan (Roman) and Jensen (Venetian) inspirational characters.

— Nick Garrett

Sharpington's style uses the general square letterform spacing of the Trajan capitals. He also combined lowercase letters in upright and italic variations. Lower case letterforms arrived in the late 8th and early 9th centuries with the emergence of Carolingian minuscule — a calligraphic penned script championed under Charlemagne to bring clarity and consistency to writing across Europe. Developed by scholars such as Alcuin of York, it introduced the forms that later evolved into the printed versions of lowercase alphabets we use today. Sharpington's variation

is very different to the Italian Trajan style. It has a calligraphic voice crafted around its Delf Smith cultural and architectural context.

— Nick Garrett

Lettering examples by Sharpington are held by the Crafts Study Centre.

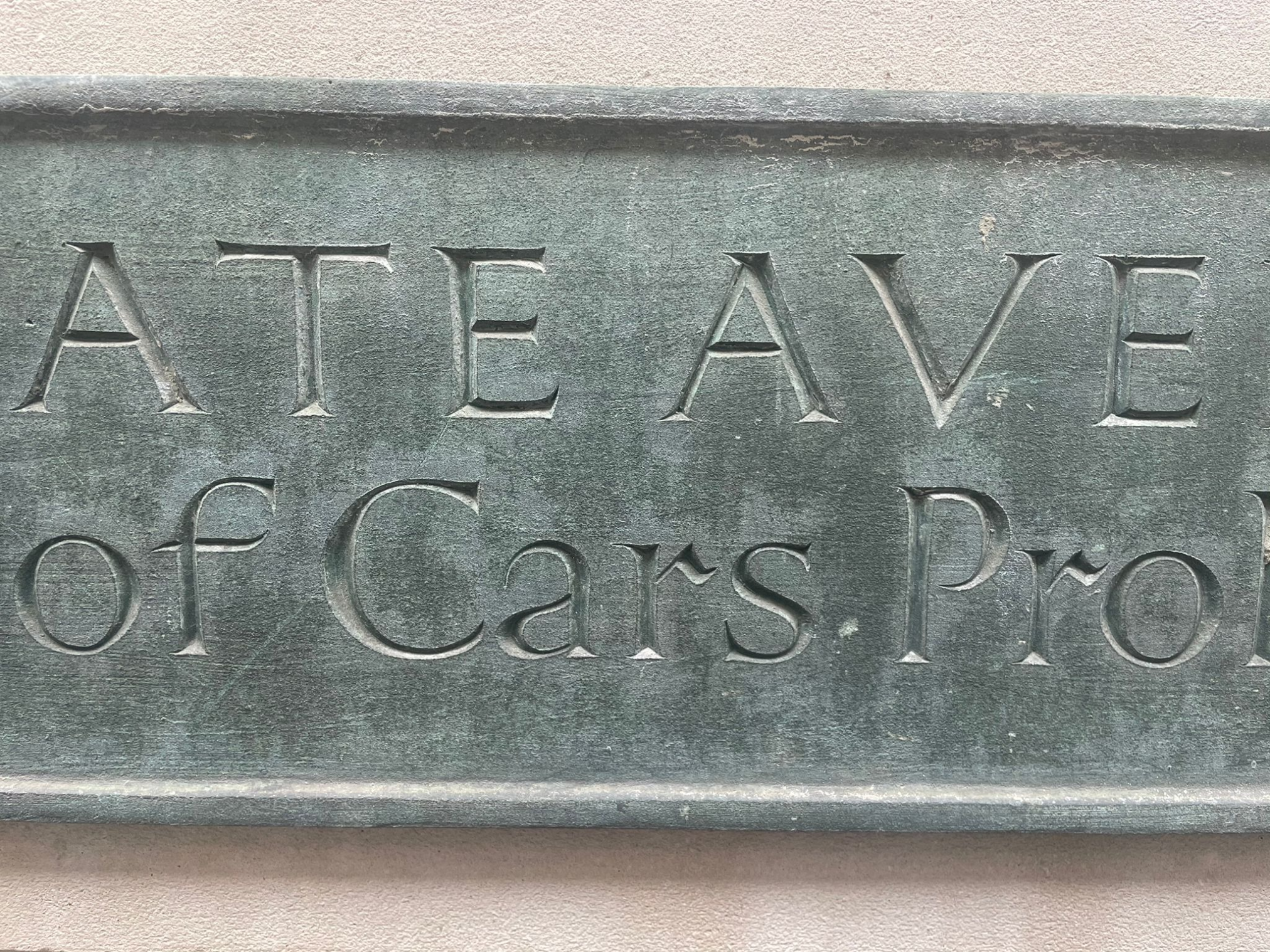
William Sharpington panel, Throgmorton Ave, London

Sharpington designed lettering art, such as memorials and hand painted signs himself, but generally drew out art work 'layouts' or 'patterns' for others, mainly stone masons, to cut into stone. He taught and had his workshop at the City and Guilds of London Art School and was made a Royal Academician in 1949, while also becoming a member of the Art Workers' Guild. His assistants and subcontractors included Kenneth Breese, Ron Burnett, Bob DuVivier and Donald Jackson (Note: Interviewed years later for an oral history project, Jackson commented that Sharpington tended to charge prices that were too low: "he just didn't have a feel for what it ought to be ... he realised that the best thing to do was to give me the job and I was to give him the cut so I would get straight to the client".) and his pupils included Michael Renton, Vera Ibbett and Stephen Lubell, whose article on him made with Burnett's assistance is one of the main sources on his life.

Sharpington was a Freemason in a lodge with Oliver, and later with Jackson. He died in 1973 and was commemorated with a plaque at St Bride's Church, a former client.

== Gallery ==
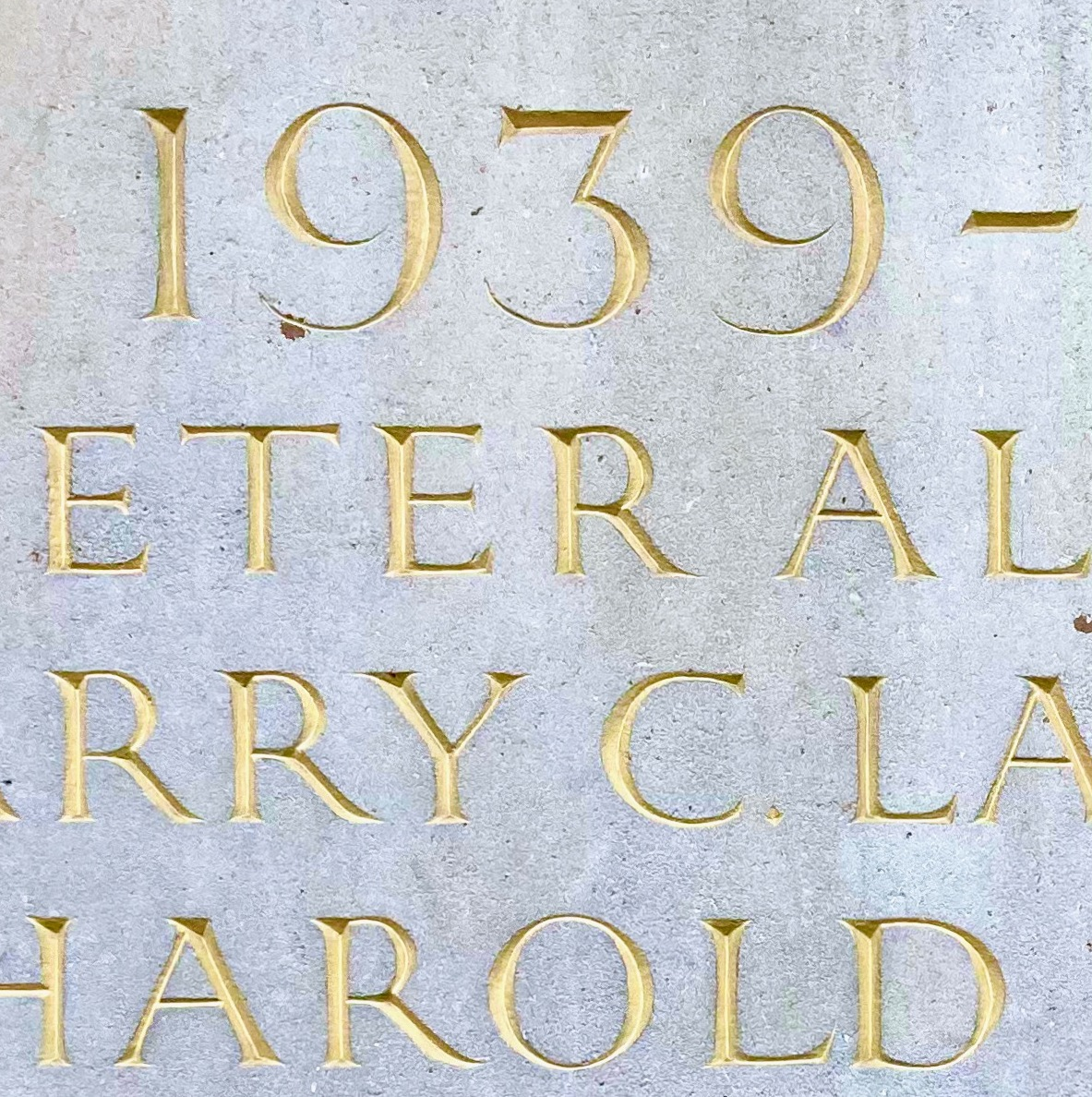
British Museum staff war memorial, Second World War section (detail)

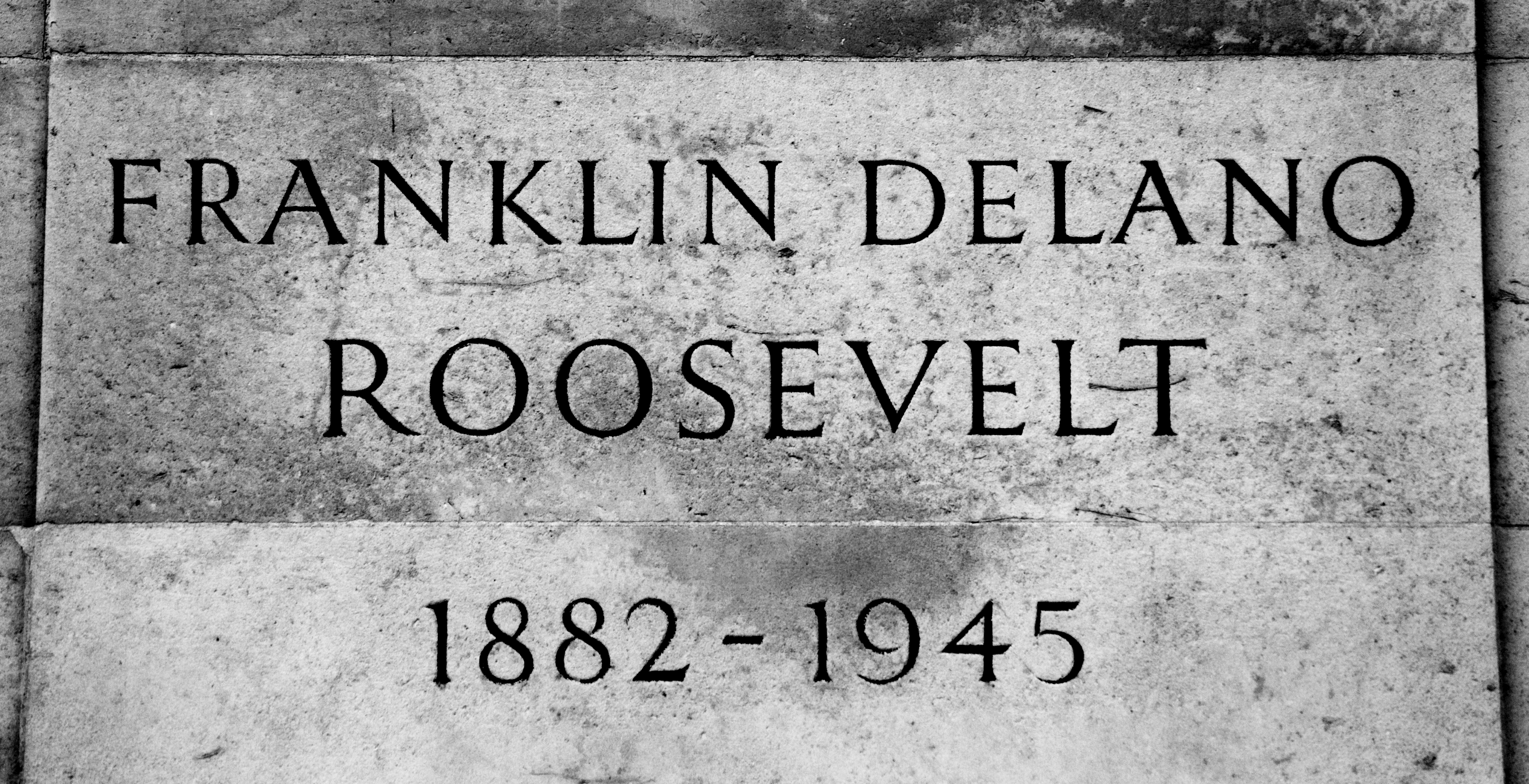
Lettering for the Roosevelt Memorial, London

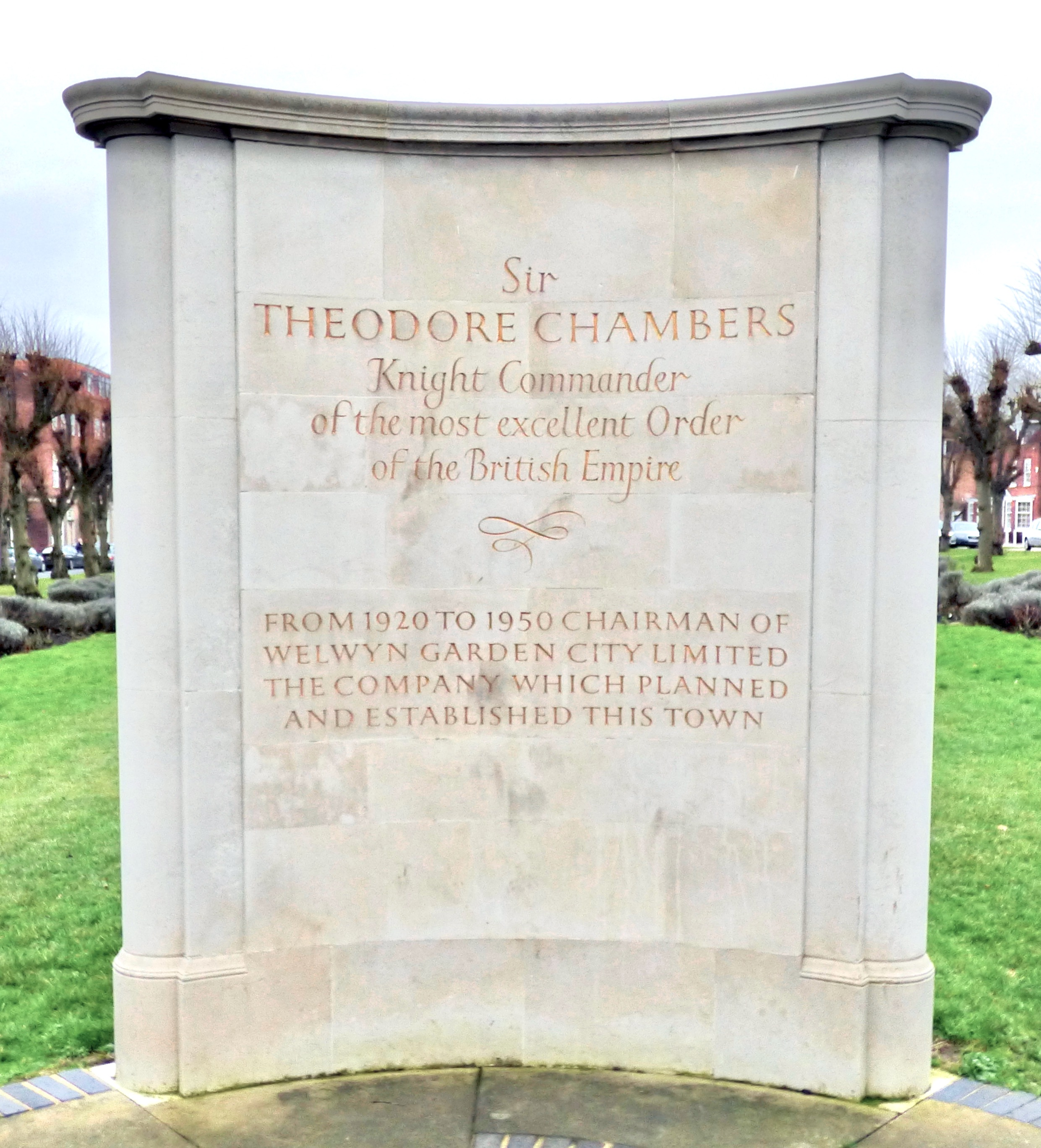
Memorial to Sir Theodore Chambers, Welwyn Garden City (monument designed by Louis de Soissons)

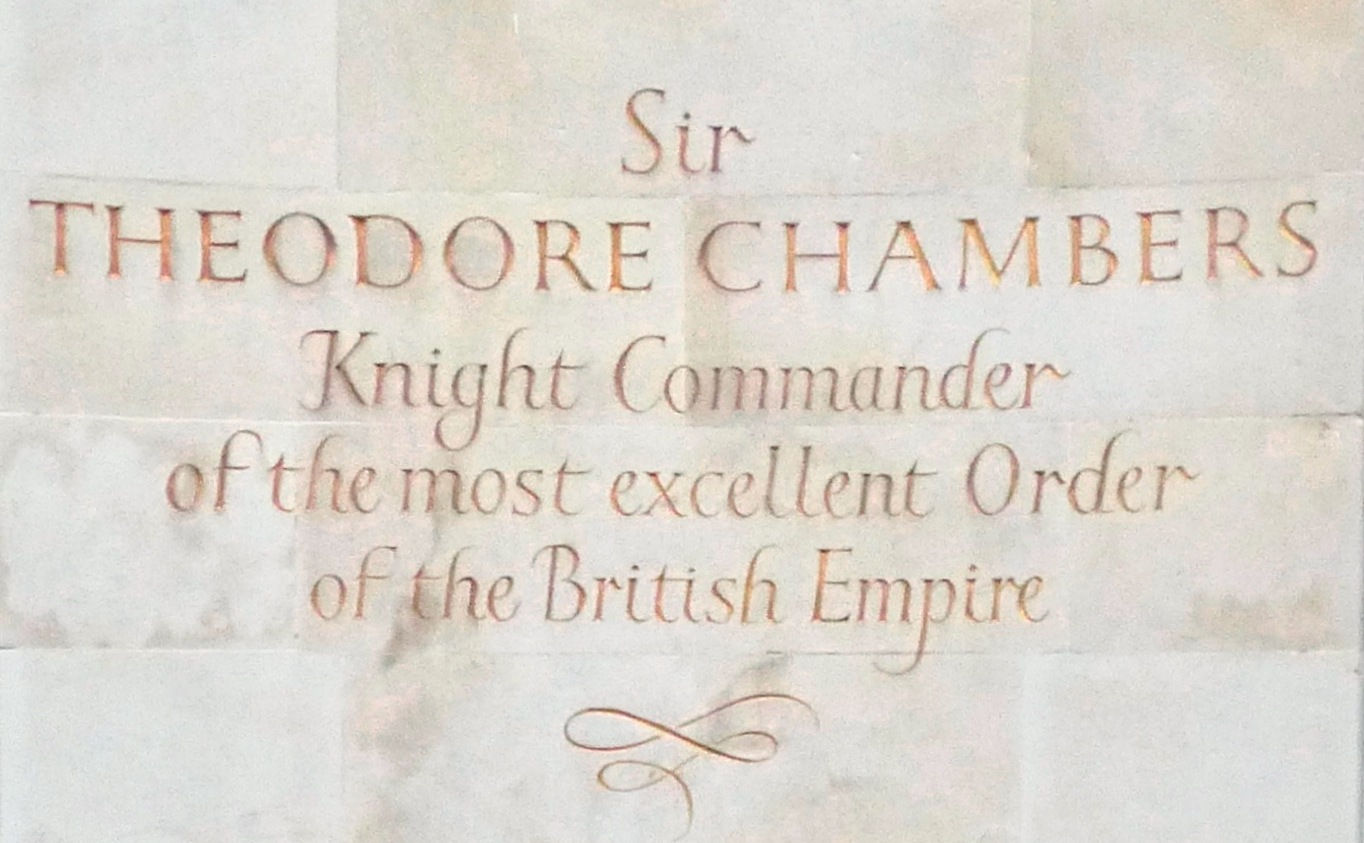
Chambers memorial (detail)

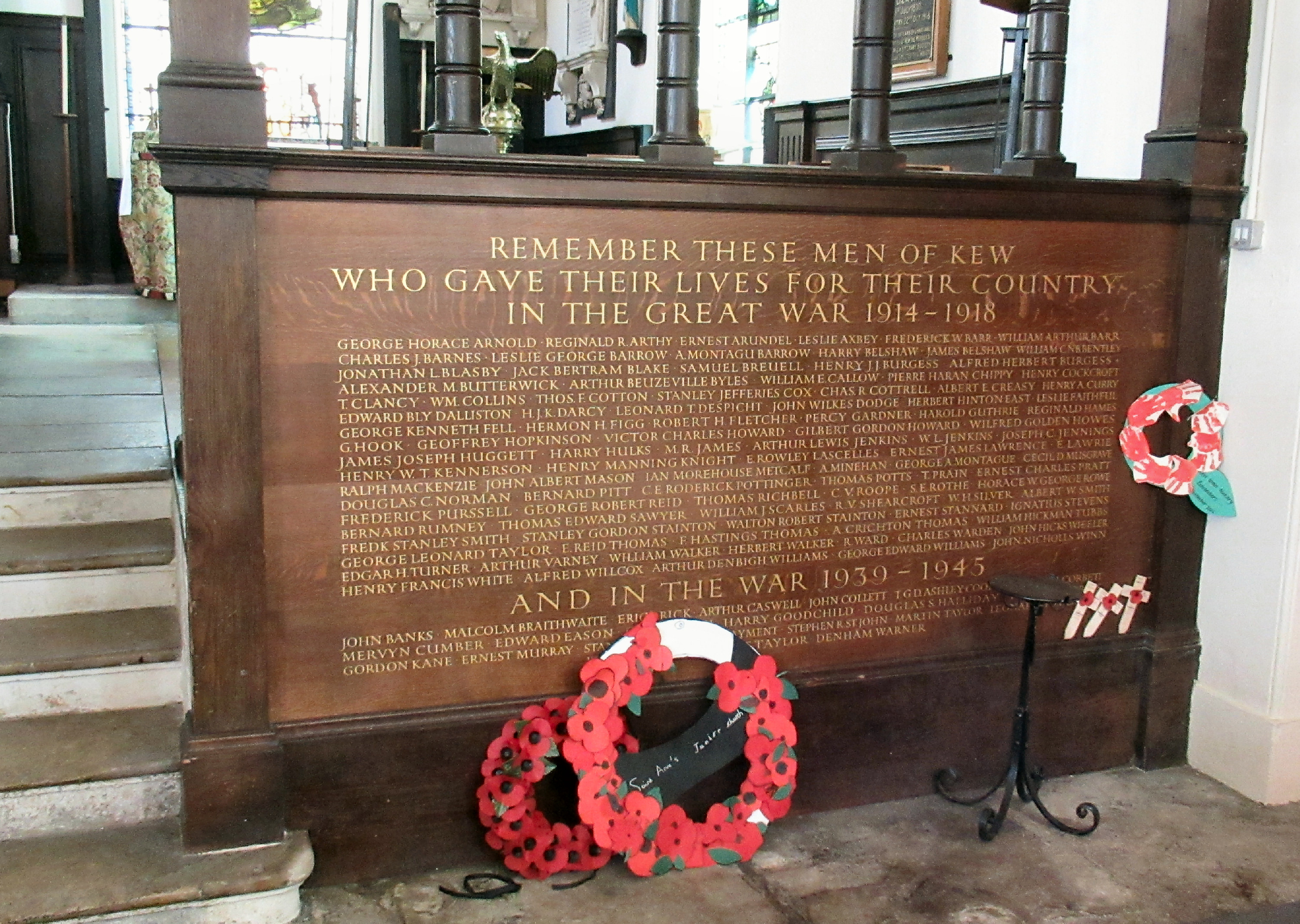
War memorial panel, St Anne's Church, Kew

== Legacy ==
Much of Sharpington's artwork was painted or made of wood and ephemeral, like signs for London County Council for schools and vaccination clinics (even as mundane as a "No Parking" sign to go at the entrance to a North London park). As a result, much of it no longer exists: by 1989 Dr. John Nash commented that "much of the beautiful work done by Sharpington's workshop during the Fifties is now gone". (Note: A signboard Lubell reproduces that Sharpington created for a toll road at Alleyn's College survives but the lettering has been replaced; it is not the same as in Burnett's photograph.) (Giving a memorial lecture to Delf Smith in 1946, M. C. Oliver commented that Sharpington "specializes in painted lettering of fine quality".) In addition, tastes changed and the practice of signwriting declined after his career, meaning his work was often not replaced with similar designs.

However, photographs exist of some of his lost work and other examples survive which were made of stone or kept indoors in protected locations such as government buildings and churches. The Diocese of Southwark archives list correspondence with him on various projects.

== Extant work ==
- London Scottish Regiment Chapel, St Columba's Church, London
- Memorial to John Collis Browne, Ramsgate, Kent (1973)
- British Museum, staff war memorial (1939–1945 section only; the First World War section is by Eric Gill)
- War memorial, interior of St Anne's Church, Kew (Note: Surrey County Council's website on the memorial credits Sharpington among other artists, but does not state which work he did. The memorial was dedicated in 1921, before Sharpington had set up his own practice, but rededicated in 1951 after the Second World War. According to Marian Mollett of the Richmond Local History Society the entire monument in its current form is his work as it was replaced in 1955.)
- Memorial to Sir Theodore Chambers, Parkway, Welwyn Garden City, monument designed by Louis de Soissons (c. 1961)
- Roosevelt Memorial, Grosvenor Square, lettering
- Plaque marking York Water Gate, Victoria Embankment Gardens
- A History of English Life (1936), book, lettering on maps and charts
- Memorial to Edith Somerville and Violet Florence Martin, Saint Barrahane's Church, Castletownshend, Ireland
