= Roman lettering =

Modern usage of Roman capitals

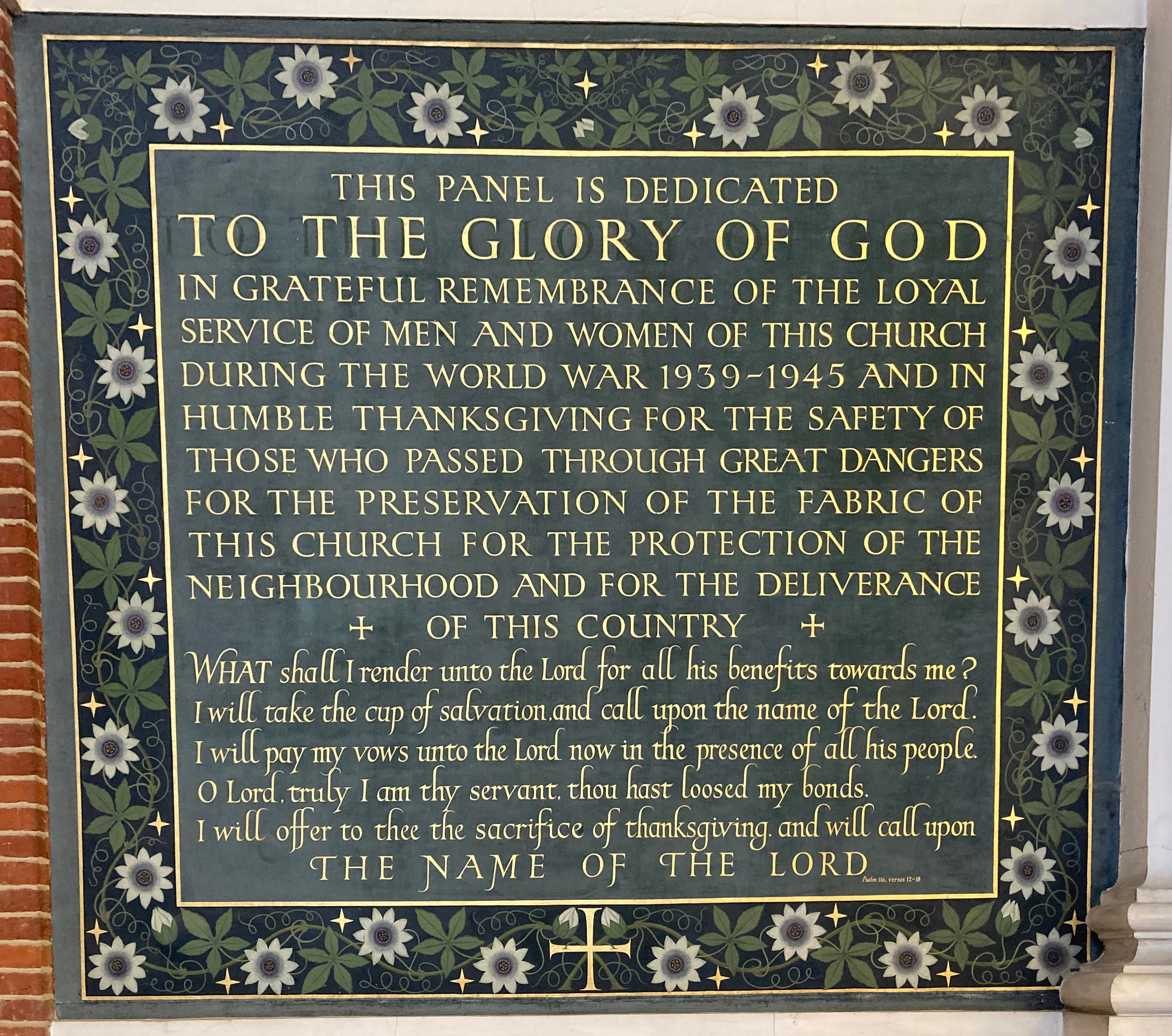
Lettering on a war memorial panel by Percy Delf Smith

Roman lettering or Trajan lettering (Note: "Trajan" was often used as a shorthand for the style of lettering, or at least the capitals, especially later on, see for example Nash, who says that "what was beginning to be called the 'Trajan letter' [became] a basic form to be taught to art schools", Nicolete Gray, who comments that "Trajan is now also a trade term" and "to avoid confusion, I shall refer to this letter as 'Trajan'". However, especially by those who introduced the style, the more accurate term "Roman lettering" or similar was used, for example by Johnston (Roman capitals), Evetts ("Roman Lettering"), Delf Smith, who called his workshop the Roman Lettering Company, and Lubell, who describes the style as "the revival of the classic Roman Inscriptional capitals in early twentieth century England" and "adherence to a Roman exemplar", although this can be confused with Roman capitals in general or with Roman type. Nash describes it as the "Johnston-Gill tradition".) refers to the use by artists and signwriters of Roman square capitals in modern lettering, particularly in Britain.

Around the early twentieth century, British artists in the Arts and Crafts movement led by Edward Johnston came to see the proportions of Roman square capitals as an attractive, timeless form of letters, the ideal for artistic use. Artists who worked in this style included Johnston's pupils Eric Gill, Graily Hewitt, Percy Delf Smith (Note: Percy Delf Smith was born Percy John Smith, taking his wife's surname of Delf after his marriage. For consistency, this article refers to him as Delf Smith throughout.) and MacDonald Gill, as well as Reynolds Stone and many other professional signwriters and letter engravers. Roman capitals were used along with lower case, Arabic numerals, italics and calligraphy in a complementary style.

The style has been used for lettering where a feeling of timelessness was wanted, for example on First World War memorials and government buildings, but also on shopfronts, posters, maps, and other general uses. The popular name "Trajan" for this style of lettering came from the lettering on the base of the Trajan Column, copies of which were often used (in theory, at least) as models by lettering artists. Phil Baines commented that it became "Britain's standard style of official lettering".

== Use ==
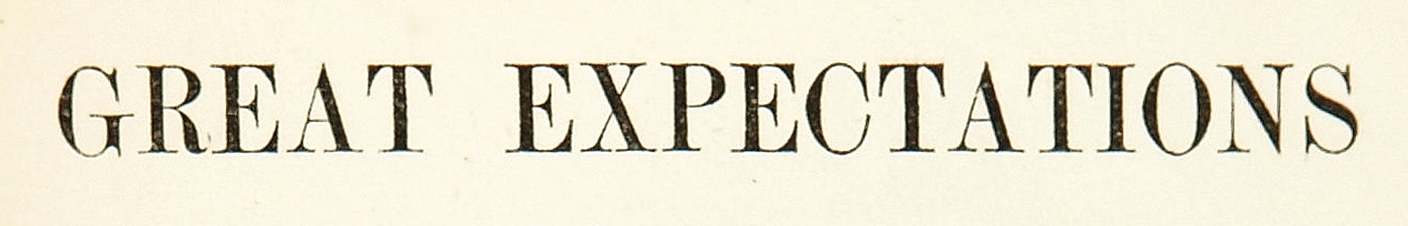
Nineteenth-century Didone serif types tended to use sharp serifs, with capitals of near identical width.

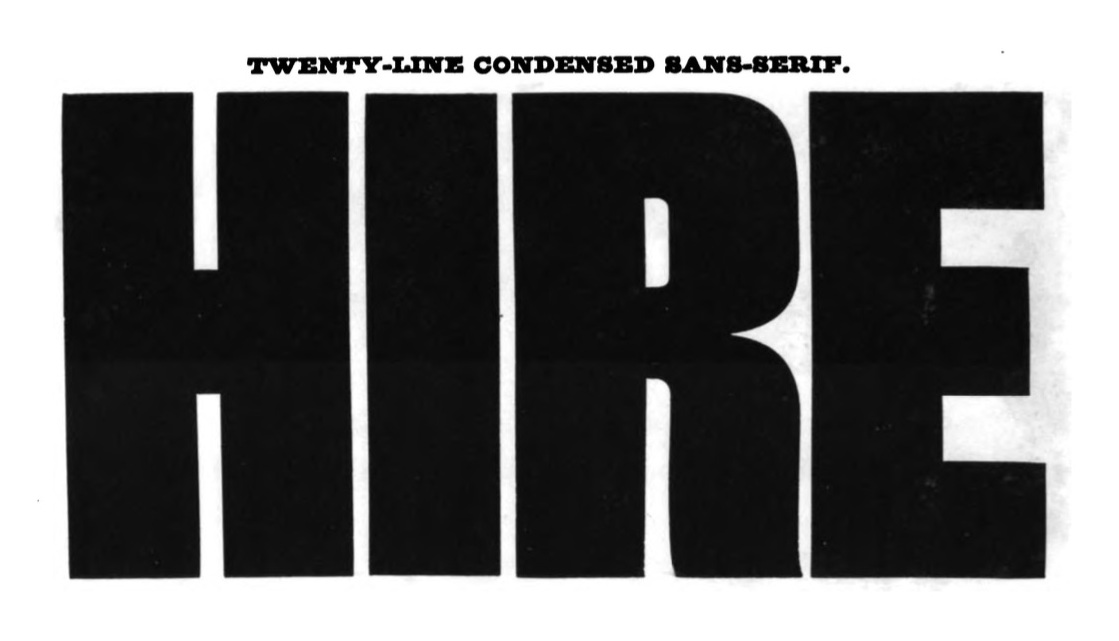
The gloomy, ultra-bold sans-serifs of the Figgins foundry. Arts and Crafts movement artists saw the style as ugly and excessive. Below: lettering model by Eric Gill

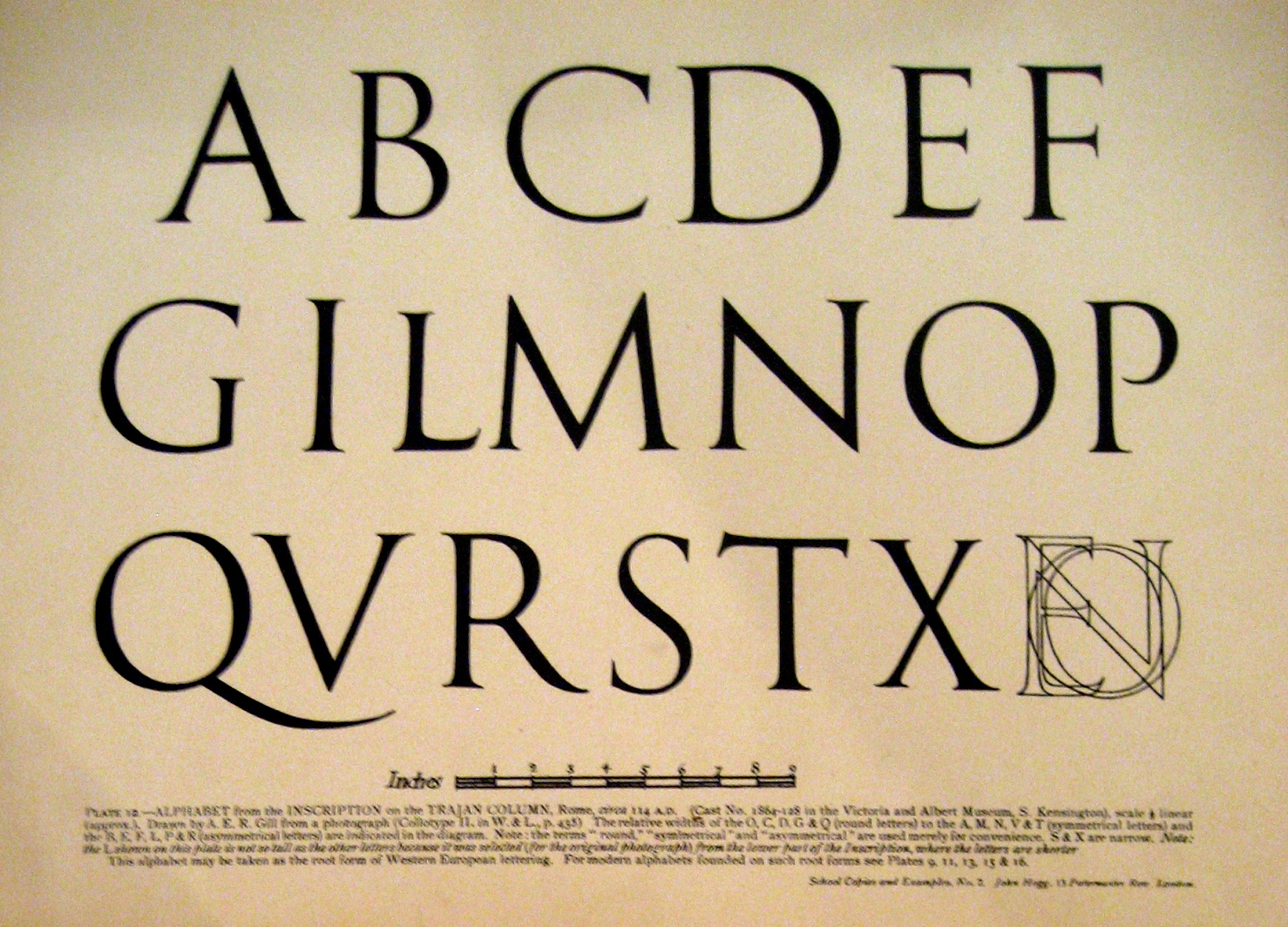

The main source studying the history of Trajan lettering in Britain is Professor James Mosley's 1964 article Trajan Revived; and research by Dr. John Nash and biographers of individual artists.

Roman capitals were one of the main forms of lettering of the ancient world. During the Renaissance, there was considerable interest in Roman capitals, with typefaces based on them. However, in the eighteenth and nineteenth century types and lettering in the Didone or modern serif style tended to a style with sharp contrast in stroke width and capital letters of near equal width, the opposite of the Roman capital model where capitals had widely varying width. These proportions were copied into display typefaces and lettering of the time, like fat faces and sans-serifs.

=== Johnston and his pupils ===
Roman capitals on the base of Trajan's Column in Rome

The use of Roman capitals in lettering grew out of the Arts and Crafts movement, which promoted individual craftsmanship and traditional styles of art with respect for the past. (Note: Categorising the artists who worked in the Roman lettering style as Arts and Crafts movement is of course a simplification, as they came later than early figures in that trend such as William Morris who were very interested in medieval art: Nash comments that "Gill, who spent much of his life scorning that very movement and considered himself nothing if not forward-looking, would have been most irritated.")

On 11 April 1898, the architect and historian William Lethaby offered Edward Johnston a job teaching illuminating and calligraphy at the Central School of Arts and Crafts in London, and Johnston began to teach classes on 21 September 1899. Lethaby was keen to increase students' interest in the aesthetic value of letters. (Note: Lethaby had written in an education report shortly before meeting Johnston for the first time that students' lettering was "almost without exception bad. Such students as endeavour to apply lettering harmoniously to their designs seem to endeavour to invent new and contorted forms out of their heads." Johnston was offered the job on 11 April 1898, but because of Johnston's lack of confidence and difficulties in starting the class it began the following year.) Johnston rapidly built up a school of pupils very impressed with his work. (Note: Johnston's teaching notes have survived: pupils present on 21 September included Noel Rooke and Florence Kingsford Cockerell, with T. J. Cobden-Sanderson, Graily Hewitt and Percy Delf Smith taking classes with him from 1900 and Eric Gill from 1901.)

According to M. C. Oliver, Lethaby introduced the Trajan's Column inscription to Johnston (Note: The Trajan Column inscription was accessible in London because of a cast in the Victoria and Albert Museum, which had been presented by Napoleon III. In Mosley's view, it became a model as the "sole antique inscription of which casts were readily available" in London.) and as professor of design at the Royal College of Art put casts of the inscription of Trajan's Column as a standard for students to follow. (Note: Mosley notes that this was the recollection of Oliver, but cautioned that another pupil at the Central School, A. H. Verstage, "never heard Lethaby refer to the Trajan inscription".) (At the time it was normal to use custom lettering for signs because of the inflexibility of printing and reproducing large fonts before the arrival of computer font technologies. (Note: For example plotters, wide-format printers and CNC machining.))

=== Mass use ===
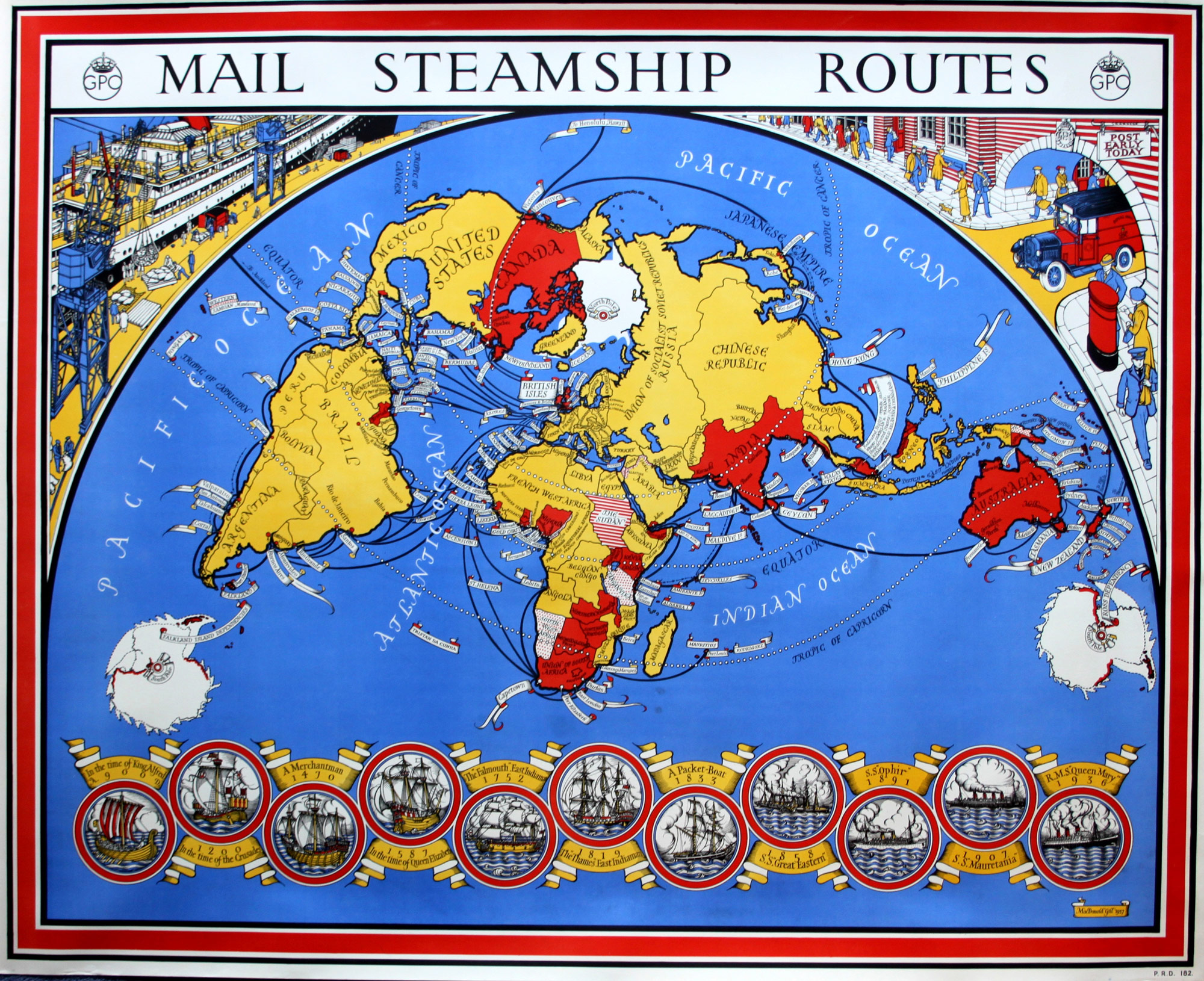
Map by MacDonald Gill, using Roman capitals at the top

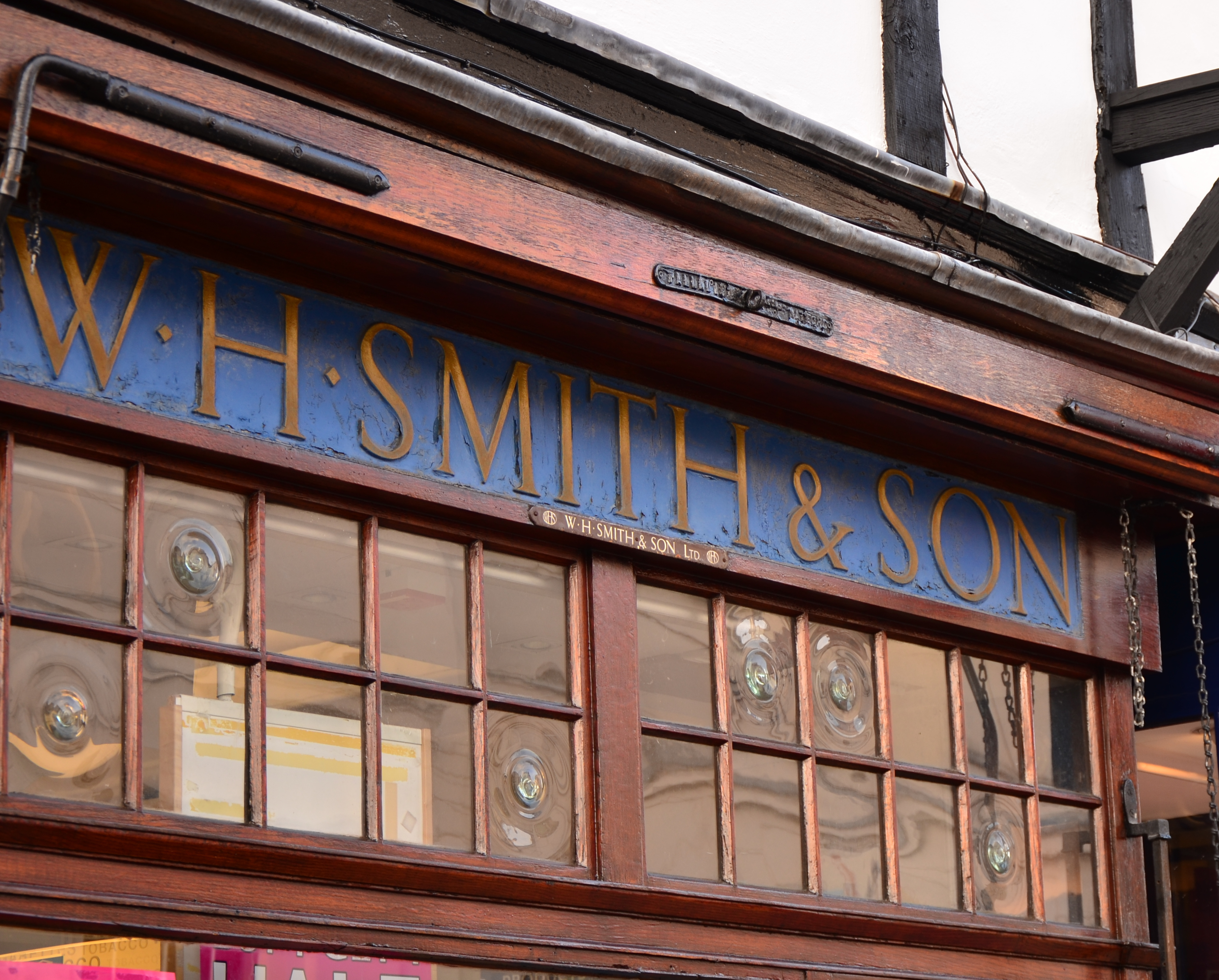
W. H. Smith store, St. Albans

In his 1906 textbook Writing and Illuminating and Lettering, Johnston commented "the Roman Capitals have held the supreme place among letters for readableness and beauty. They are the best forms for the grandest and most important inscriptions" and more pithily "when in doubt, use Roman Capitals." Lettering based on Roman capitals rapidly began to appear in many design manuals as a model. Nicolete Gray commented that in the early twentieth century "it was taught in all art schools".

Johnston himself generally did not do monumental and inscription design: he tended to prefer calligraphy and many of his commissions were creating documents, like charters, ornamental record books and certificates. However, his pupils such as Eric Gill and Percy Delf Smith rapidly secured commissions creating lettering in the Roman capital style that were widely seen, for example Gill created standard lettering for W. H. Smith used on their storefronts from about 1904.

The lettering used by British artists did not always follow the Trajan capital model, often adding changes such as serifs on the top of the 'M' and 'N', and of course the lower case, Arabic numerals and italics which the Romans did not have. (Note: Gill commented that "while we may remember Trajan lovingly in the museum, we must forget all about him in the workshop." and that art schools were dominated by "Trajan snobbery".) Phil Baines commented in 2007 that "it is difficult for us now to realise how fresh the Trajan letter–with its light colour and capitals of varying width–must have appeared at that time...it swept [other designs] away and became the norm within a very short space of time."

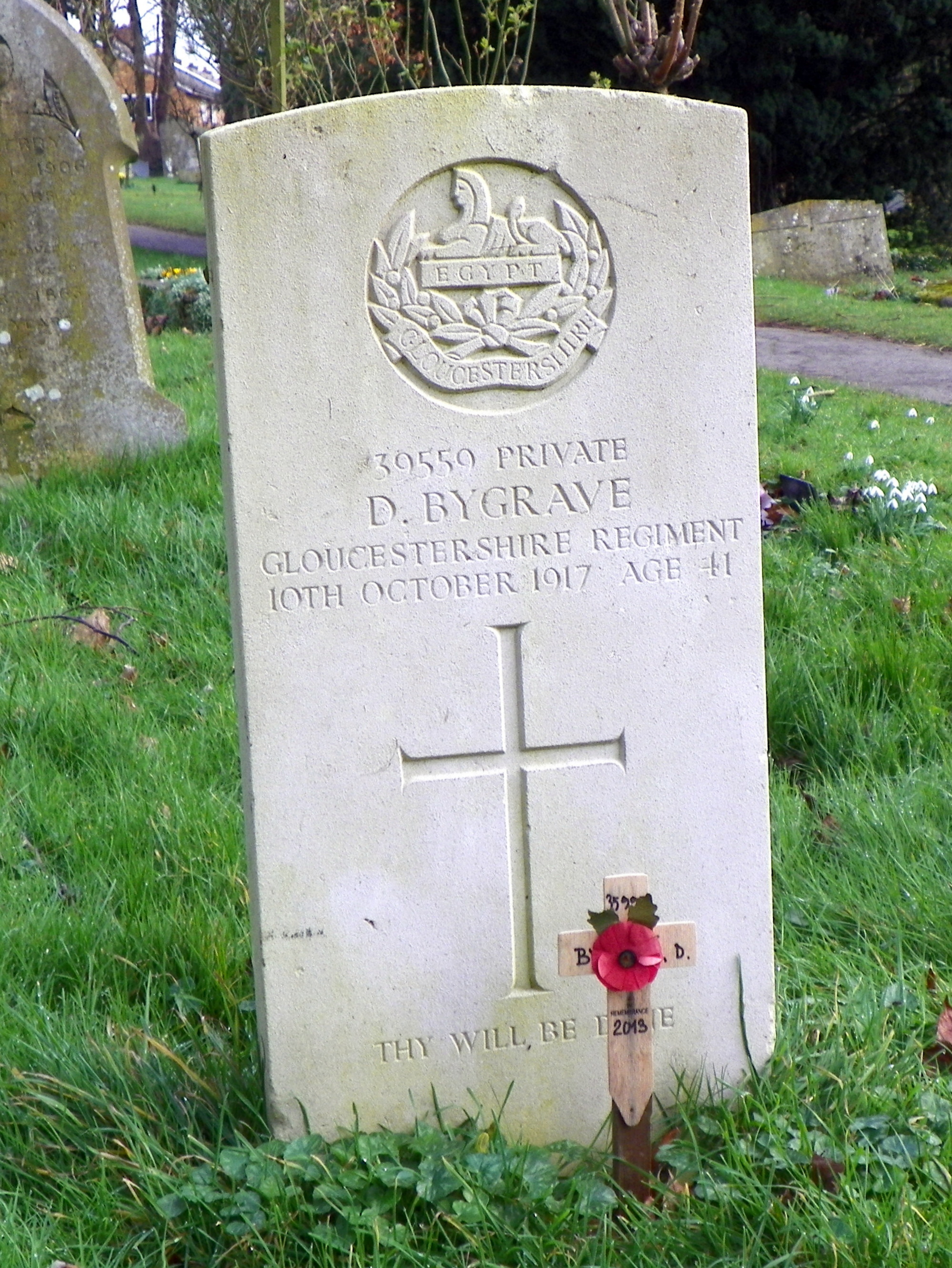
Standard lettering designed by MacDonald Gill on a war grave

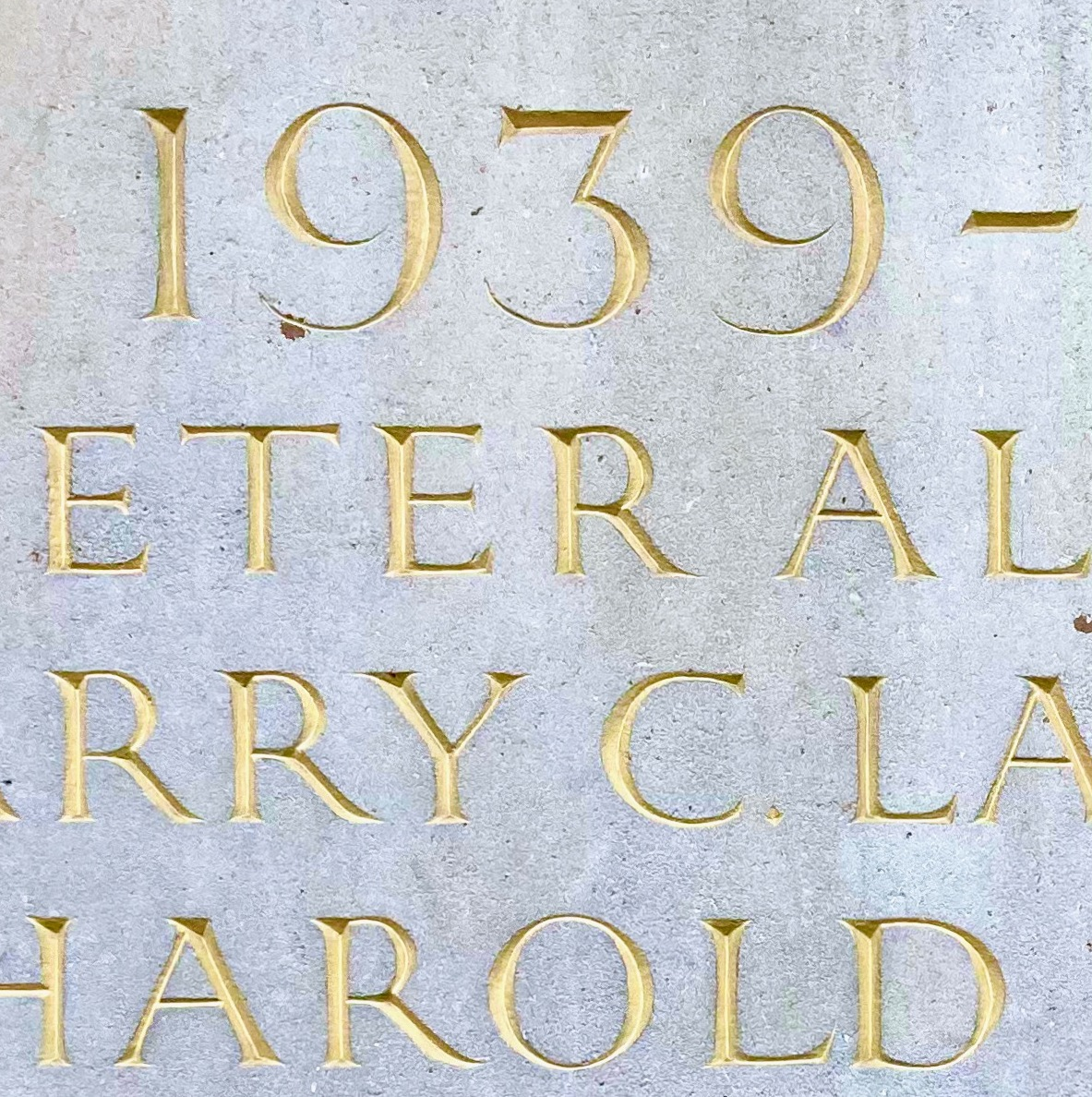
British Museum staff war memorial, Second World War section by William Sharpington (detail)

A reason for this codification to come soon after was the First World War, where savage loss of life led to the creation of many monuments and memorials. The job of designing a standard alphabet for the war grave headstones for military casualties went to Johnston pupil MacDonald "Max" Gill, and he designed an alphabet in the Roman style. (Note: Max Gill was Eric Gill's brother, and later married Johnston's daughter, although the commission may have came from past work he had done for prominent architect Edwin Lutyens, who designed many First World War memorials.) Many of the collective monuments erected by British communities to First World War and later Second World War casualties also used Roman lettering, often designed by Johnston's pupils or people they had taught or worked with. The style was used very widely, however; Nash comments that "the English tradition in lettering and typography...owed a great deal to its charismatic pioneers, such as Lethaby, Johnston, Gill and [Stanley] Morison. However its strength lay in the army of unsung craftsmen and women who absorbed their ideas". (Note: Nash has highlighted as a later illustration of the diversity of the style Modern Lettering and Calligraphy (1954), which shows lettering work by a huge range of artists such as William Sharpington, many little-known.) (Note: Not everyone was impressed by the academic training of British lettering around this time. When graphic designer Becky Astbury interviewed her father George Astbury, a successful Liverpool signwriter who began his career in 1957, he commented "I was asked in the past 'are you going to night school?' and my answer was 'what the bleeding hell for'...[you'd get] taught how to create serifs with a compass. It's best to judge it by eye and get it done quickly.")

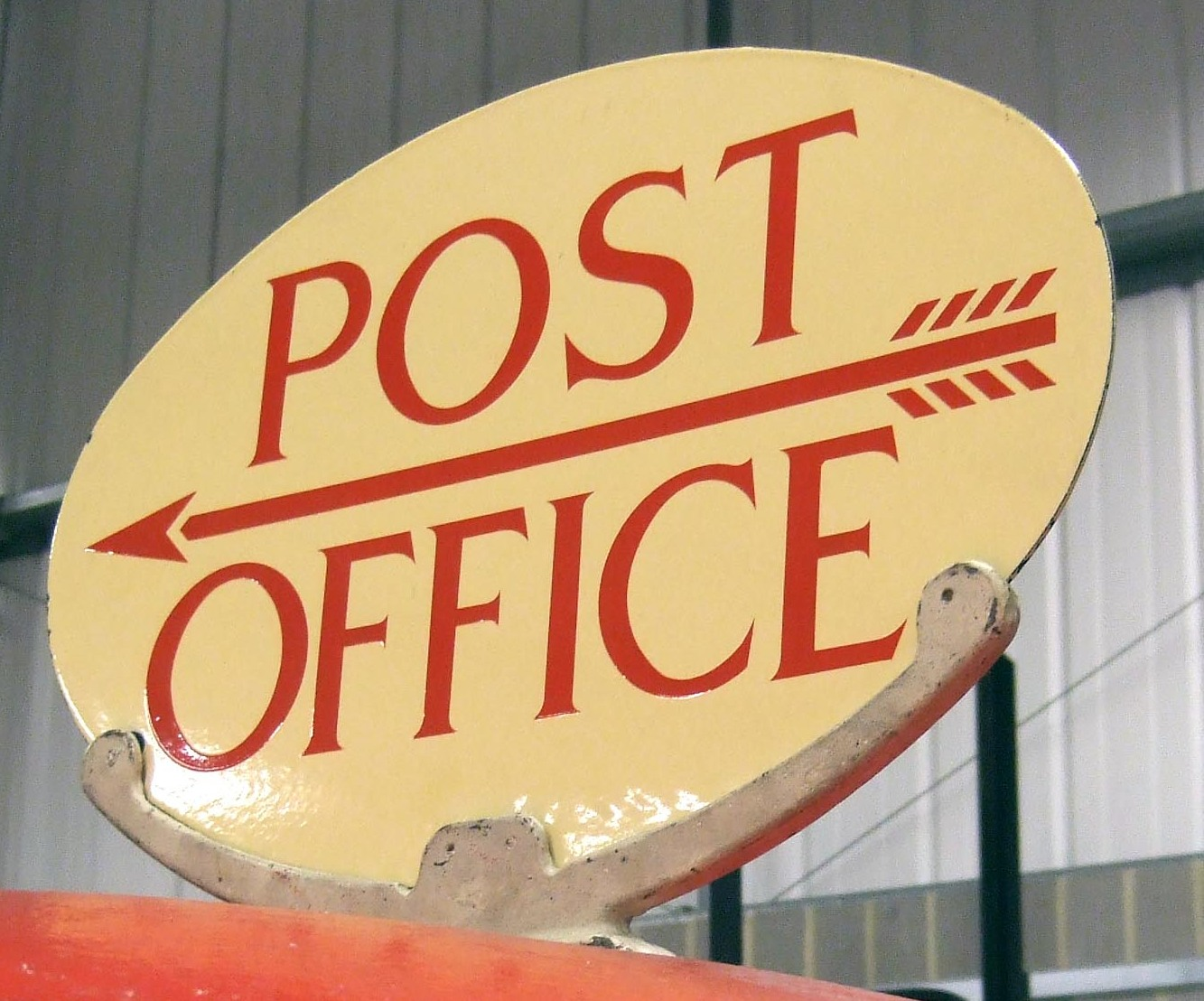
Post Office sign

Roman-style lettering also became used for major institutions such as the Post Office, and (later) by the Ministry of Works, on many British street signs, using a design by David Kindersley, and on London blue plaques.

== Gallery ==
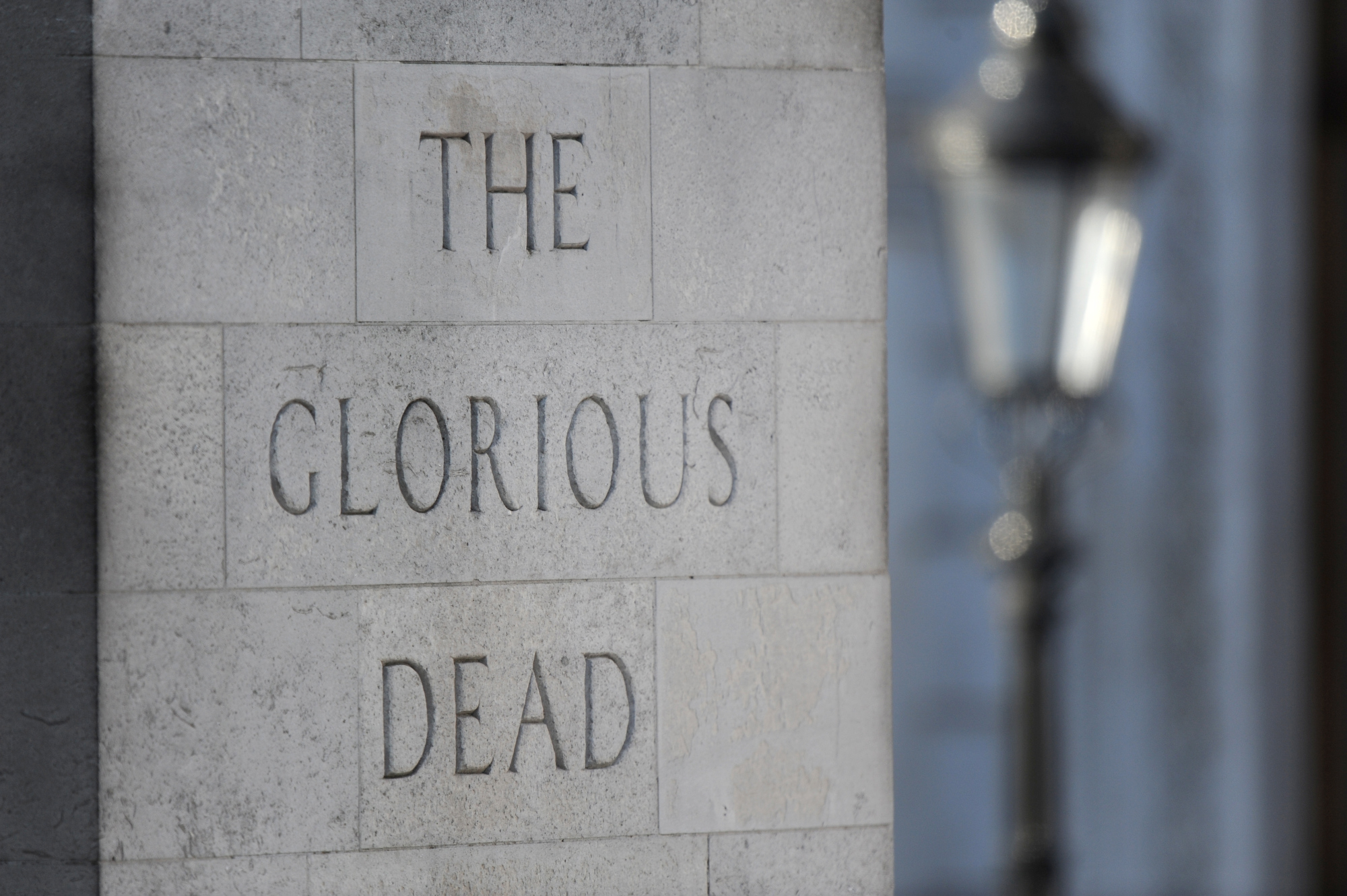
Inscription, The Cenotaph, London

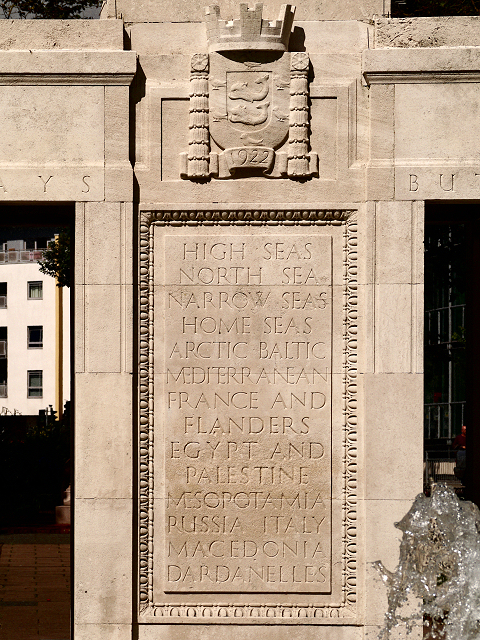
War Memorial, Brighton

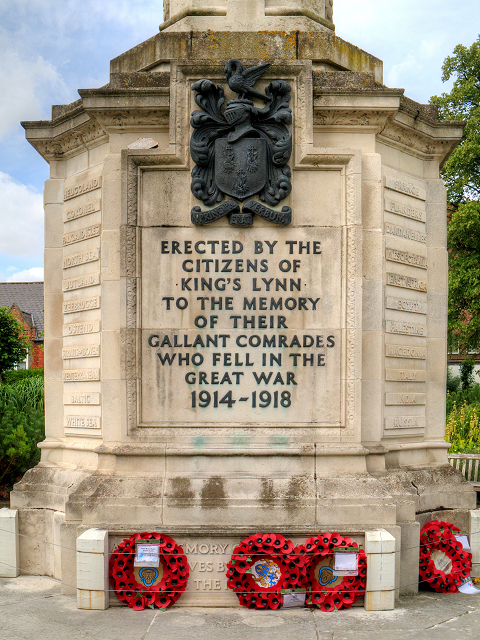
War Memorial, King's Lynn

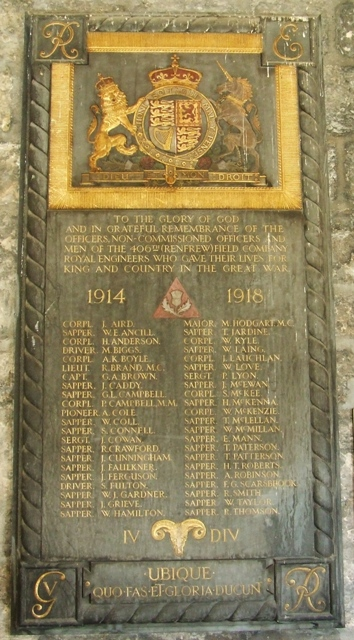
Royal Engineers memorial, Paisley Abbey

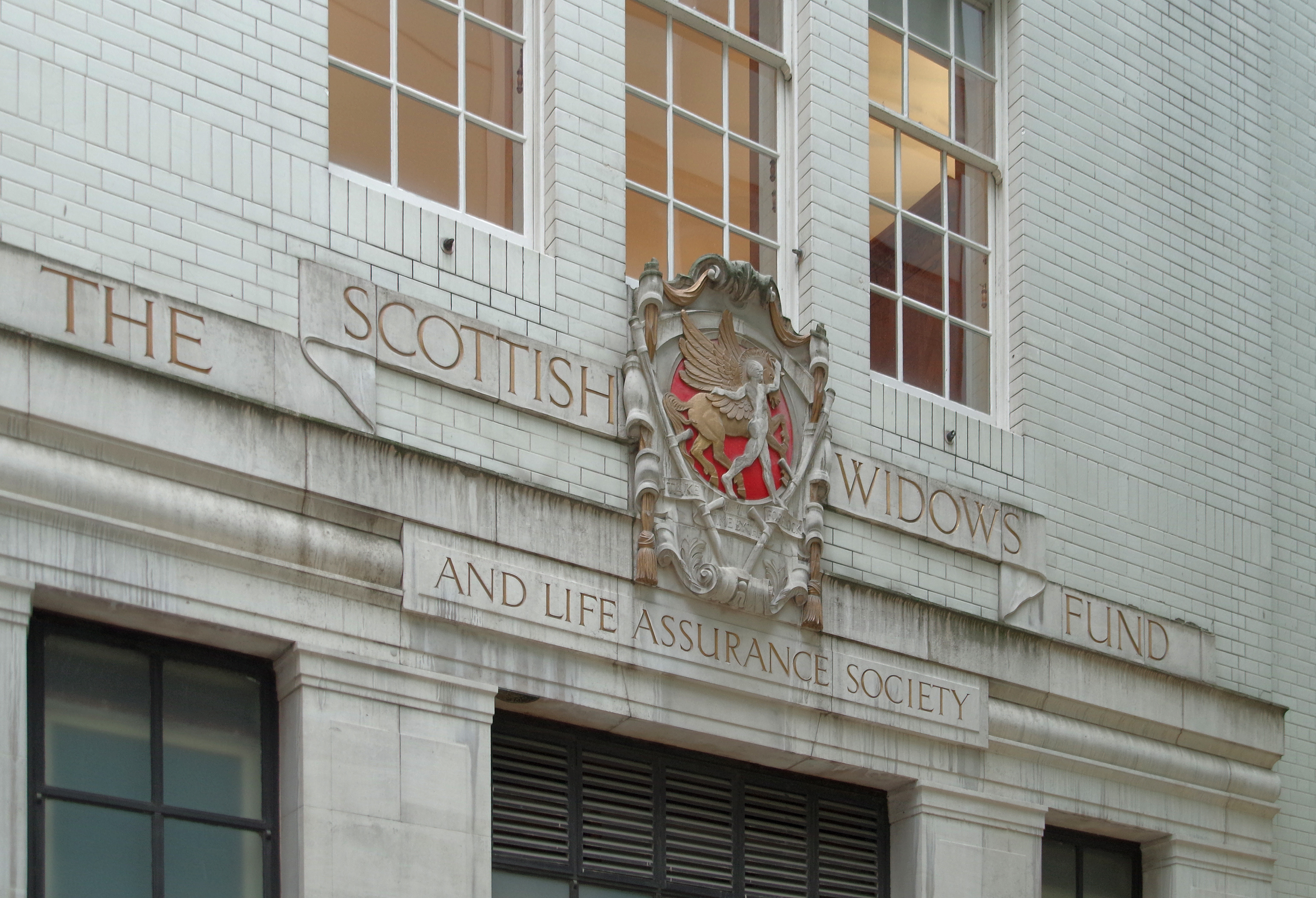
Scottish Widows mutual fund office, London

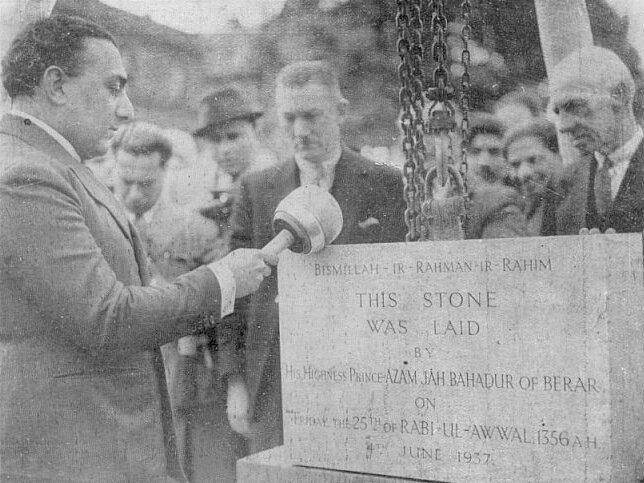
Foundation stone of London Central Mosque, 1937

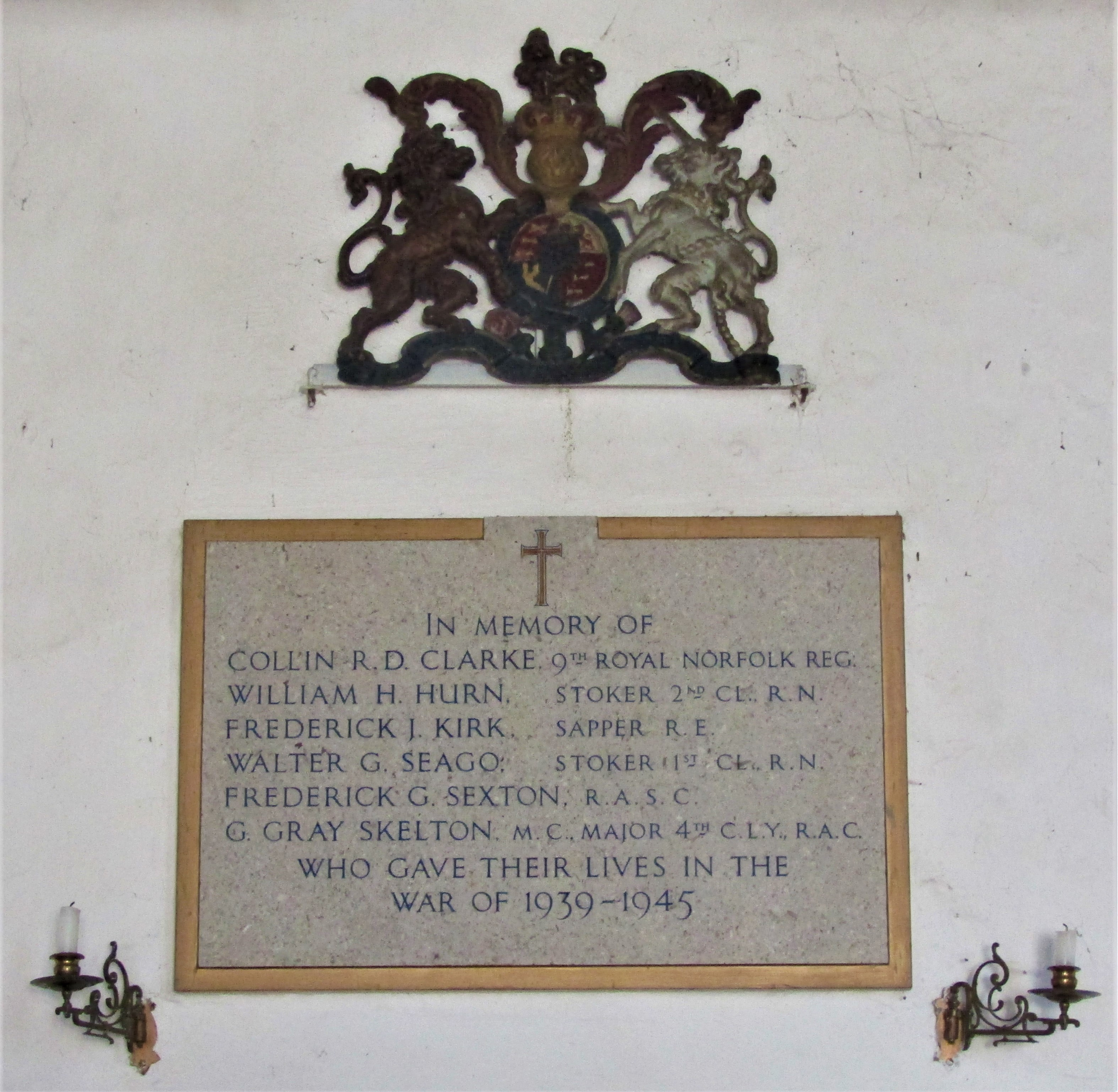
Plaque, Gimingham, Norfolk

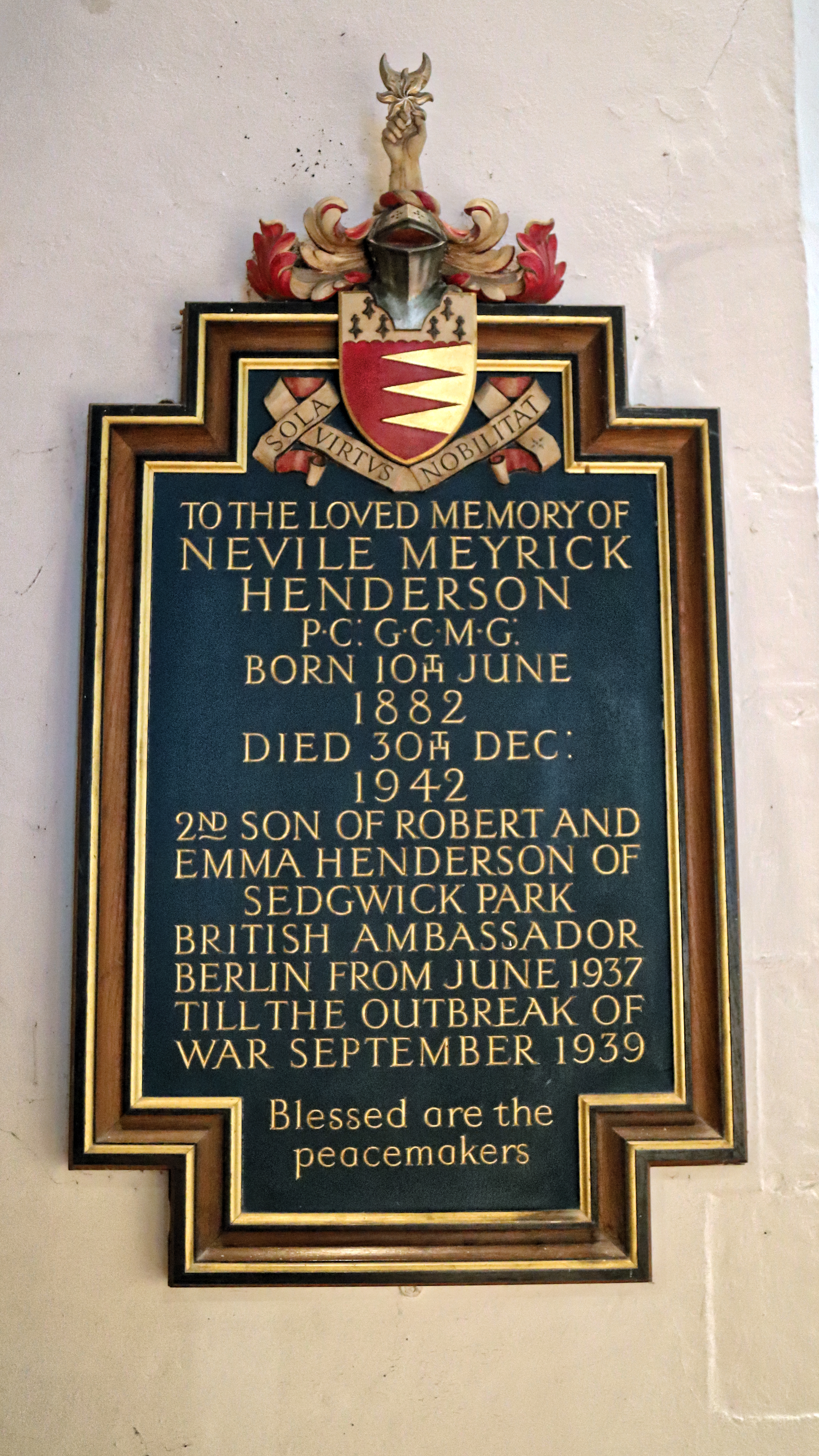
Memorial to Nevile Henderson

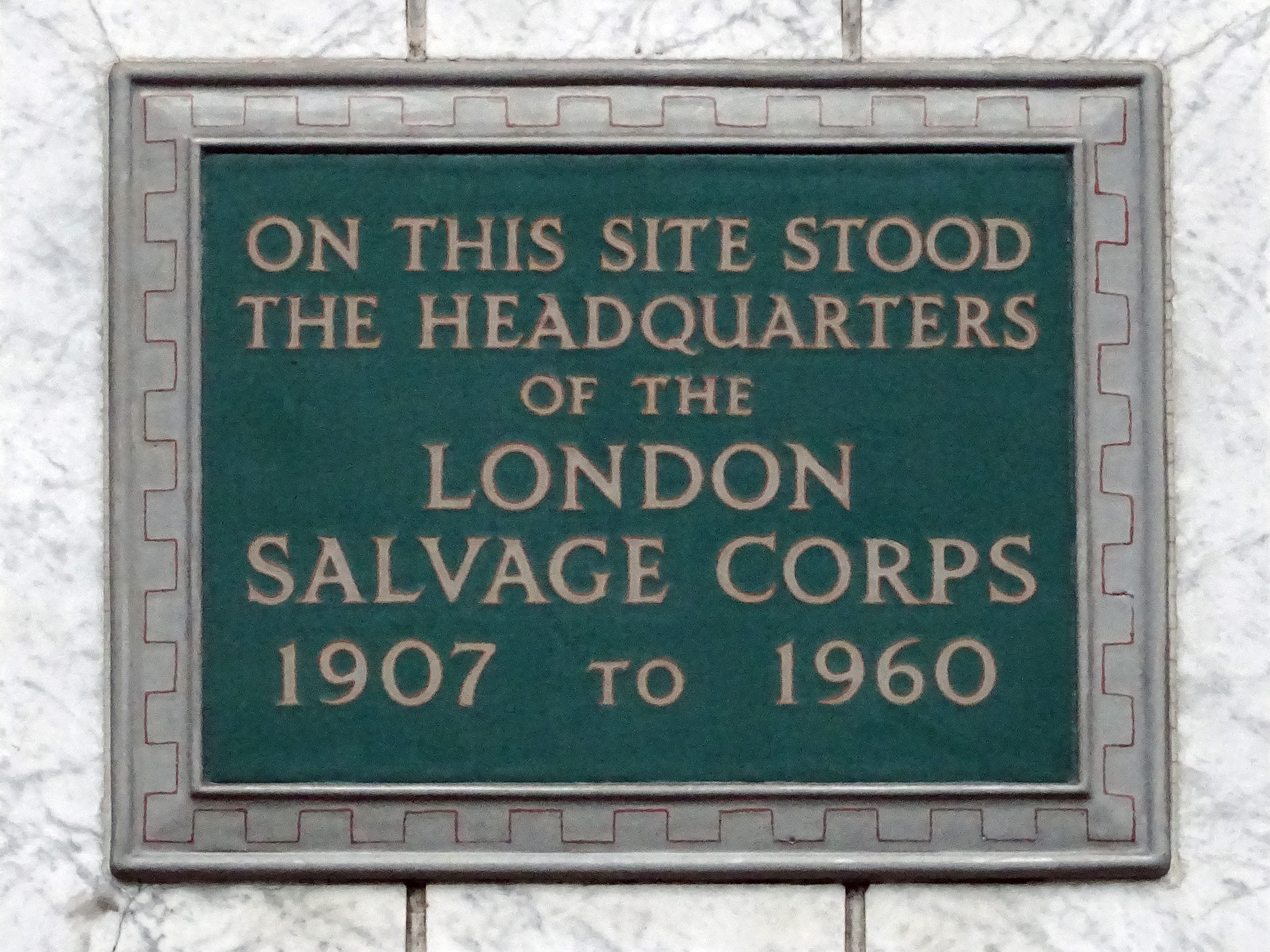
Ceramic plaque, London

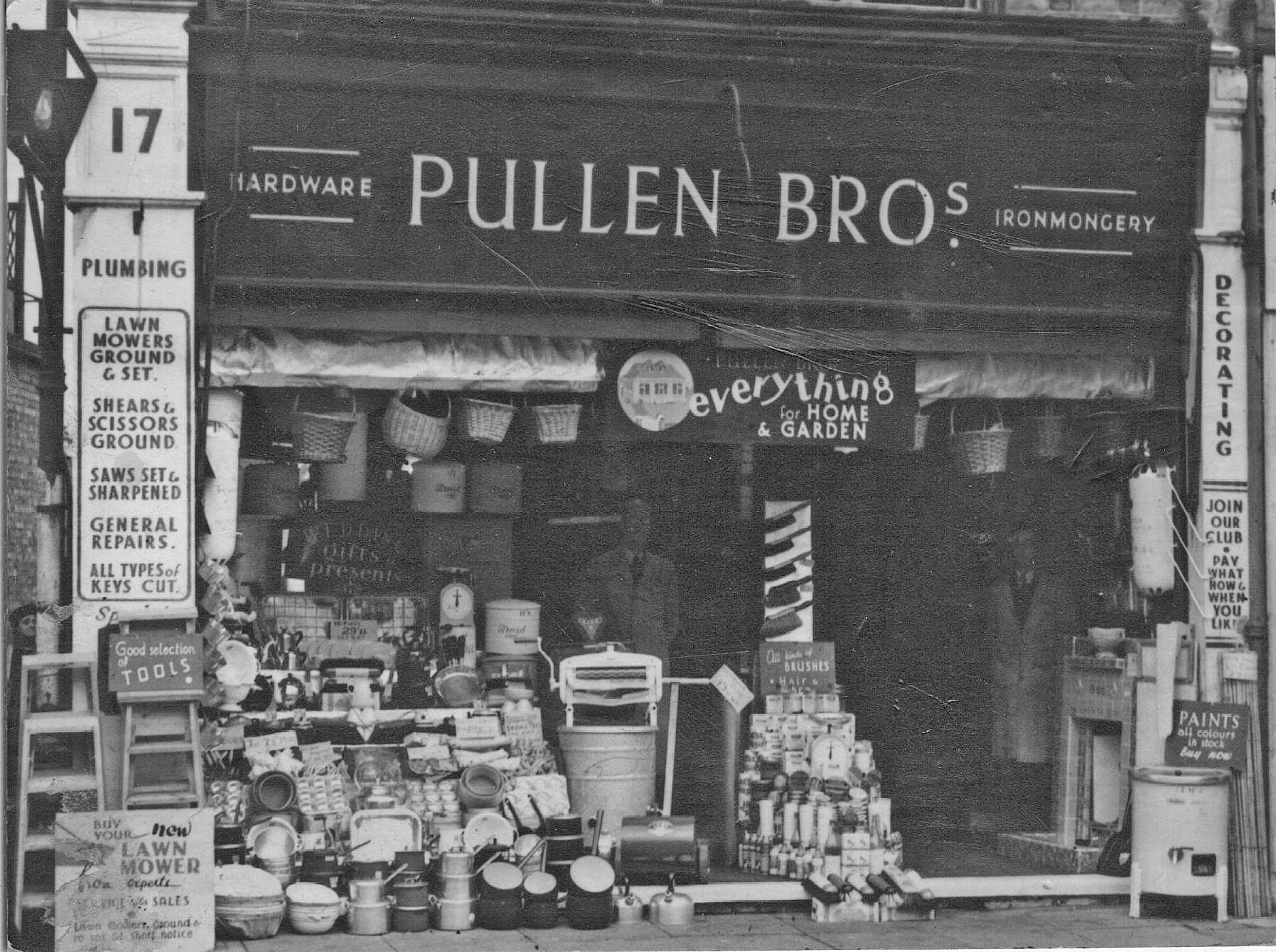
Pullen Bros shop, London

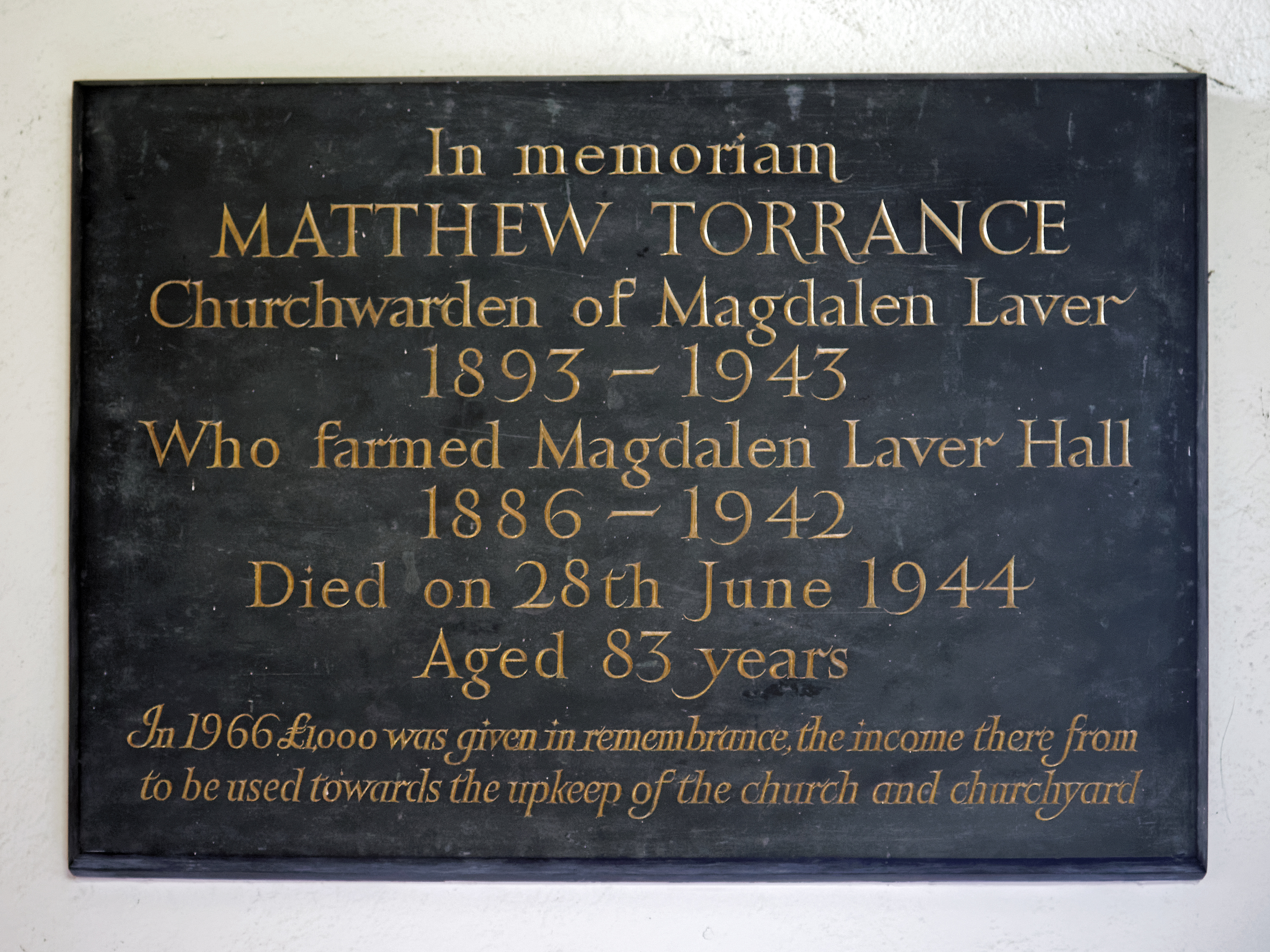
Memorial to Matthew Torrance, Magdalen Laver

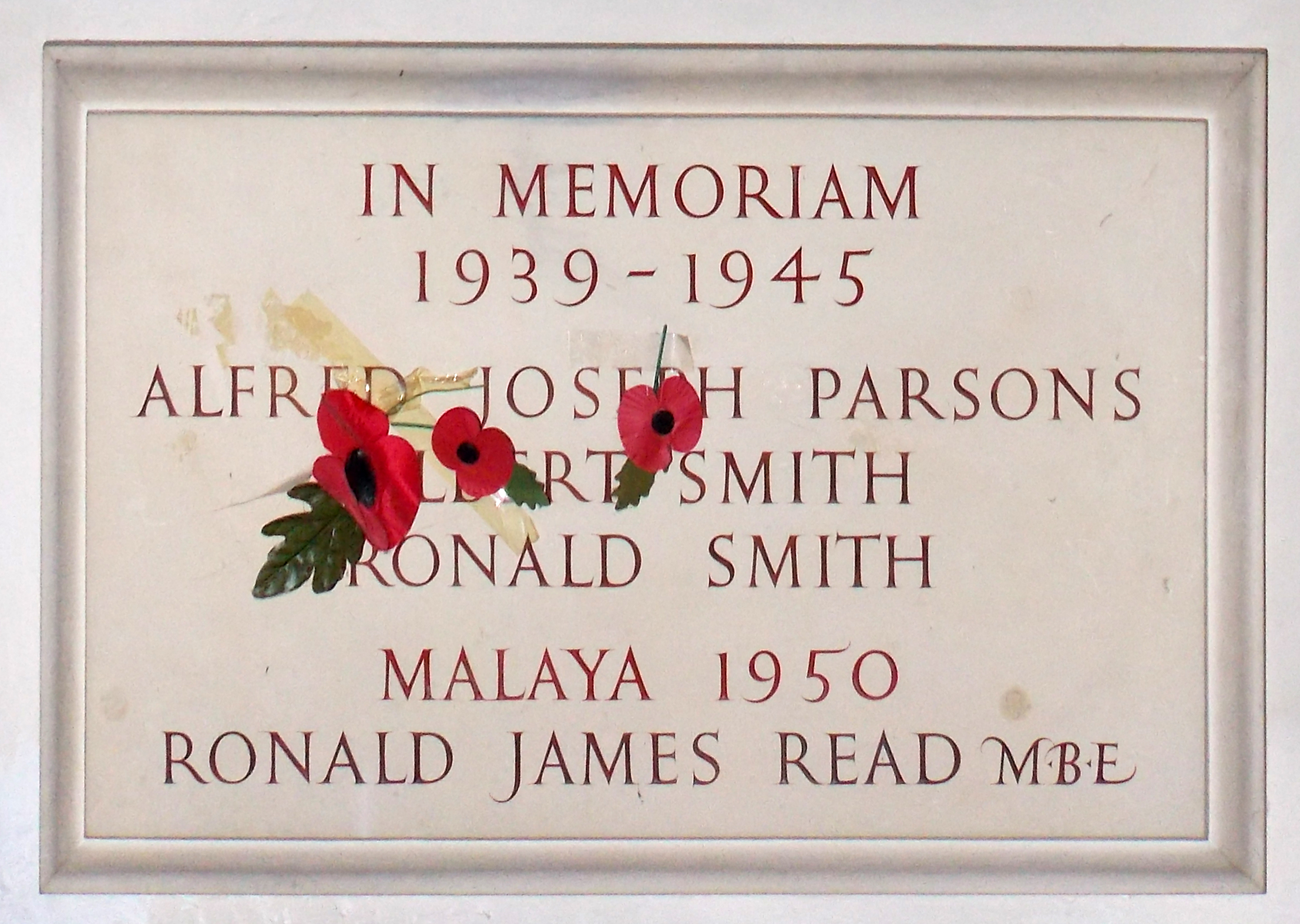
Second World War memorial, Farley

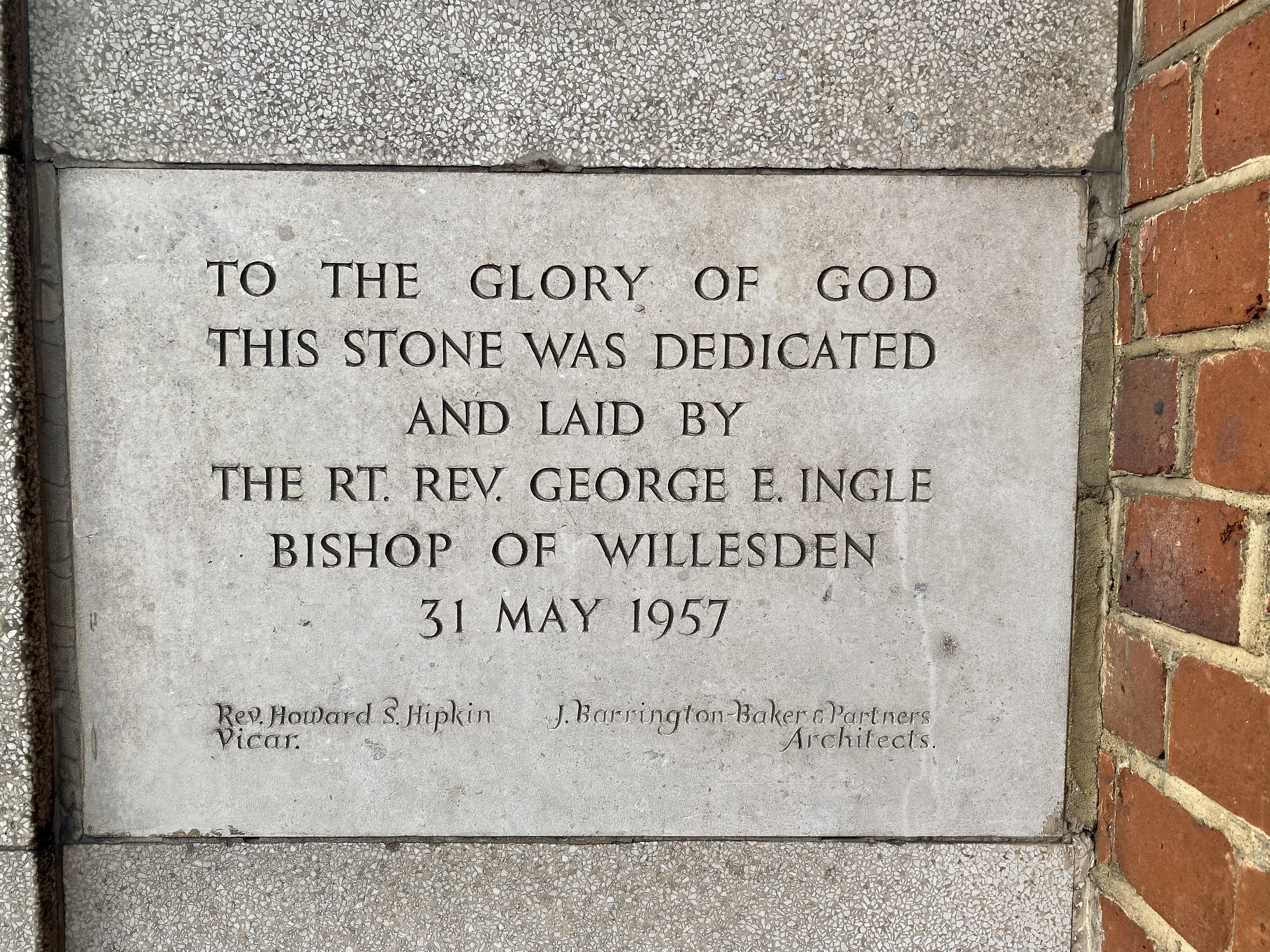
Date stone showing italic for small text, London, 1957

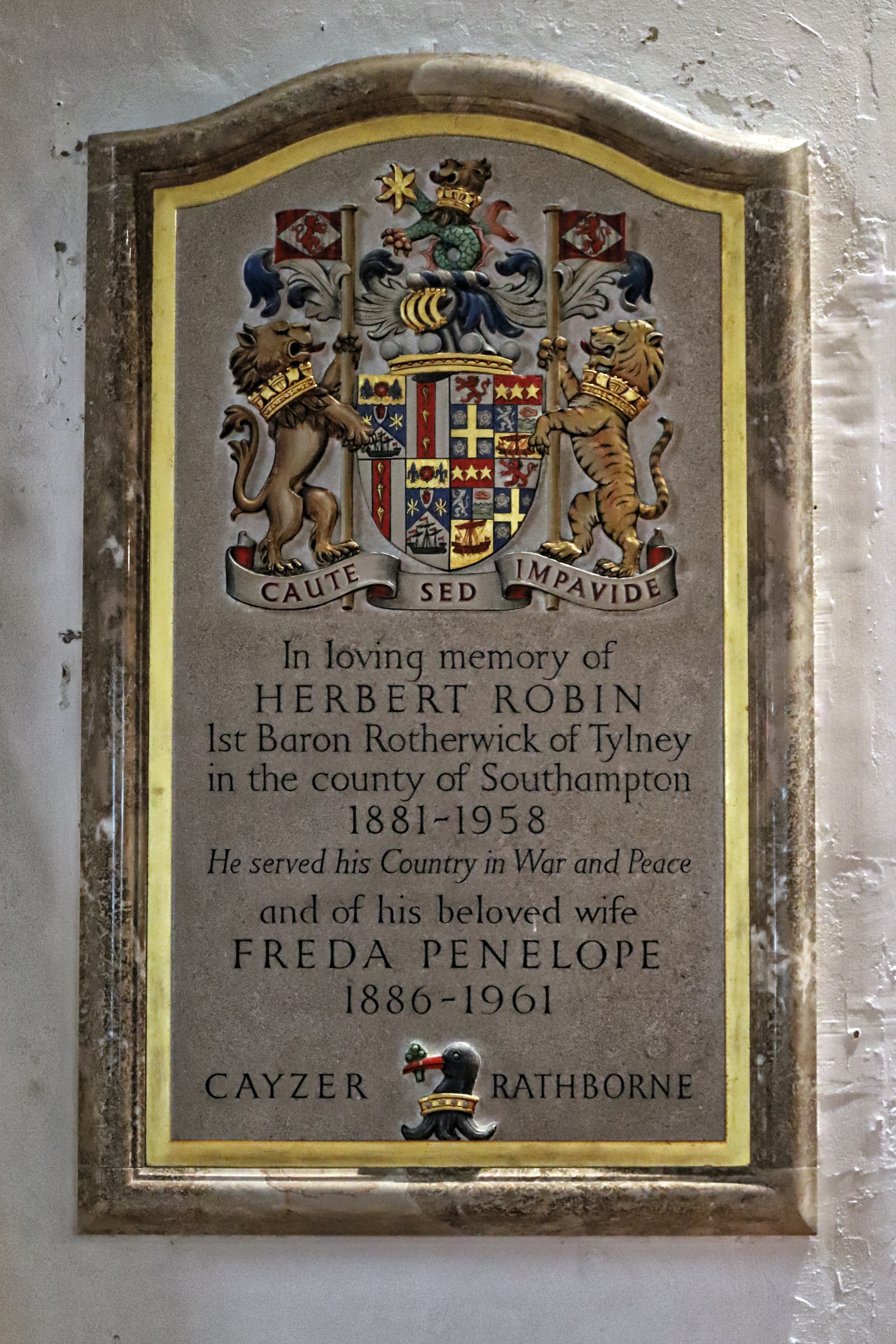
Memorial to Herbert and Freda Penelope Cayzer

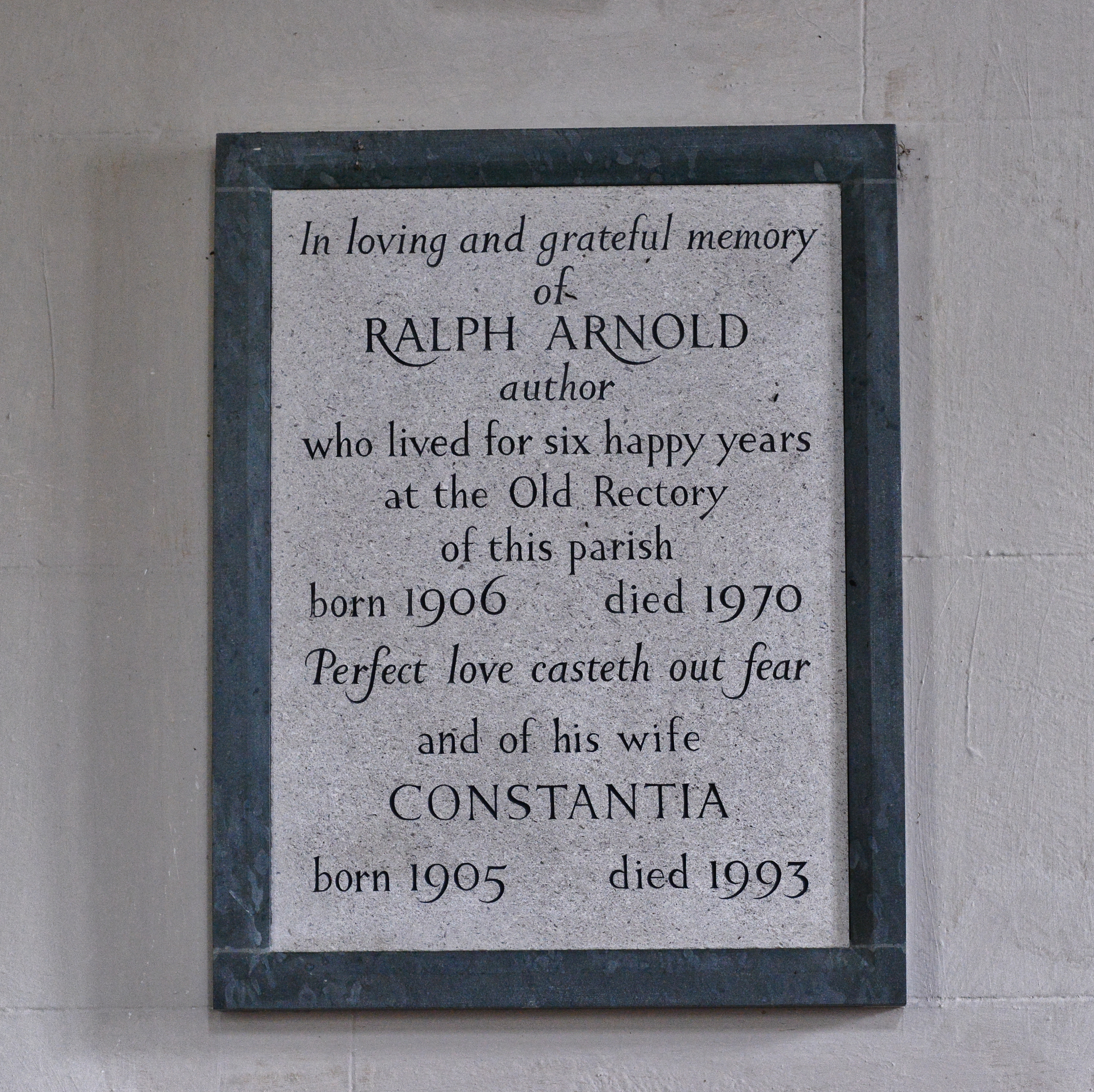
Memorial to Ralph and Constantia Arnold, Swerford (after 1970)

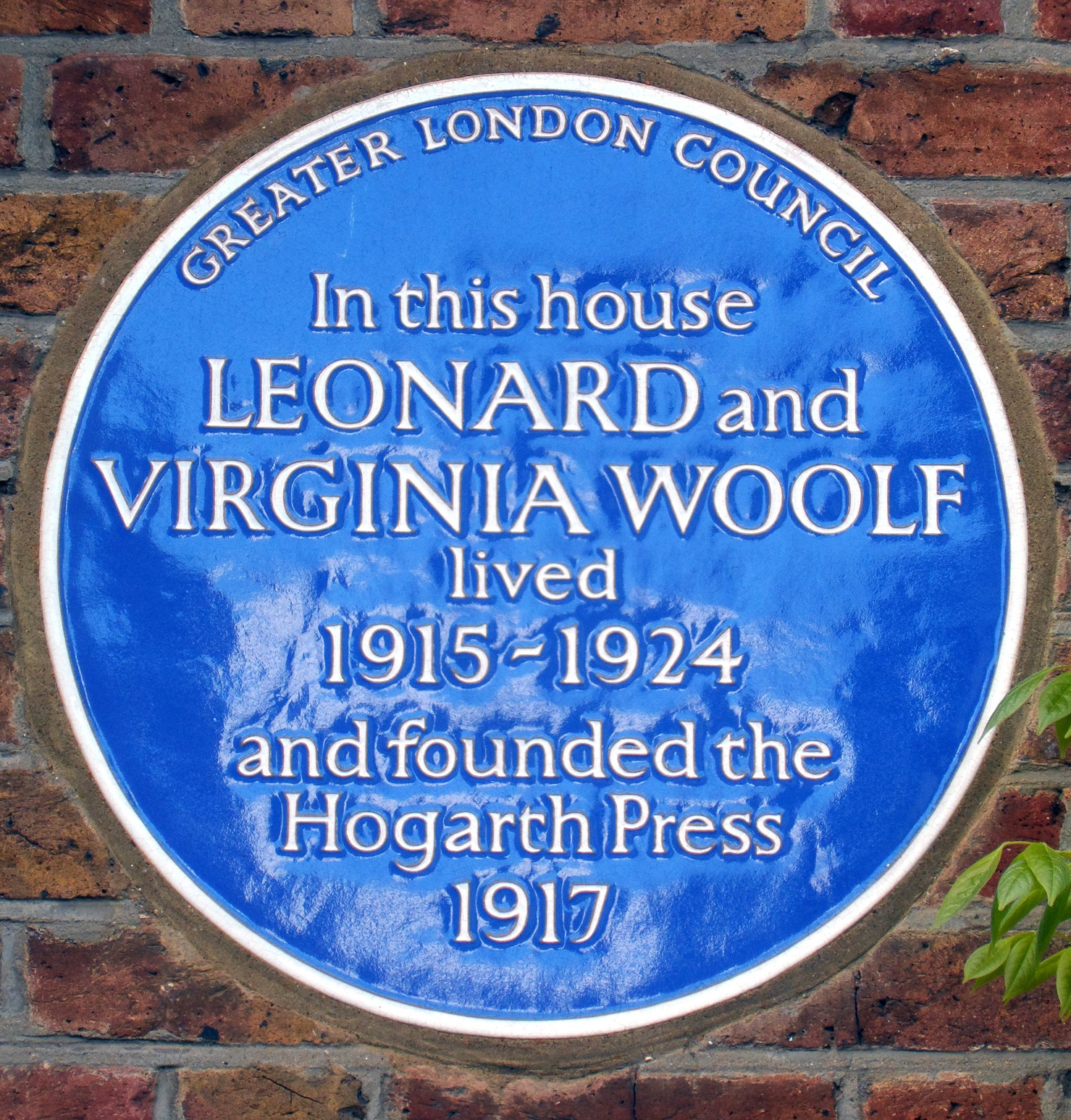
Blue plaque designed by Henry Hooper, 1976

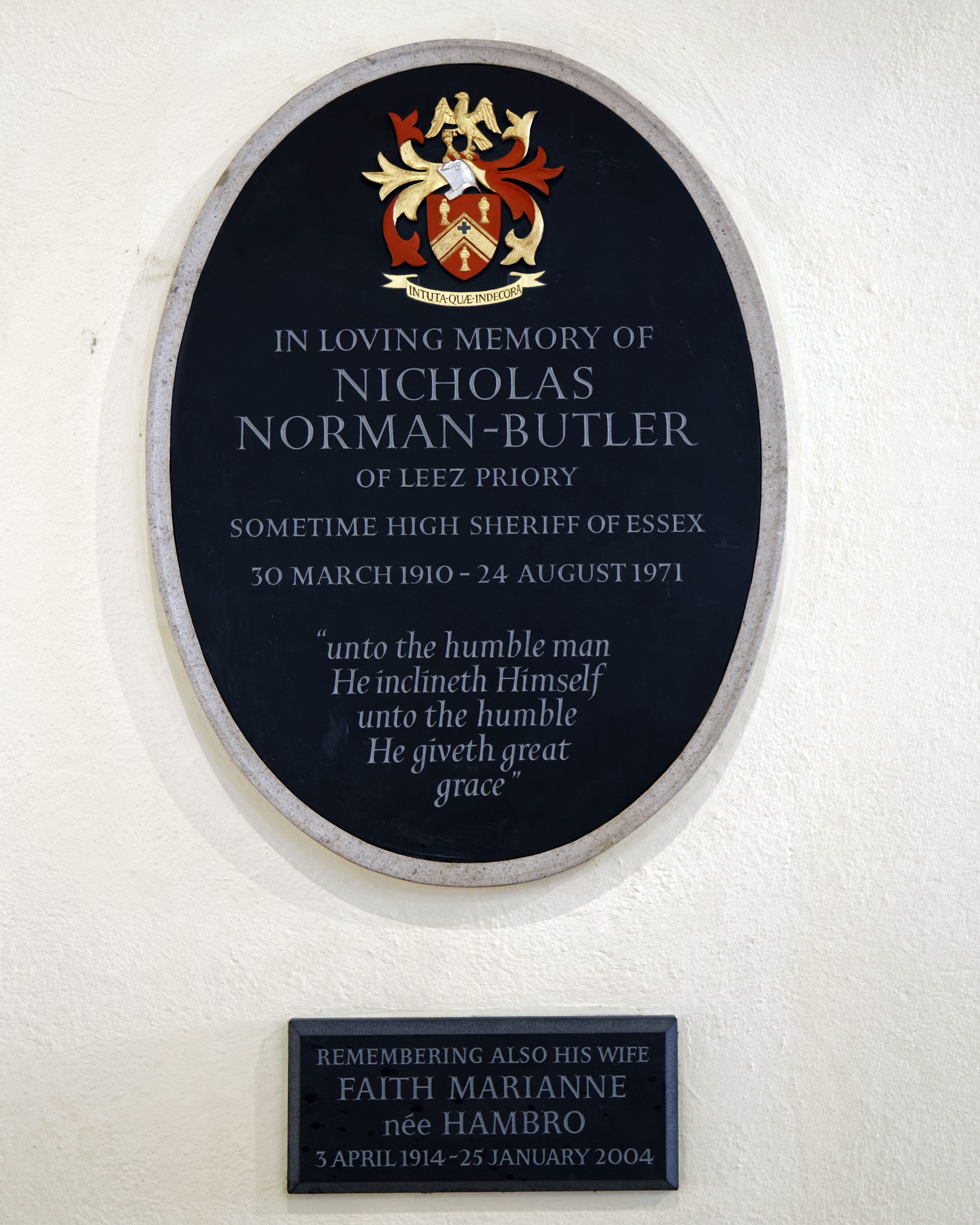
Plaque, Felsted

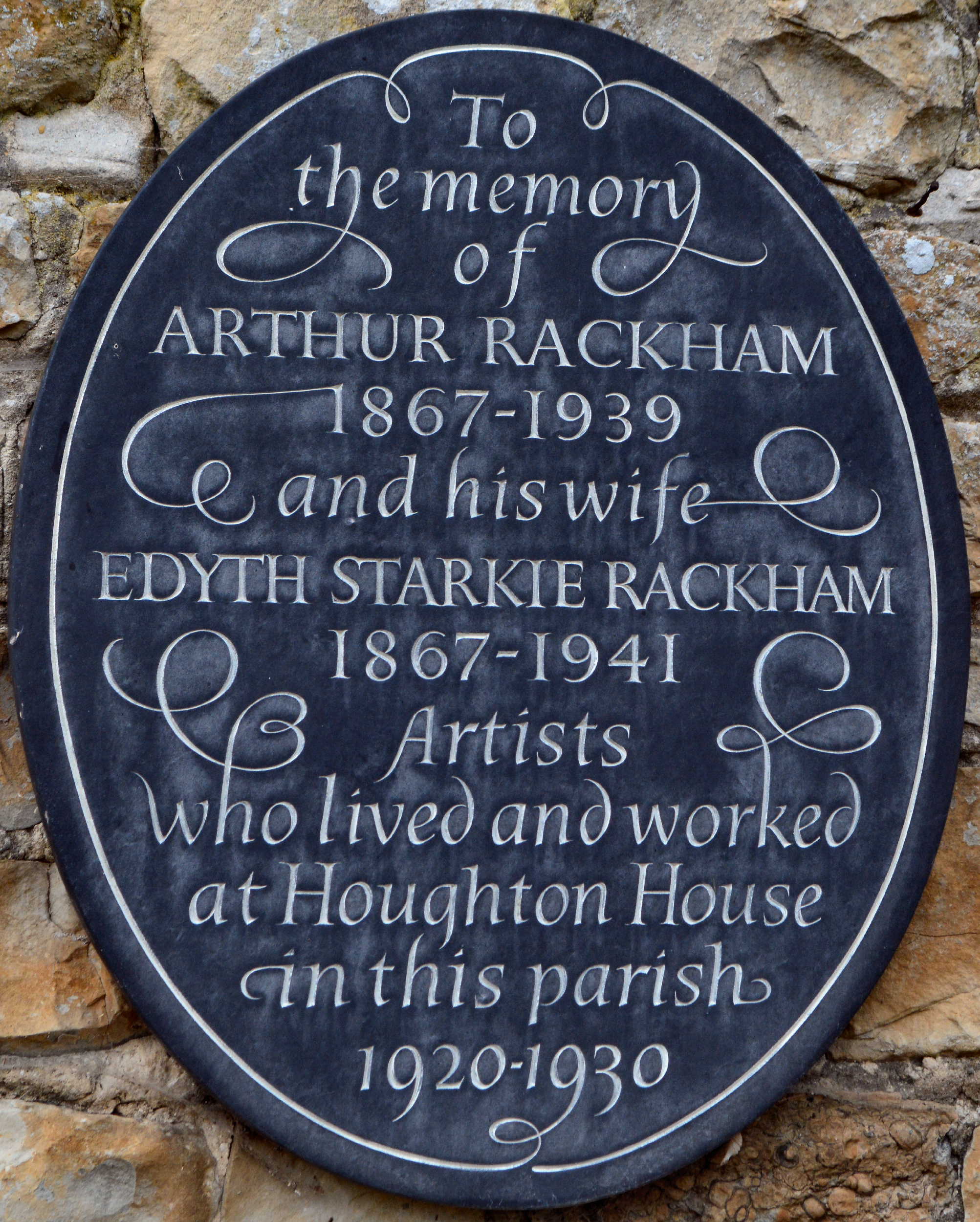
Plaque for Arthur and Edyth Rackham, Amberley

== Printing types and lettering models ==
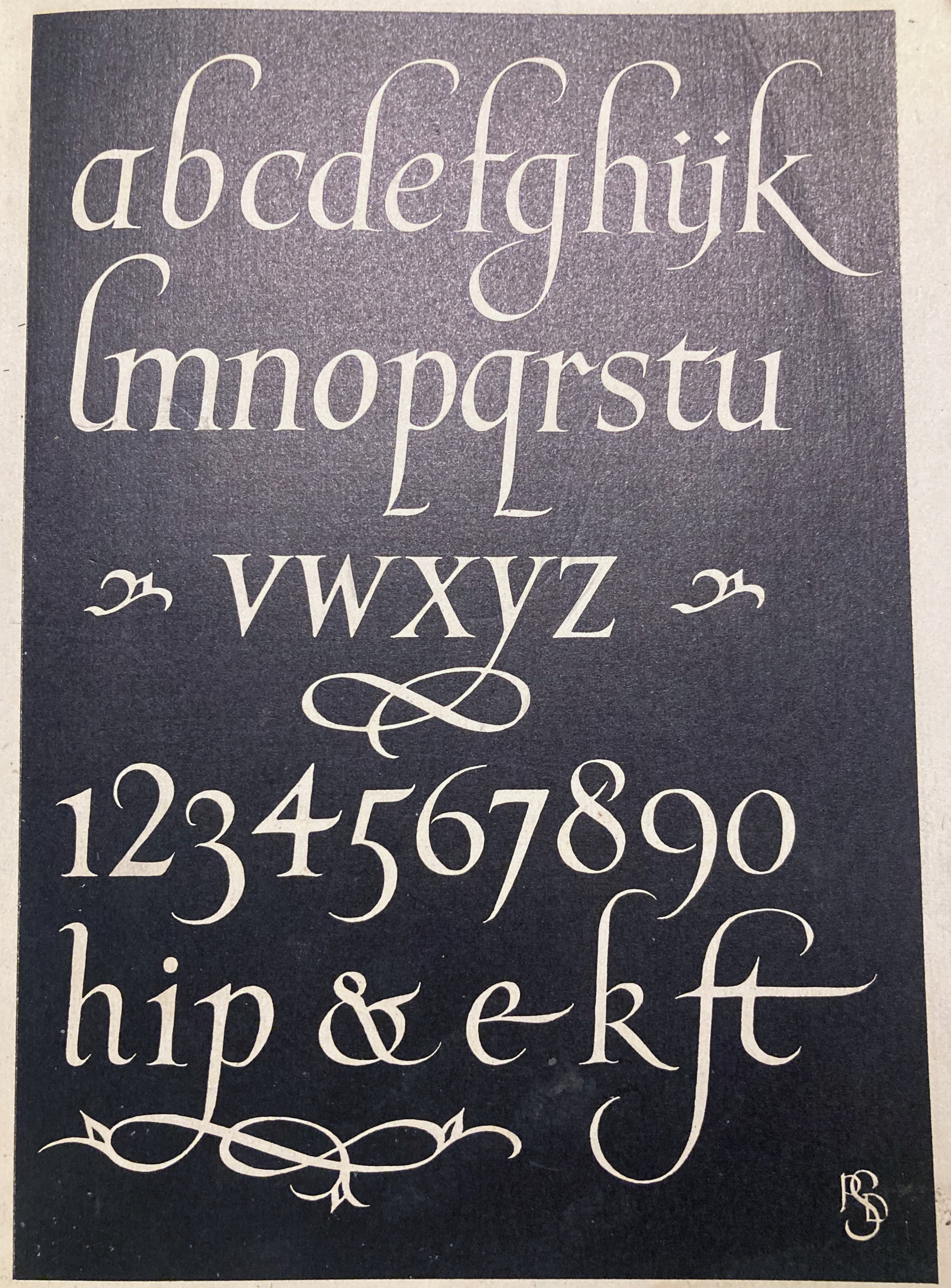
Lettering manual by Percy Delf Smith

Some lettering artists who worked in the Roman lettering style designed typefaces. Johnston was commissioned in 1915 to design a sans-serif typeface for London Underground, which it still uses. Gill designed several serif typefaces for clients and for Monotype such as Perpetua, as well as his Gill Sans sans-serif typeface. Other designers who created typefaces in the style included Reynolds Stone and (more loosely) Will Carter.

Other designers such as Delf Smith created lettering manuals, or models for their students and assistants. In the United States, Frederic Goudy also designed several typefaces based on Roman capitals. Other typefaces based on the style have been published as digital fonts (see below).

== In other countries ==
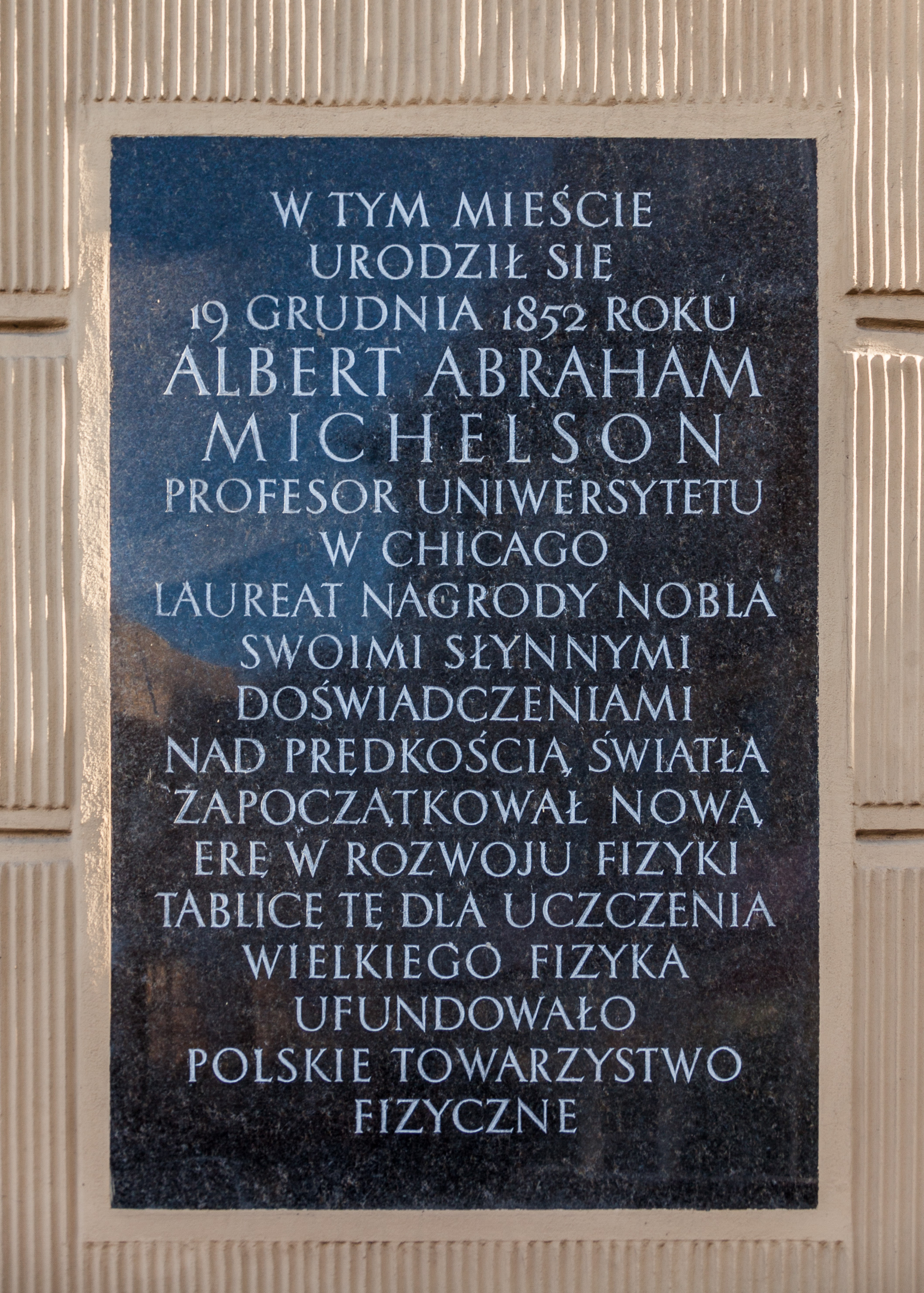
Plaque commemorating the birthplace of Nobel laureate Albert Michelson in Strzelno, Poland

Roman capitals were widely used throughout the Roman Empire, and the property of no designer or country. The wide use of Roman capitals as a "house style" dominating design in the first half of the twentieth century was limited to the UK; Nicolete Gray commented in 1960 that "it has been a purely English movement, and one sees no traces of it on the Continent. One does, however, see many examples in [the] U.S.A. where apart from English influence the work of the letter carver John Howard Benson has been important." (Note: American writer John Nash also concurs, following James Mosley, writing that "The Roman inscriptional capital thrived particularly during three periods: in the Empire of the second century AD; in sixteenth century Italy (principally Rome); and in early twentieth century England".)

However, other artists in the previous century had followed similar directions. In 1846 printer Louis Perrin in Lyon introduced his "Caractères Augustaux" typeface, based on Roman capitals in local collections, and added a lower case in a complementary style inspired by old-style serif typefaces from before the nineteenth century. Other typefaces reproducing Roman capitals were produced in France in the nineteenth century, for instance for scholarly publications.

In the twentieth century there was also interest in Roman capitals in other countries, including Russia.

== Modern situation ==
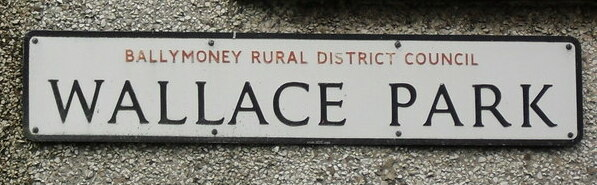
Street sign using lettering by David Kindersley, Northern Ireland

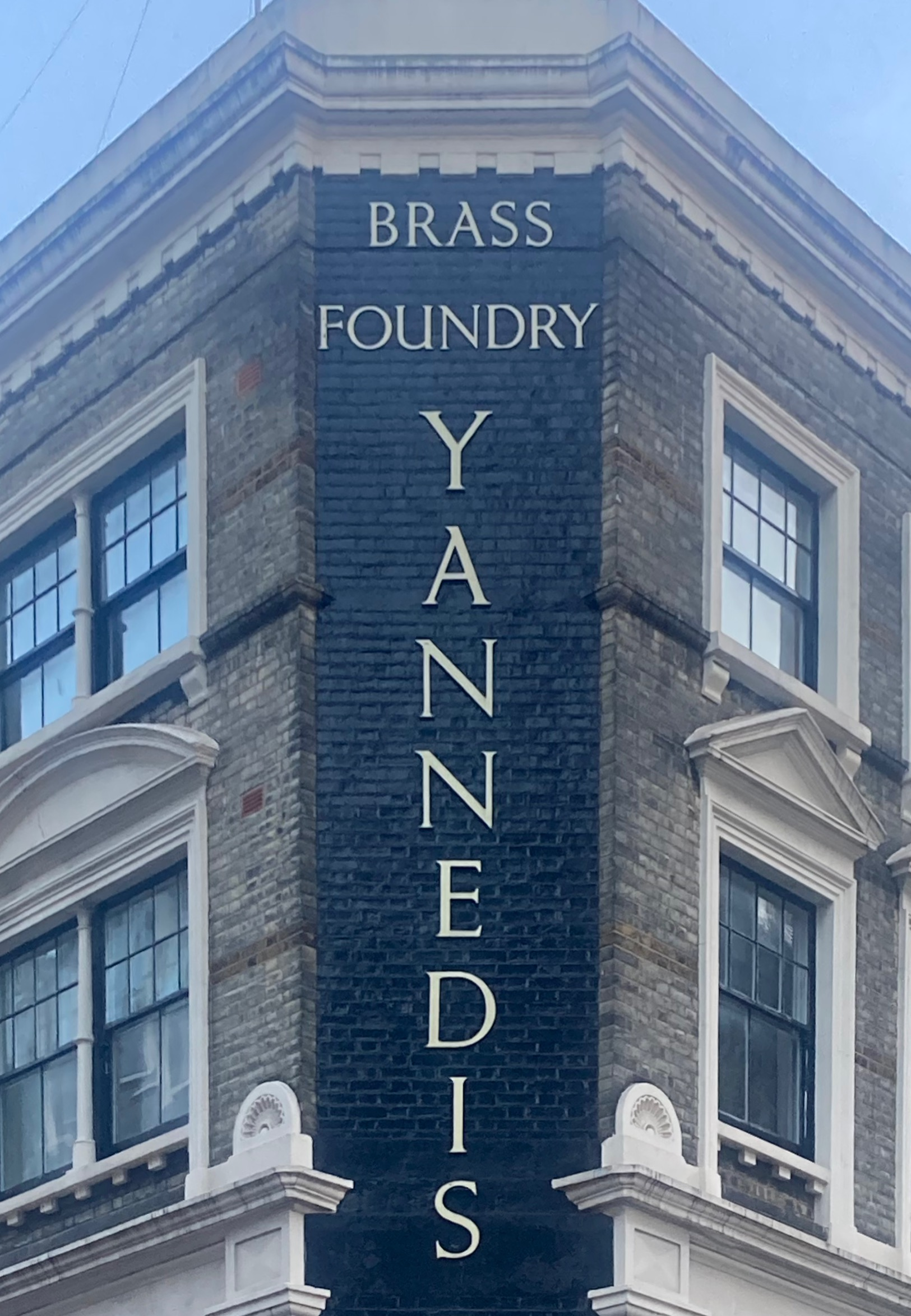
Business sign of Yannedis Brass Foundry, London, in 2023

Examples of Roman-style lettering can be seen in many places across Britain. Kindersley's street sign font is one of the most common designs for street signs in Britain. Use of the Trajan style of lettering has declined somewhat due to changing tastes, with a desire for new styles of lettering. Additionally, custom lettering and signwriting in general has declined in use due to the arrival of phototypesetting and desktop publishing, making it possible to print from a computer font at any size. Meanwhile, some lettering artists who do create artistic work have switched to other more expressive styles, including sans-serifs. (Note: Nash's article on the career of Will Carter is an example of this trend: born in 1912, while his work closely followed the Johnston-Gill style he had been brought up on into his fifties, he also experimented with blunter and bolder styles, commenting in 1982 that "the cut off serif, which was extensively used in what James Mosley so aptly calls the 'English Vernacular' period...has become a great feature of my work because it never disappears from sight as soon as you stand away from it". An interesting reading list illustrating what books on lettering twentieth-century lettering artists used is a catalogue of the books owned by Michael Harvey, which was listed for sale as a group after his 2013 death.) Among historians of lettering, Gray and Mosley both were interested in other styles of lettering, with Mosley particularly arguing for the importance and beauty of the "vernacular" lettering styles that Trajan-style lettering tended to replace. (Note: Mosley also argues that Trajan lettering has been used in historically inappropriate places, such as on the eighteenth-century ship HMS Victory.)

Among digital fonts, Adobe Systems' digital typeface Trajan by Carol Twombly is one of its most popular typefaces. Several digital fonts specifically based on use of Trajan lettering by Arts and Crafts movement artists have also been published.
