= Michael Renton =

Michael Renton (London, 1 January 1934 - Winchester, 15 July 2001) was a British artist who worked in wood engraving, stonecarving, sign writing and lettering.
