= M. C. Oliver =

- Born: Mervyn Cecil Oliver; 1886; London, England
- Died: 1958 (Age 72); London, England
- Education: Edward Johnston, Royal College of Arts
- Known for: Calligraphy, Silversmithing
- Awards: MBE

Mervyn C. Oliver MBE (3 March 1886 – 10 December 1958) was a twentieth century British calligrapher and silversmith taught by Edward Johnston and an early Craft Member of the Society of Scribes and Illuminators (SSI). He is most renowned for his work on the Stalingrad Sword as well as the designing of several war memorials throughout the United Kingdom including those at Durham University and Eton College. His work has been exhibited throughout Europe and America, most notably in London's Victoria & Albert Museum, and the Harrison collection in San Francisco's Public Library, both of which still retain a few examples of his work amongst the other pieces of twentieth century calligraphy they maintain.

Oliver taught at the Central School of Arts and Crafts, London, at the Chelsea School of Art, at Saint Martin's School of Art and at the Hampstead Garden Suburb Institute. He is hailed by the Society of Scribes and Illuminators as being one of the "greatest British teachers of the twentieth century." He played a major part in the revival of British calligraphy begun by Edward Johnston in the early 1900s, with former pupils including the former chairwoman of the SSI Heather Child. Oliver was the author of the chapters on the design of manuscript books and inscriptions, and the development of illumination in The Calligrapher's Handbook (1956) and was awarded the MBE for his contributions to British art in the same year.
