= Delft (disambiguation) =

Delft is a city in the Netherlands.

Delft may also refer to:

== Other places ==
- Delft, Western Cape, a township in South Africa
- Neduntheevu, an island in Sri Lanka
  - Delft Island fort, in Sri Lanka
- Delft University of Technology, a Dutch public university
- Delft, Minnesota, United States
- Delft Colony, California, United States

== Other uses ==
- Delft jewelry
- Delft pottery
- Dutch ship Delft, several ships in the Dutch Navy
- Battle of Delft, a battle during the Sri Lankan Civil War

== See also ==
- Delft School (disambiguation), in the arts
- Deft (disambiguation)
