= Delf =

Delf may refer to:

- Delf (waterway), in Delfzijl, Netherlands
- Barrie Delf (born 1961), English professional footballer
- Marion Delf-Smith (1883–1980), British botanist whose author abbreviation is "Delf"
- Percy Delf Smith (1882–1948), British artist, husband of Marion Delf-Smith
- DELF - Diplôme d'études en langue française - a certification of French language abilities
- Delftware, a type of pottery from Delft, the Netherlands

== See also ==
- Delfs, a surname
- Delph (disambiguation)
