= Delph (disambiguation) =

Delph is a village in Greater Manchester, England.

Delph may also refer to:

- Delph, the Hiberno-English term for delftware
- Delph, Alberta, a locality in Canada
- Delph Donkey, railway line which formerly served Delph
- Delph Locks (or, Delph Nine), a series of locks on the Dudley No. 1 Canal in Brierley Hill, in the West Midlands, England
- Delph railway station, which formerly served Delph
- Ivey Delph Apartments, historic apartment building located in Hamilton Heights, New York
- Fabian Delph (born 1989), English footballer
- John M. Delph (1805–1891), a mayor of Louisville, Kentucky
- Marvin Delph (born 1956), American basketball player
- Mike Delph (born 1970), American politician (Indiana)
- Paul Delph (1957–1996), American musician

== See also ==
- Delf (disambiguation)
- Delft (disambiguation)
