= Delfs =

Delfs is a surname. Notable people with the surname include:

- Andreas Delfs (born 1959), German conductor
- Flemming Delfs (born 1951), Danish badminton player
- Len Delfs (1920–1973), Australian rules footballer

== See also ==
- Delf (disambiguation)
