= HMS Monmouth (1796) =

British ship of the line (1796–1834)

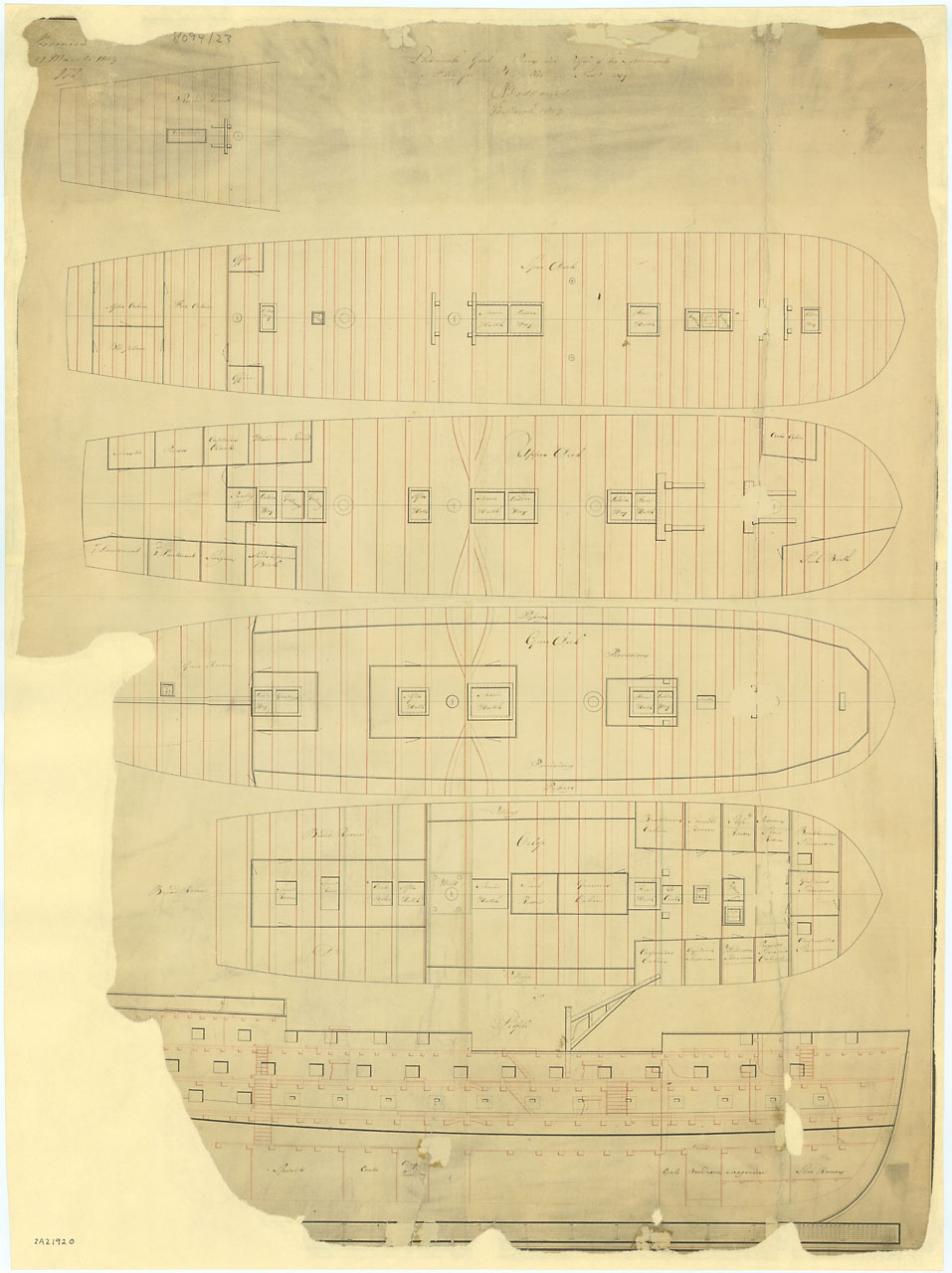
- Original EIC Ship plan for the Monmouth 1796

History

Great Britain
- Name: HMS Monmouth
- Builder: Randall & Co, Rotherhithe
- Launched: 23 April 1796
- Completed: 31 October 1796
- Acquired: 14 July 1795
- Honours and awards: Naval General Service Medal with clasps: "Camperdown"; "Egypt"
- Fate: Broken up in May 1834

General characteristics
- Class & type: 64-gun third rate ship of the line
- Tons burthen: 1,439 51/94 (bm)
- Length: 173 ft 1 in (52.8 m) (overall); 144 ft 1 1/2 in (43.9 m) (keel)
- Beam: 43 ft 4 in (13.2 m)
- Depth of hold: 19 ft 8 in (6.0 m)
- Propulsion: Sails
- Sail plan: Full-rigged ship
- Complement: 491
- Armament: Lower deck: 26 × 24-pounder guns; Upper deck: 26 × 18-pounder guns; QD: 10 × 9-pounder guns; Fc: 2 × 9-pounder guns

HMS Monmouth was a 64-gun third rate ship of the line of the Royal Navy, launched on 23 April 1796 at Rotherhithe. She had been designed and laid down for the East India Company, but the Navy purchased her after the start of the French Revolutionary War. She served at the Battle of Camperdown and during the Napoleonic Wars. Hulked in 1815, she was broken up in 1834.

== Construction and commissioning ==
Monmouth was originally being built as an East Indiaman for the East India Company under the name Belmont. In 1796 the Navy purchased five ships being built or serviced in commercial dockyards along the River Thames and had them completed as warships. Alongside Belmont, then being built at Rotherhithe by Randall & Company, the Navy acquired the merchantmen Royal Admiral, Princess Royal, Earl Talbot and Pigot; they became HMS York, HMS Ardent, HMS Agincourt and HMS Lancaster respectively. Belmont was registered and named Monmouth on 14 July 1795 and was launched on 23 April 1796, being completed by 31 October 1796 at Deptford Dockyard.

== French Revolutionary Wars ==
HMS Monmouth was commissioned in September 1796 under the command of the Captain William Carnegie, Earl of Northesk. She was initially assigned to serve in the North Sea, and in May 1797 was one of the ships involved in the Nore mutiny. The crew took her first lieutenant, Charles Bullen, prisoner and threatened to execute him. Northesk intervened and Bullen was able to carry messages from the crew that are said to have helped end the mutiny. After the mutiny Northesk resigned his commission. Order was restored in a matter of weeks, and Monmouth was placed under Commander James Walker, in an acting captaincy. Walker had been planning to attack the mutinous ships at anchor with a squadron of gunboats only a few weeks previously.

Walker commanded Monmouth at the Battle of Camperdown in October 1797. Admiral Adam Duncan led the fleet to meet the Dutch.

Before the battle Walker addressed his crew, saying:

"Now, my lads, you see your enemy before you. I shall lay you close on board, and thus give you an opportunity of washing the stain off your characters with the blood of your foes. Go to your quarters, and do your duty."

Monmouth engaged in heavy combat with the Dutch ships Delft and Alkmaar, capturing both, although Delft sank on the way back. (Note: Delft sank in British waters but is being rebuilt now (2011) in the Netherlands.) In the battle Monmouth had five men killed and 22 wounded. In 1847 the Admiralty awarded the Naval General Service Medal with clasp "Camperdown" to all surviving claimants from the action.

In March 1798, Robert Deans became captain. Monmouth was among the seven vessels of Lord Duncan's fleet that shared in the prize money for the privateer Jupiter, captured on 27 April.

In January 1799 Vice-Admiral Archibald Dickson raised his flag in her, but she then went into Sheerness in March for repairs. Next month, Captain George Hart, who retained the command until 1805, replaced Deans. Then Monmouth was among the vessels sharing in the prize money from sundry Dutch doggers, schuyts, and fishing vessels, taken in April and May. Monarch was also part of a squadron that in May captured Roose (12 May), Genet, Polly, American, Forsigtigheid, and Bergen (all 14 May), Des Finch (21 May), and Vrow Dorothea (30 May).

That summer, Monmouth took part in the Helder expedition, a joint Anglo-Russian invasion of Holland under the command of Vice-Admiral Andrew Mitchell. At the Neiuw Diep the British captured seven warships and 13 Indiamen and transports. (Note: Prize money to a seaman for these vessels amounted to 6s and 8d.) Then Mitchell obtained the surrender of a squadron of the navy of the Batavian Republic in the Vlieter Incident. The Dutch surrendered twelve vessels ranging down in size from the 74-gun Washington to the 16-gun brig Galathea. (Note: A distribution in June 1805 for a minor portion of the prize money for this incident netted a seaman 1s 10d.) Next, Monmouth was among the vessels sharing in the capture on 17 August of Adelarde. On 15 September Monmouth, several other British vessels and two Russian, arrived at Sheerness as escort to five Dutch ships of the line, three frigates and one sloop.

Monmouth sailed for the Mediterranean in June 1801. She therefore came to share in the proceeds of the capture of Almas di Purgatoria off Alexandria on 28 July. Because Monmouth served in the navy's Egyptian campaign (8 March to 8 September 1801), her officers and crew qualified for the clasp "Egypt" to the Naval General Service Medal that the Admiralty authorised in 1850 for all surviving claimants. (Note: A first-class share of the prize money awarded in April 1823 was worth £34 2s 4d; a fifth-class share, that of a seaman, was worth 3s 11 1/2d. The amount was small as the crews of 79 vessels and the entire army contingent shared the total.)

== Napoleonic Wars ==
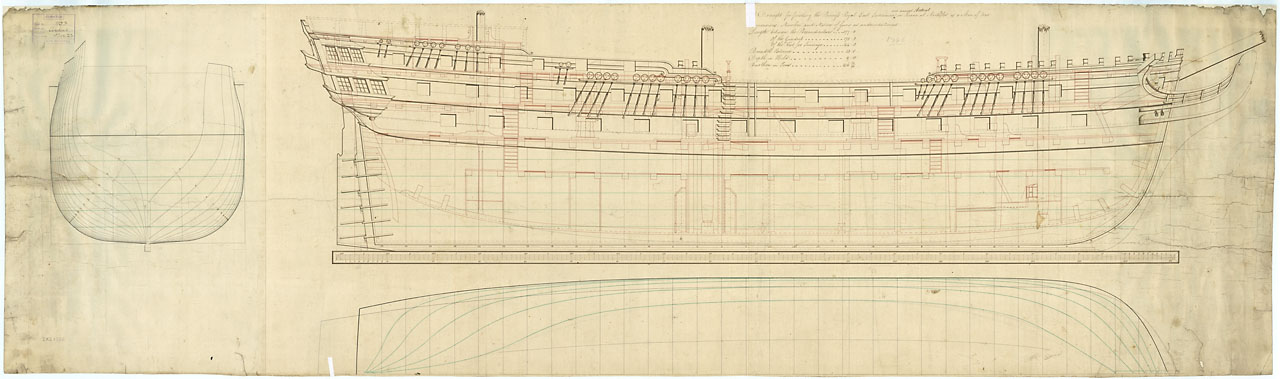
Monmouth (1797) modified for the Royal Navy

In 1803 Monmouth, still under Hart's command, was at Gibraltar. There Hart received the report of Captain John Gore of Medusa of his capture of one French felucca-rigged privateer in the Strait, Esperance, and destruction of another, the Sorcier. In July Monmouth was with the Mediterranean squadron blockading Toulon. After his promotion to rear admiral in April 1804 Thomas McNamara Russell raised his flag in Monmouth for the North Sea.

Captain Edward Durnford King commissioned Monmouth again in March 1807. Rear-Admiral William O'Bryen Drury raised his flag in her on 7 September and then eight days later sailed her with a convoy of nine Indiamen to the East Indies, seven for the coast and two for Bombay. The convoy was reported well on 28 November at 30°10′S 5°20′W. The vessels she was convoying included Northampton, Sarah Christiana, Ann, Union, Diana, Sir William Pulteney, and Glory.

During the voyage, on 25 January 1808 she captured the Danish ship Nancy. Then on 12 February she arrived off the Danish possession of Tranquebar just in time to observe the landing of troops of the 14th Regiment of Foot and the Honourable East India Company's artillery by Russell. The British immediately went on to capture the settlement and fort, which capitulated without resistance. (Note: In February 1824 prize money was paid to the troops, artillerymen, and the crews of both Royal Navy vessels. A first-class share for Monmouth was worth £254 16s 11 1/2d; a fifth-class share was worth 18s 11 1/2d.)

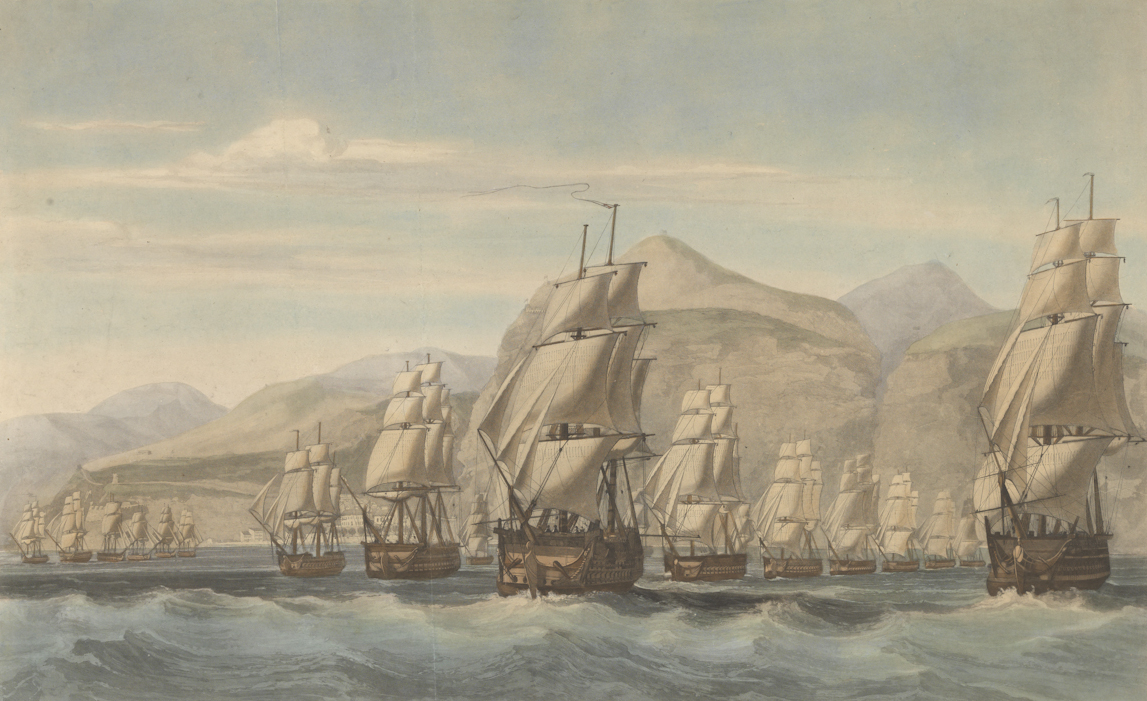
The Windham an East India Man with the Fleet sailing from St Helena, under convoy of His Majesty's ship Monmouth in 1808

Monmouth returned to Britain in September 1808, having escorted another convoy of Indiamen. She was put out of commission on 24 September. In August 1809 Monmouth was at the Walcheren Expedition, the aim of which was to demolish the dockyards and arsenals at Antwerp, Terneuzen, and Flushing. In August Admiral Sir Richard Strachan sent her back to England for water. In October she was commissioned again under Commander Michael Dod, but as a victualing ship in the Downs.

His successor on 7 November 1810 was Captain Francis Beauman. At the time Monmouth was the flagship of Vice-Admiral George Campbell, Commander-in-Chief of the Downs station. In March Beauman presented a sword (worth 100 guineas) to Campbell on behalf of all the captains and commanders on the Downs station on the occasion of Campbell's being relieved of his command. In April 1811 Captain Hyde Parker took command of Monmouth.

From 1812 to 1813 she was under the command of Captain William Nowell. His successor was Captain William Wilkinson. Throughout this time she was also the flagship for Vice-Admiral Thomas Foley, Campbell's successor. She received payment for smuggled goods seized on 1 March 1814. (Note: A first-class share was worth £43 10s 4 1/2d; a fifth-class share, that of a seaman, was worth 1s 8 3/4.)

== Fate ==
Monmouth was laid up in ordinary at Woolwich in 1815. She then was hulked, becoming a sheer hulk at Deptford dockyard. She was broken up in 1834.
