= Cornelis Verwoerd =

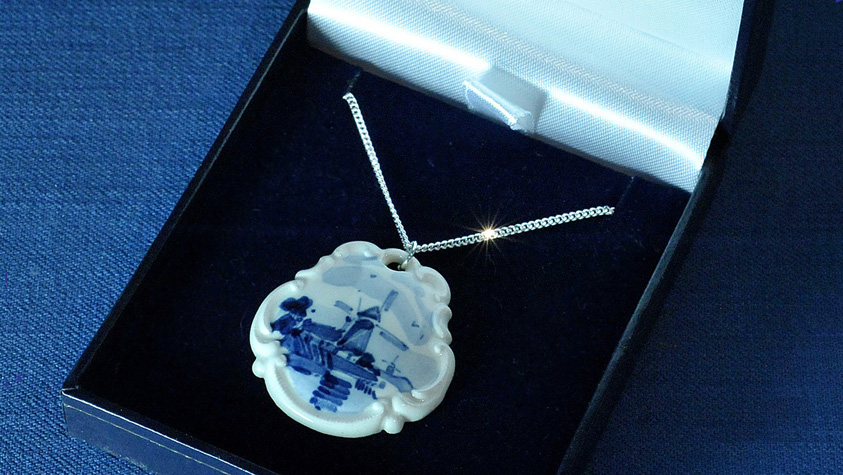
- A 1952 Delft pendant by Verwoerd
- Born: 10 February 1913
- Died: 19 December 2000 (aged 87)
- Known for: Delftware, contemporary Ceramics

Cornelis (Kees, Cor) Verwoerd (Rotterdam, 10 February 1913 – Gouda, 19 December 2000) was a Dutch Delftware painter, modeler, and ceramist.

== Life and work ==
Verwoerd was born in 1913 in Rotterdam, Netherlands, the son of cattle trader and car mechanic Leendert Verwoerd and Maria van der Hoeven. At an early age his family moved to the city of Gouda. After leaving primary school, he started working as an errand boy for a local porcelain and pottery store, and was frequently asked to collect orders from Gouda pottery and Delftware factory "Plateelbakkerij Zuid-Holland" (PZH). In May 1927, at the age of 14, he joined PZH as a painter's apprentice and remained there until December 1931 when, after several strikes, most painters lost their jobs due to the Great Depression. In 1934, Verwoerd joined pottery “Zenith Gouda” where he worked as a Delftware painter under chief painter Aart Stolk. In 1937, Verwoerd moved to “Plateelbakkerij Schoonhoven" of Schoonhoven to work under their artistic leader Frans van Katwijk. In 1940, he rejoined Zenith Gouda, initially as a Delft decorator, but soon as their chief modeler.

In 1949, Verwoerd established his own ceramics Studio in Gouda by the name of "Keramiek Atelier C.Verwoerd.” Possibly inspired by Frans van Katwijk who did something similar in 1946, the Studio specialized in the production of miniature Delft brooch panels or “Delft stones” for application in Delft jewelry, like brooches, bracelets, and pendants. His main clients were silversmiths G.J. van den Bergh Jr, and G.J. van den Bergh & Son, both from Schoonhoven, and the Amsterdam wholesale firm of F. Eisner. From day one, Verwoerd had to cope with the already fast approaching wave of cheap reproduction methods. In doing so, he managed to push the art of miniature Delft painting to a new level. His work stood out because of its painterly quality, and the delicate, non aggressive shades of blue.

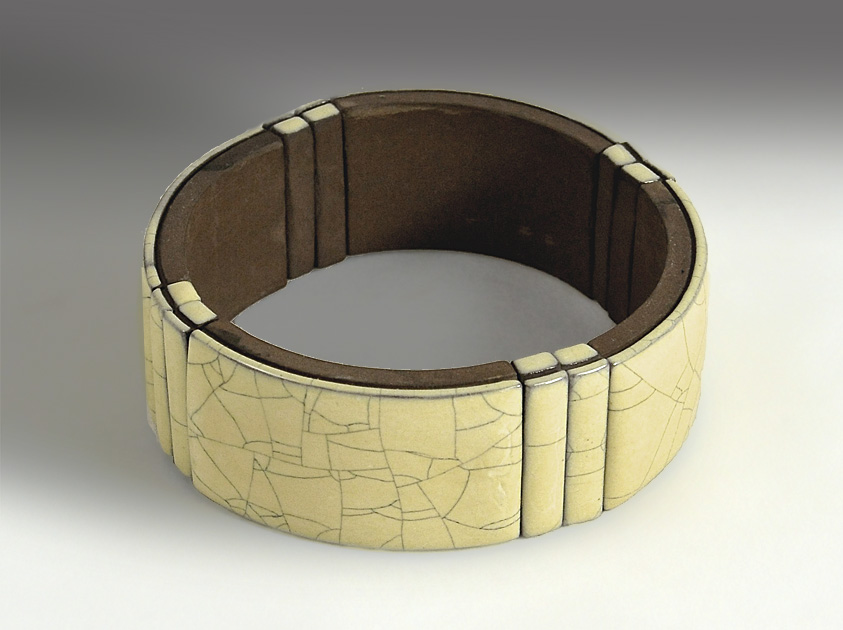
1958 Verwoerd crazed ivory bracelet

Verwoerd was not the only specialist for Delft brooch panels after WW2. His main competitors were “Atelier Van Katwijk” founded by Frans van Katwijk who had left Schoonhoven and established his own Studio in Gouda in 1946, and “Kunstatelier Porceletti” founded by Dick Olthuysen in the mid 1950s. They started off producing hand painted brooch panels, but near the end of the 50s resorted to screen printing or transfer printing. From that moment until 1976, when the Studio closed its doors, Verwoerd was the main specialist producer of hand-painted Delft miniatures.

In 1957 and 1958, the Verwoerd Ceramics Studio produced a series of contemporary ceramic necklaces and bracelets that were specially designed to fit the female neckline and wrist, and that featured some exquisite coloured glazing of which ivory and strawberry red. The ceramic jewelry was sold in a limited number of specialized shops in the Netherlands and Belgium, including Metz & Co of Amsterdam. The project was quite successful in an artistic sense, but proved to be extremely labour-intensive, and was shelved after 1958. As a result, the bracelets and necklaces remain relatively scarce.

== Personal life ==
On 15 November 1939 Verwoerd married Maria Peels, born 19 December 1914 in Cologne, Germany. He died on 19 December 2000 in Gouda.
