= Free Church, Hampstead Garden Suburb =

Coordinates: 51°34′51.98″N 00°11′27.11″W

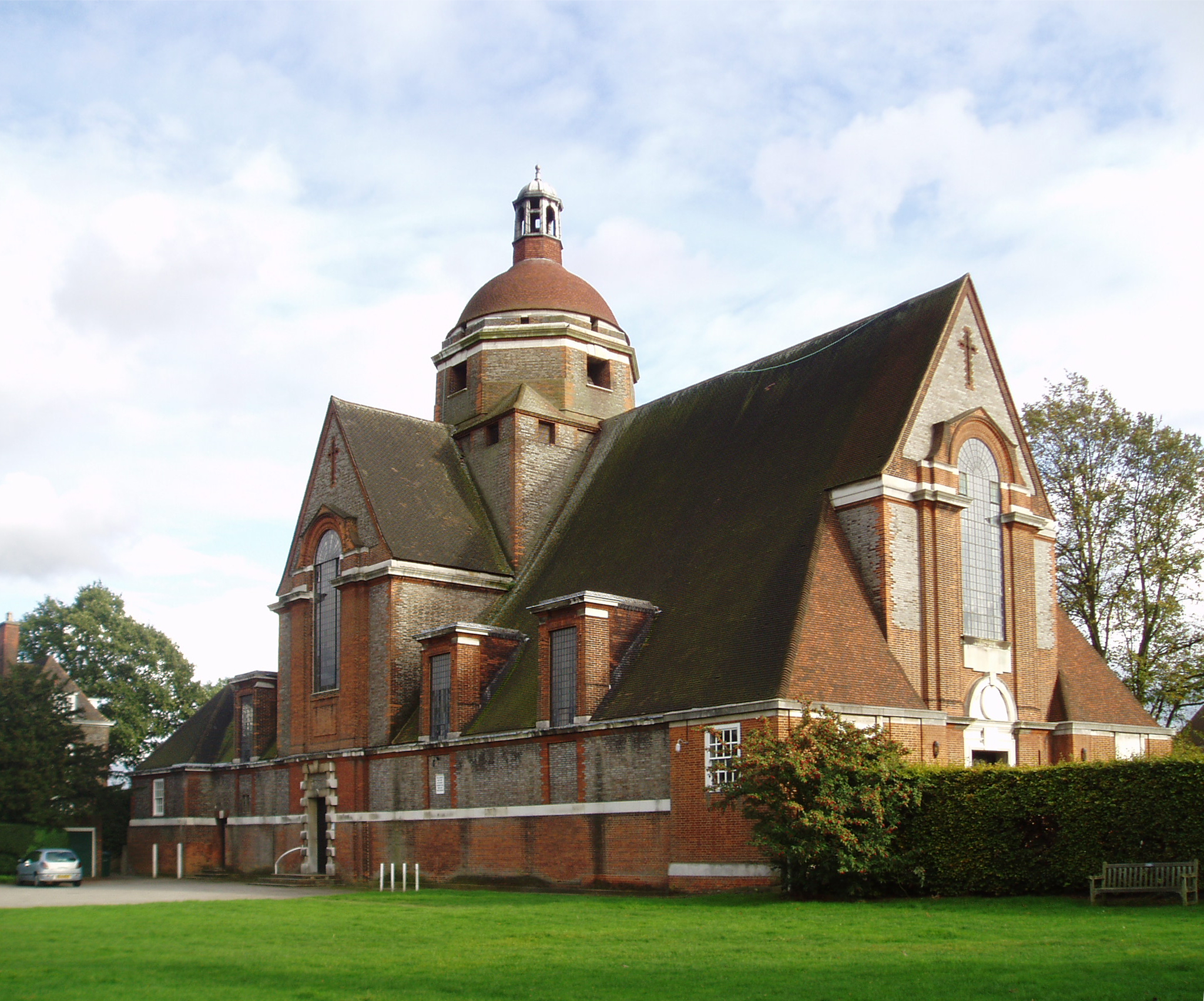
- Free Church, Hampstead Garden Suburb
- Country: England
- Denomination: United Reformed Church/Baptist
- Website: Official website

The Free Church is a building located in Hampstead Garden Suburb, Barnet, London. It was built to a design by Sir Edwin Lutyens starting in 1911, and, like St Jude's Church at the opposite side of Central Square, is a Grade I listed building.

== History ==
Initially, Christians in Hampstead Garden Suburb congregated together, but it was decided in 1909 to organise the Church of England and Free Church meetings separately. The Free Church first met, before the existence of the building, in 1909 and was officially founded in 1910.

Construction of the Free Church building was begun on 16 January 1911. It opened for worship on 25 October that year, though its West end was not completed until the 1960s. It was designed by Sir Edwin Lutyens, the consultant architect for the Central Square of Hampstead Garden Suburb from 1906. He had influence on the design of the whole square, including both churches.

== Architecture ==
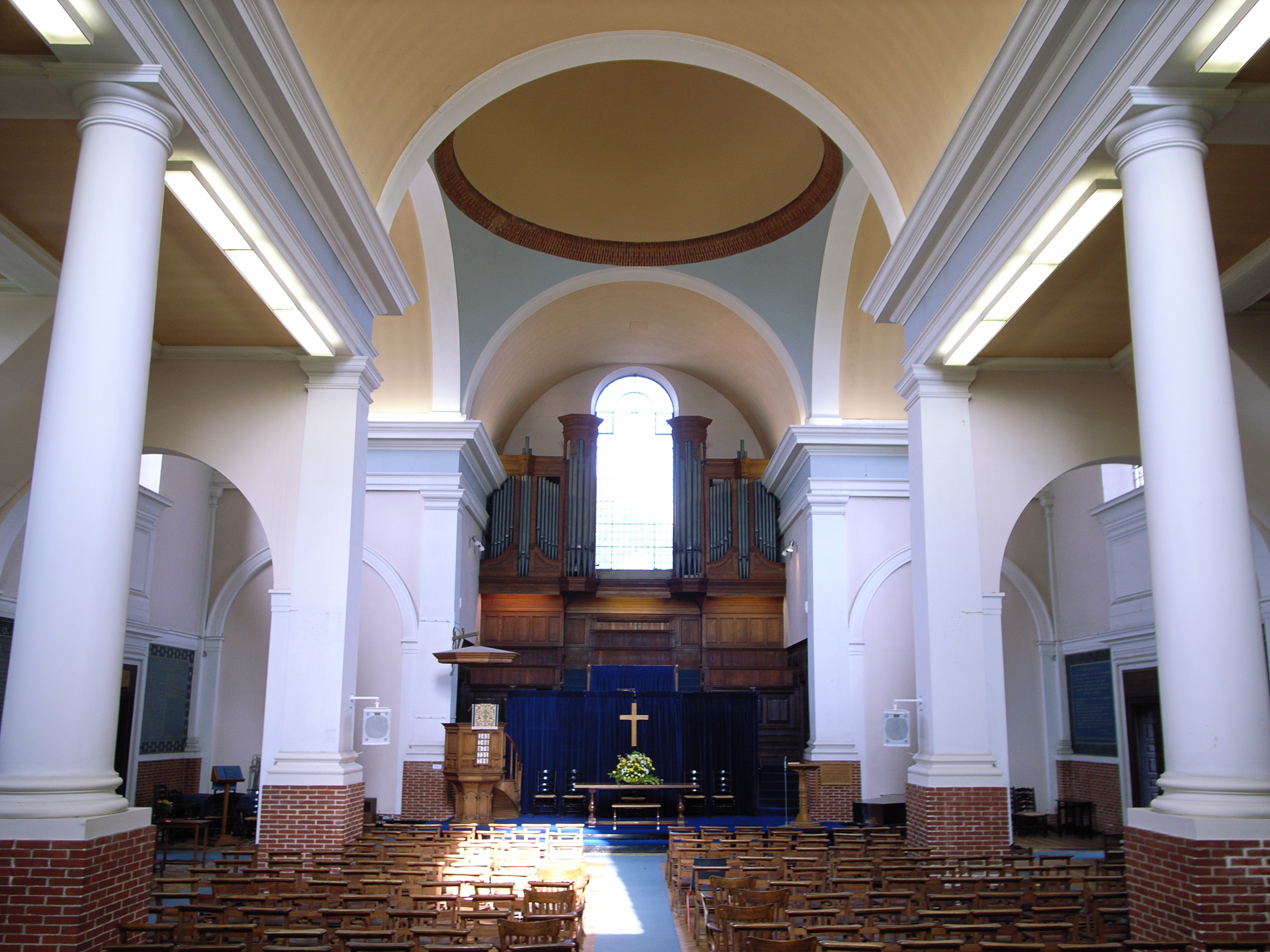
An interior view of the church, showing the altar, organ and dome

The church has a low concrete dome, by contrast to the spire of St Jude's. The interior features Tuscan columns with brick plinths, and a barrel vault. The interior is in pastel colours. The church has two war memorial panels designed by Percy Delf Smith.
