= Delft School =

Delft School may refer to:

- Delft School (painting), school in 17th century Dutch painting
- Delft School (architecture), school in 20th century Dutch architecture

== See also ==
- Delft (disambiguation)
