= Percy Delf Smith =

English artist and engraver (1882–1948)

Percy Delf Smith RDI
- Delf Smith, 1928
- Born: Percy John Smith; March 1882; Dulwich, Surrey, England
- Died: 30 October 1948 (aged 66)
- Education: Camberwell College of Arts; Central School of Arts and Crafts
- Known for: Lettering art; calligraphy; First World War art
- Movement: Arts and Crafts movement; Roman lettering; First World War art
- Spouse: Ellen Marion Delf (m. 1928)

Percy John Delf Smith (Note: Delf Smith was known under his birth name during his early career until he married and shared his wife's surname. This article uses Delf Smith throughout for consistency and as his preferred name after his marriage.) RDI (March 1882 – 30 October 1948) was a British artist who worked in engraving, painting, lettering, calligraphy and book design.

== Early life ==
Born Percy John Smith in Dulwich, London, Delf Smith took an apprenticeship with furniture maker Frederick Staddon before studying at Camberwell and the Central Schools of Arts and Crafts. His instructor in lettering at Camberwell was Edward Johnston, an extremely influential calligrapher and lettering artist whose Arts and Crafts movement style of lettering and use of Roman capitals had a strong influence on Delf Smith's career. Johnston's successor was Graily Hewitt, one of Johnston's pupils; Hewitt when he left recommended Delf Smith for the position himself. Delf Smith then established a career as a lettering artist and teaching the topic, publishing Lettering & Writing, a slipcase of lettering models, in 1908.

Johnston and his pupils' lettering work used calligraphy and extensive use of Roman capitals, such as those on Trajan's Column. Johnston wrote that "The Roman capitals have held the supreme place among letters for readableness and beauty. They are the best forms for the grandest and most important inscriptions." Delf Smith shared this style, naming his workshop the Roman Lettering Company and commenting that Roman lettering has "content and atmosphere, and good examples convey a sense of stability and satisfaction", although his textbooks showed a wide range of styles and work by other artists and in other writing systems.

== First World War ==
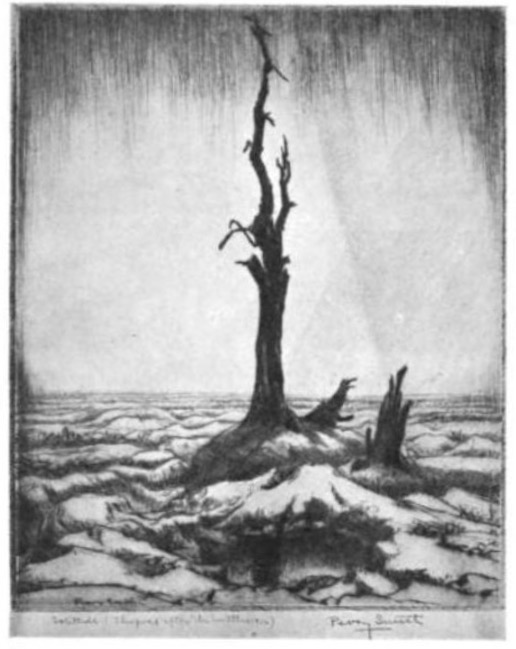
"Solitude (Thiepval after the Battles, 1916)"

During the First World War, Delf Smith enlisted in the Royal Marines as a volunteer, serving on the Western Front in France. In his early thirties, he was older than most men serving. A lot of his war service was spent digging trenches behind the front lines, at one point coming under bombardment, seeing four men killed and six wounded nearby.

Delf Smith as a serving soldier and not an official War Artist was several times reprimanded for drawing because of security concerns, although he received more freedom to carry out art over time through making connections with other soldiers. Finding sketching unsatisfying, he requested that his parents send him some copper plates and he created drypoint engravings of the war around Thiepval before and after being invalided out from France in June 1917. (Note: The Imperial War Museum article is published without a credited author but was written by Dr. Stacey Clapperton.) After his set of realistic depictions of the battlefield, he created a later series of seven prints, Dance of Death, updating the medieval imagery of the dance of death to the war:

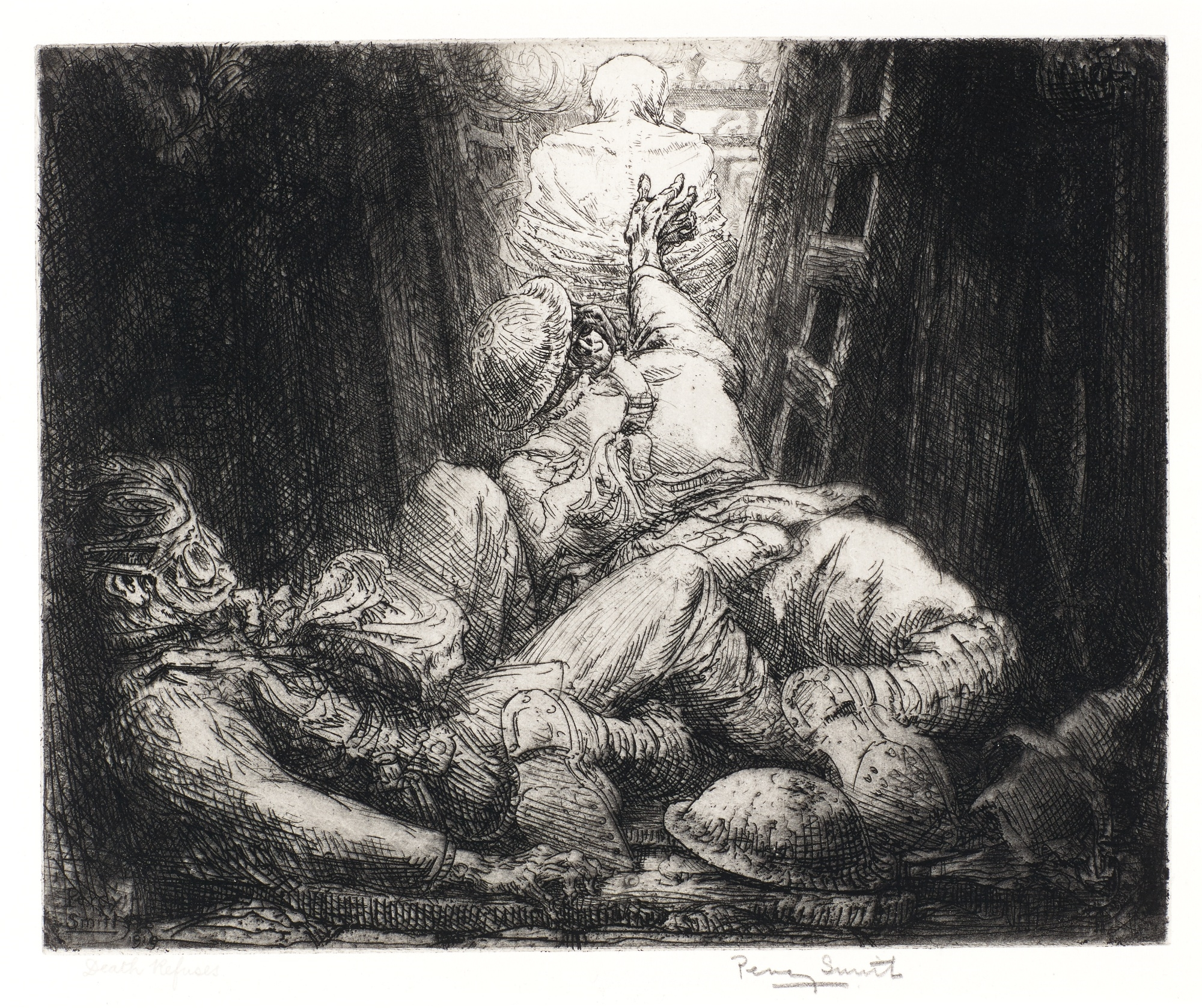
"Death Refuses"

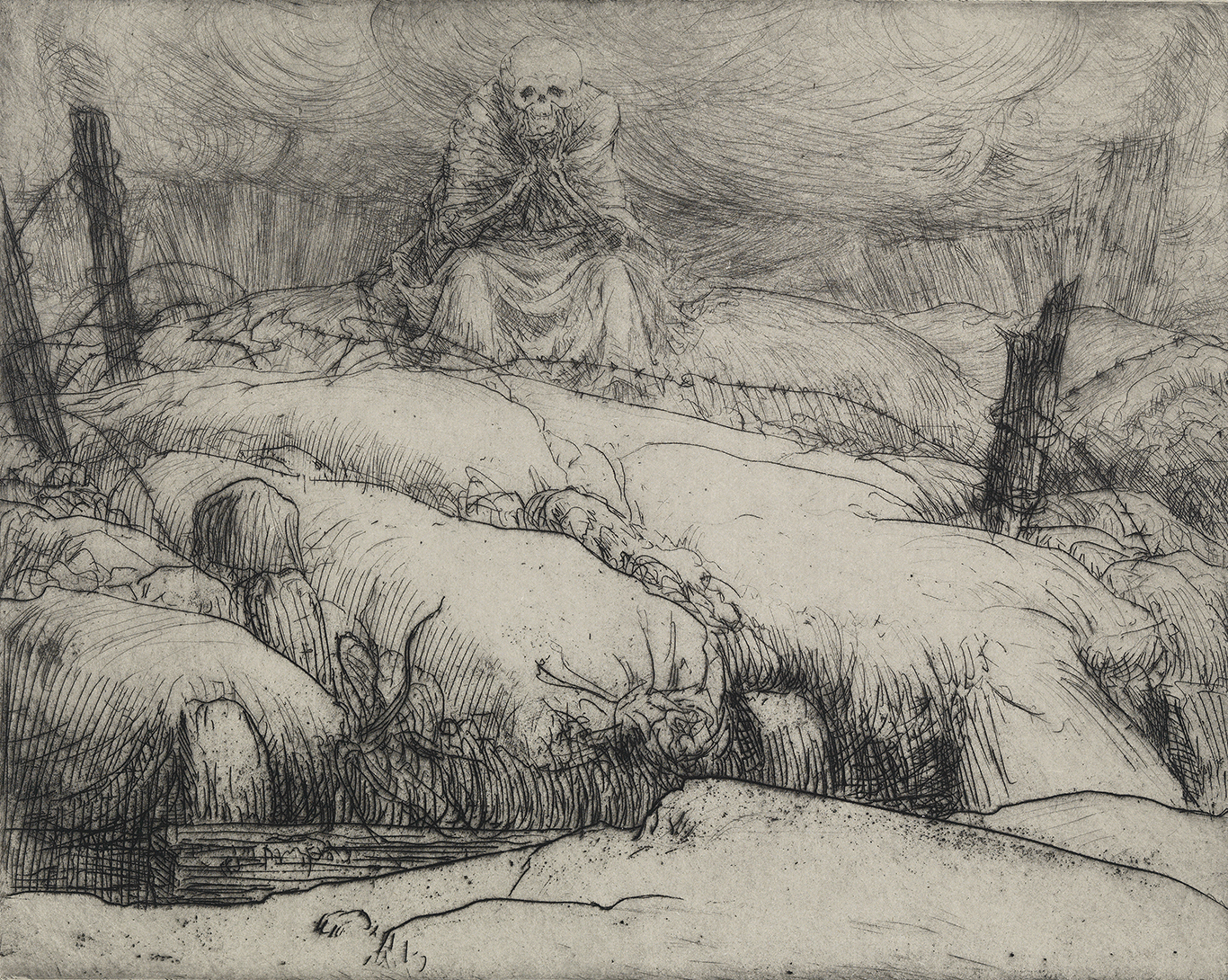
"Death Waits"

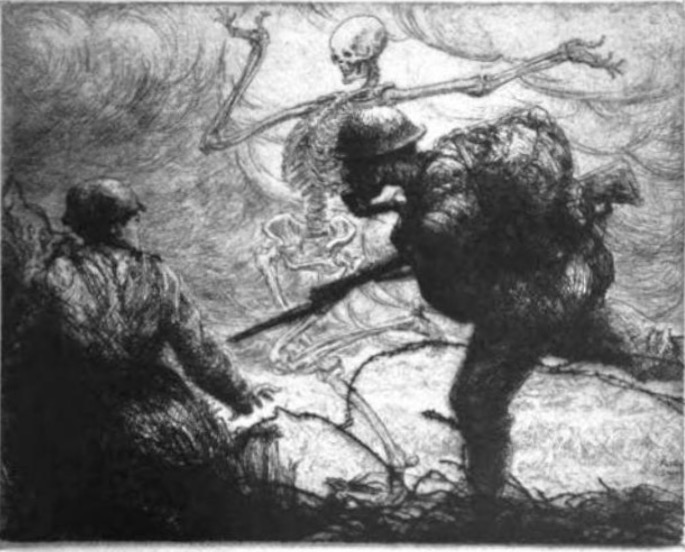
"Death Intoxicated"

== Career in London ==
After the war, Delf Smith returned to London, where he worked as a designer and artist through his company, the Dorno Workshop and Studio (earlier Dorian Workshop and Studio), creating and executing designs for clients including The Sunday Times, the National Museum of Wales, King's College London, Southampton Civic Centre, the BBC, the Boy Scouts Association and London Transport. He also worked as a book designer. Reading Wuthering Heights had a strong effect on him and he created several sets of art inspired by it.

In 1928 he married botanist Ellen Marion Delf, both from then on using the name Delf Smith. His wife's friend Margaret T. Martin described it as "the happiest of marriages". One of his assistants was William Sharpington, who later established his own successful studio.

One of his last projects was two war memorial panels for the Free Church, Hampstead Garden Suburb.

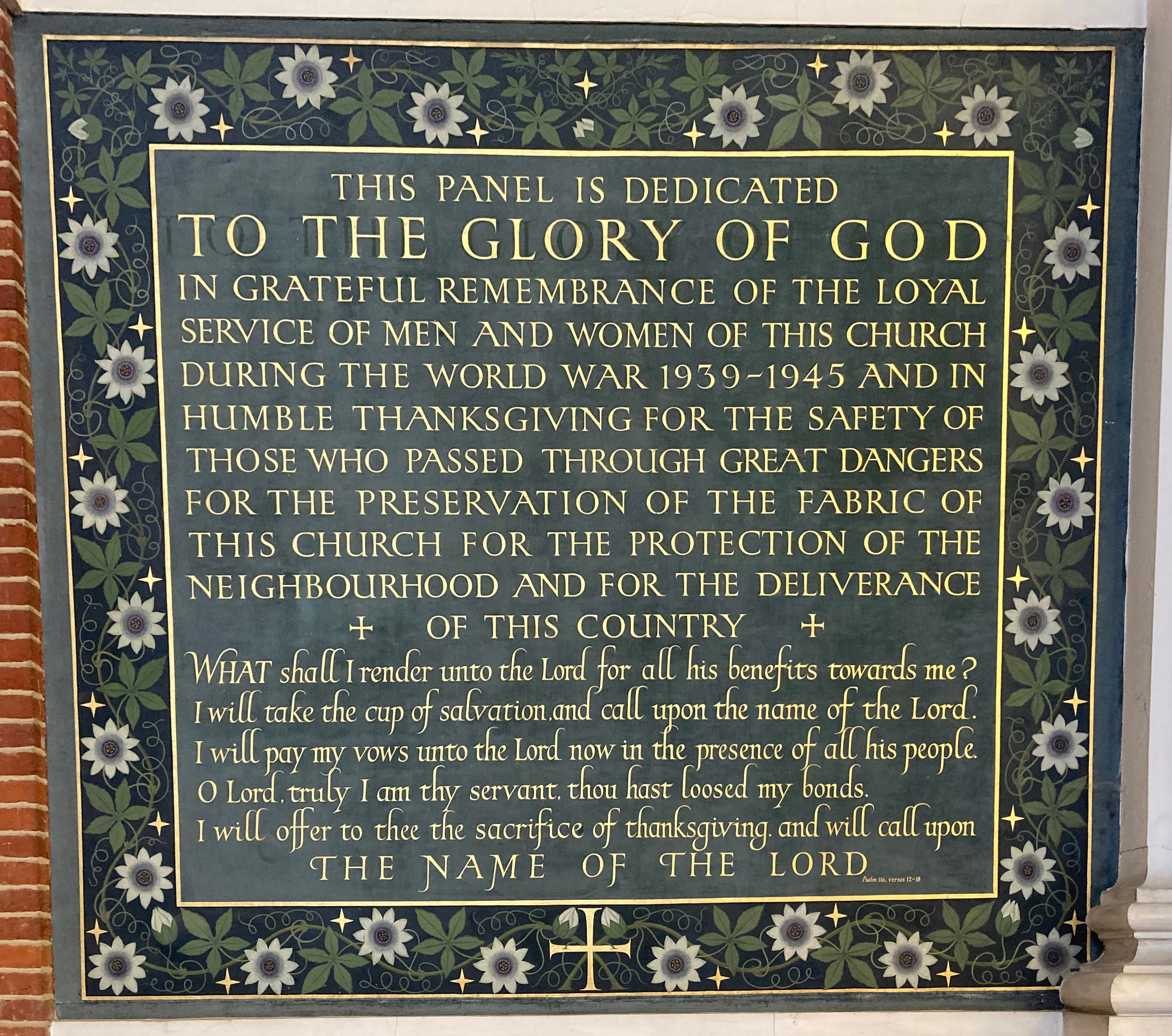

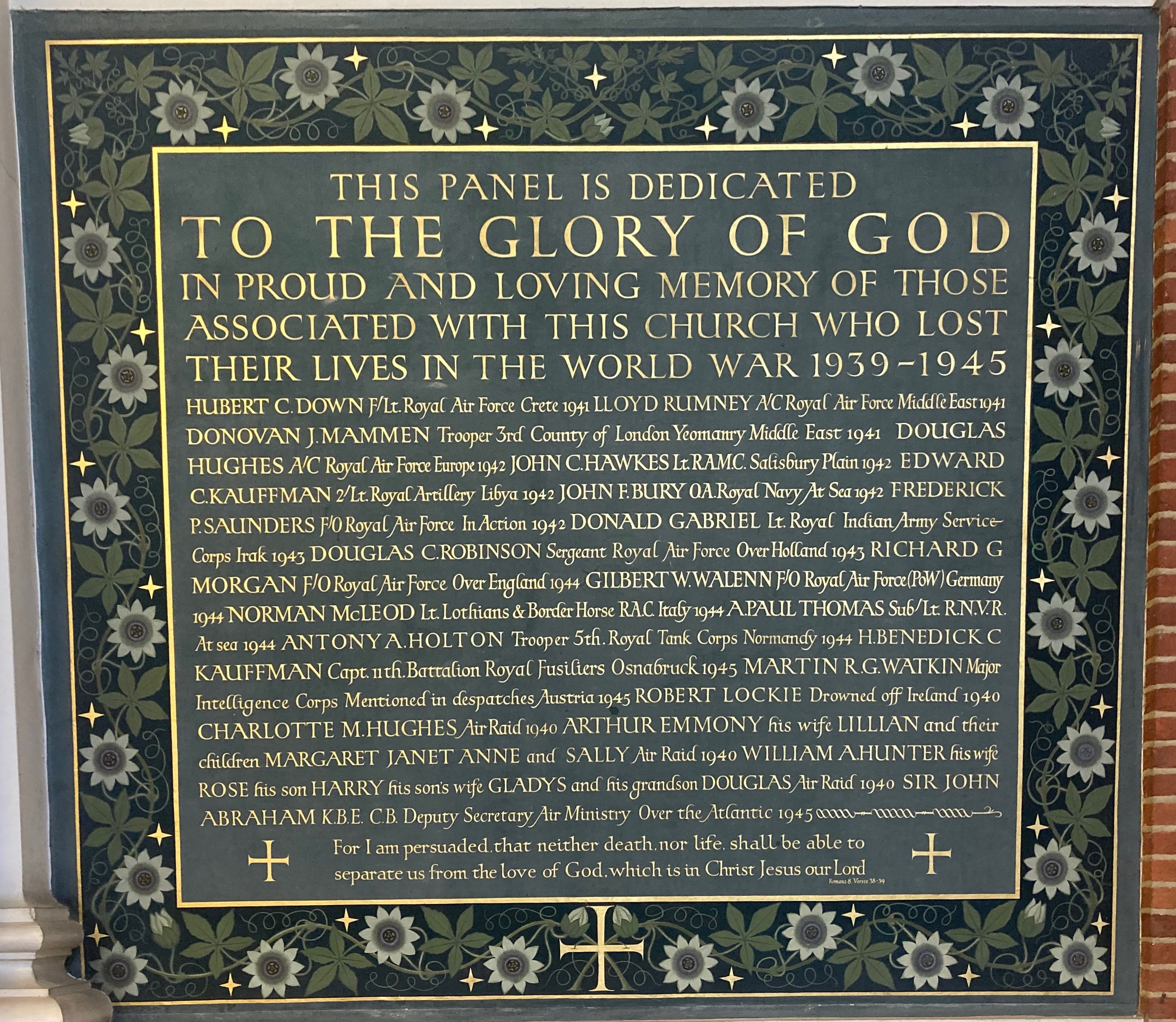

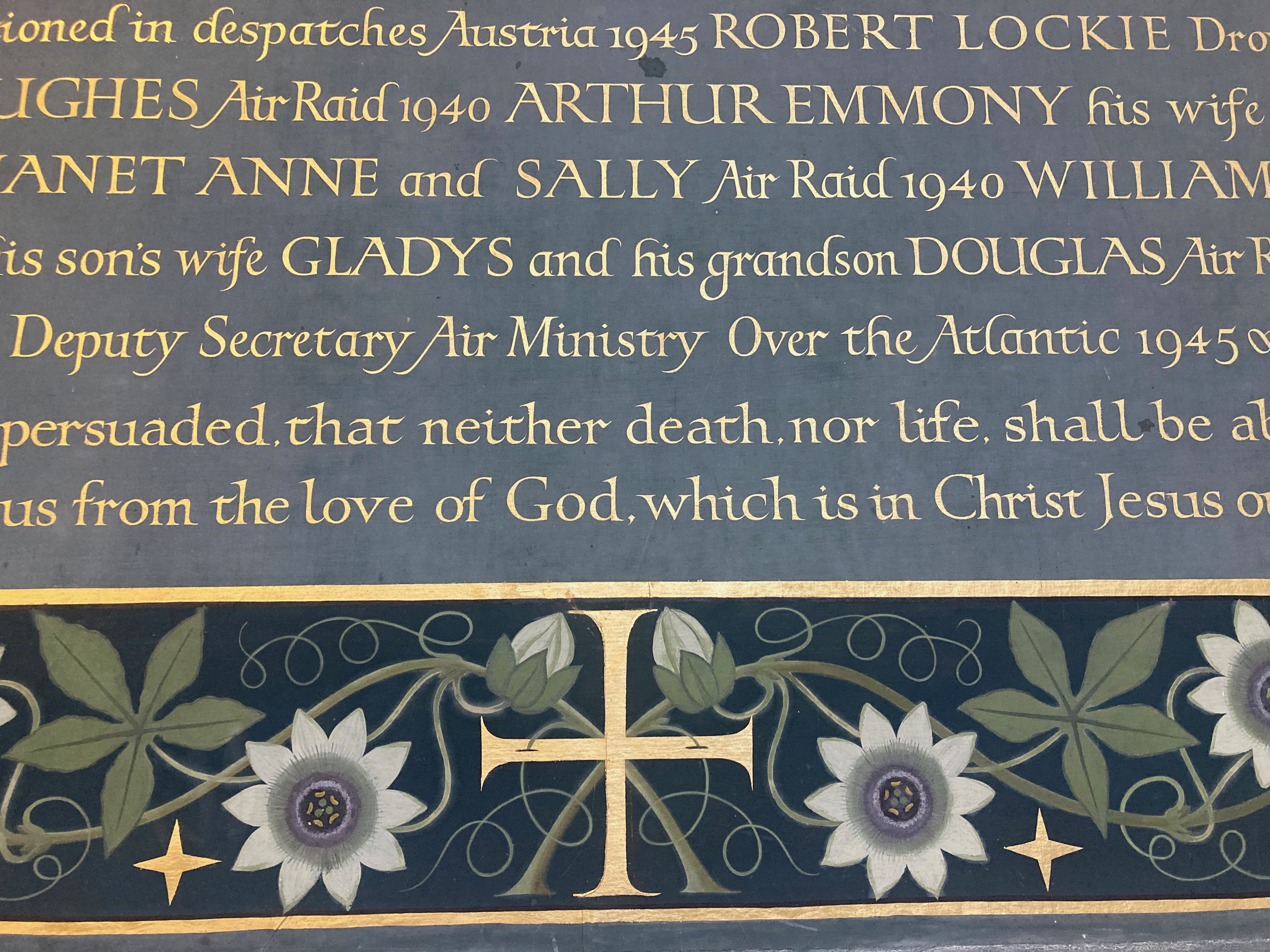

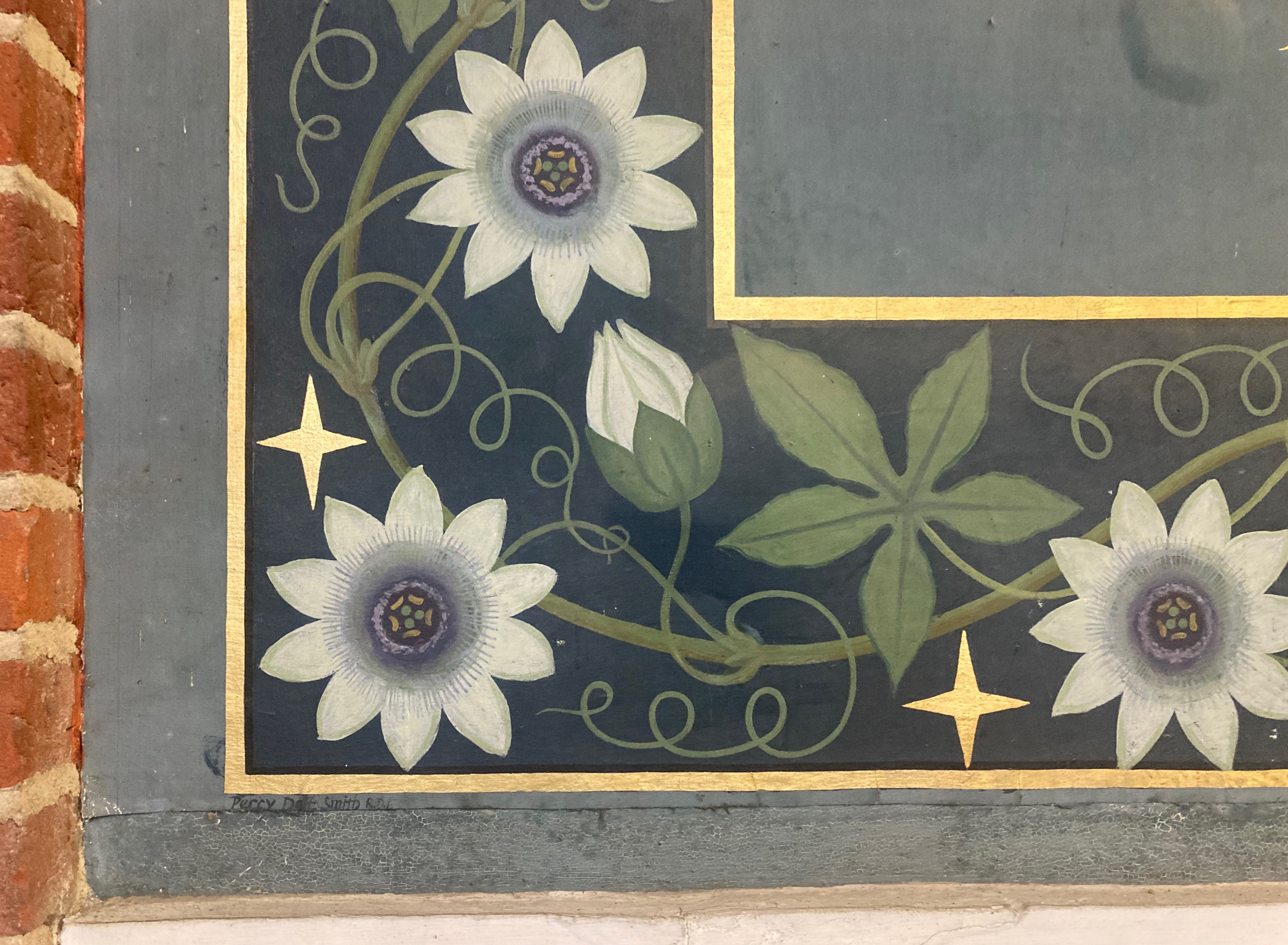

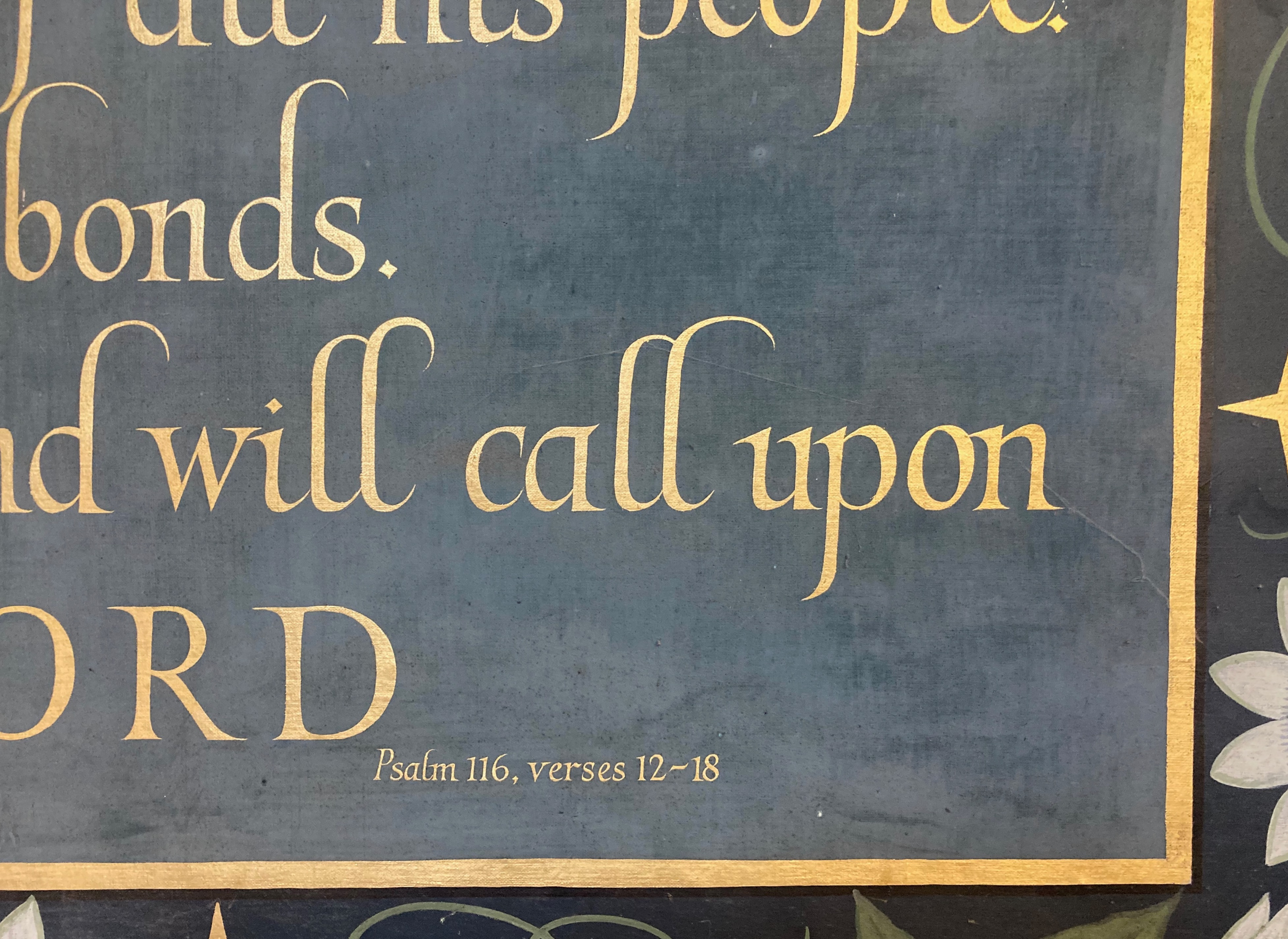

Delf Smith believed strongly in the artistic value of lettering, and wrote several books and lectures teaching the topic. Shown are some lettering models from his book Civic and Memorial Lettering (1946):

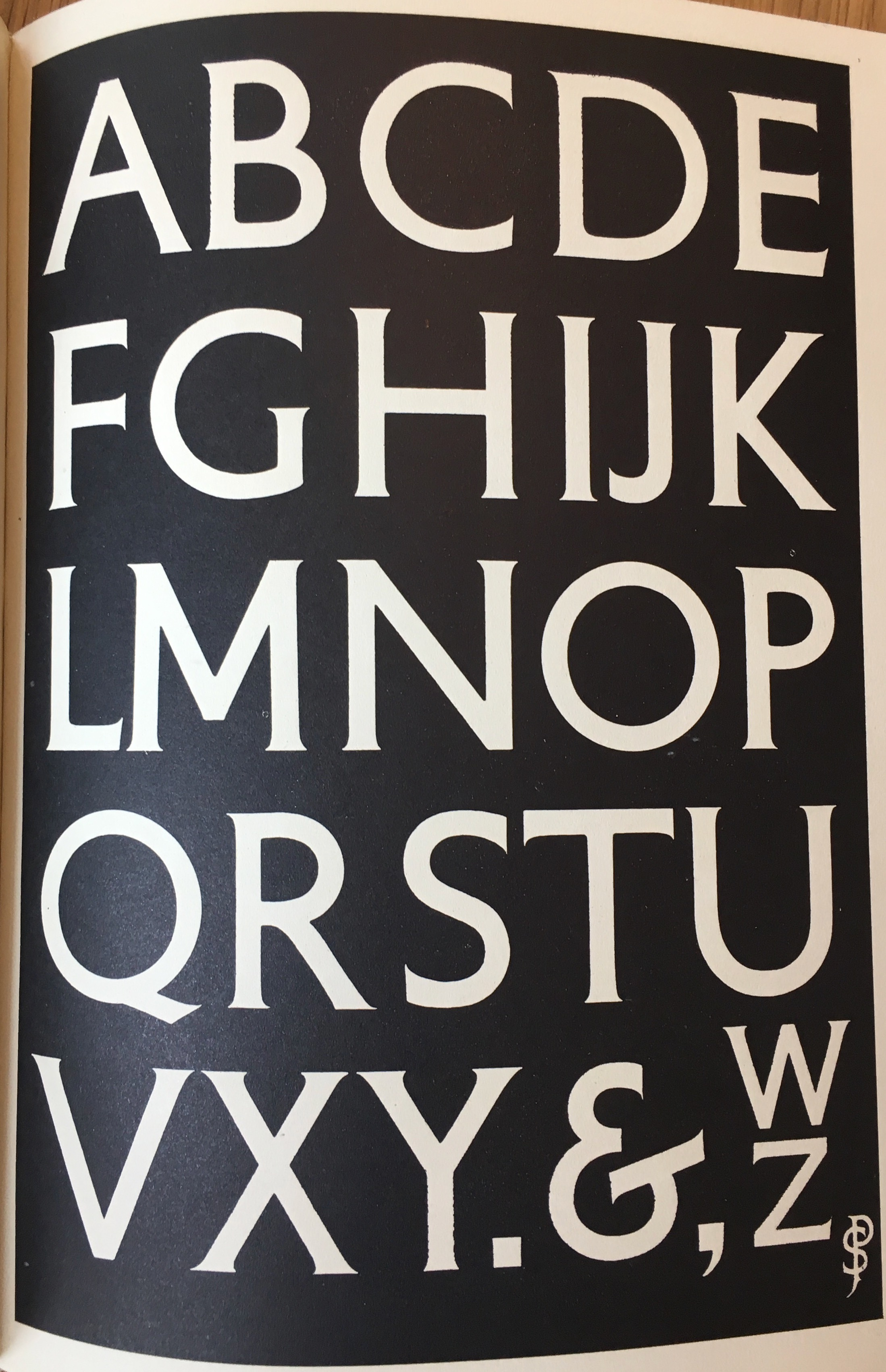
Petit-serif alphabet for London Transport

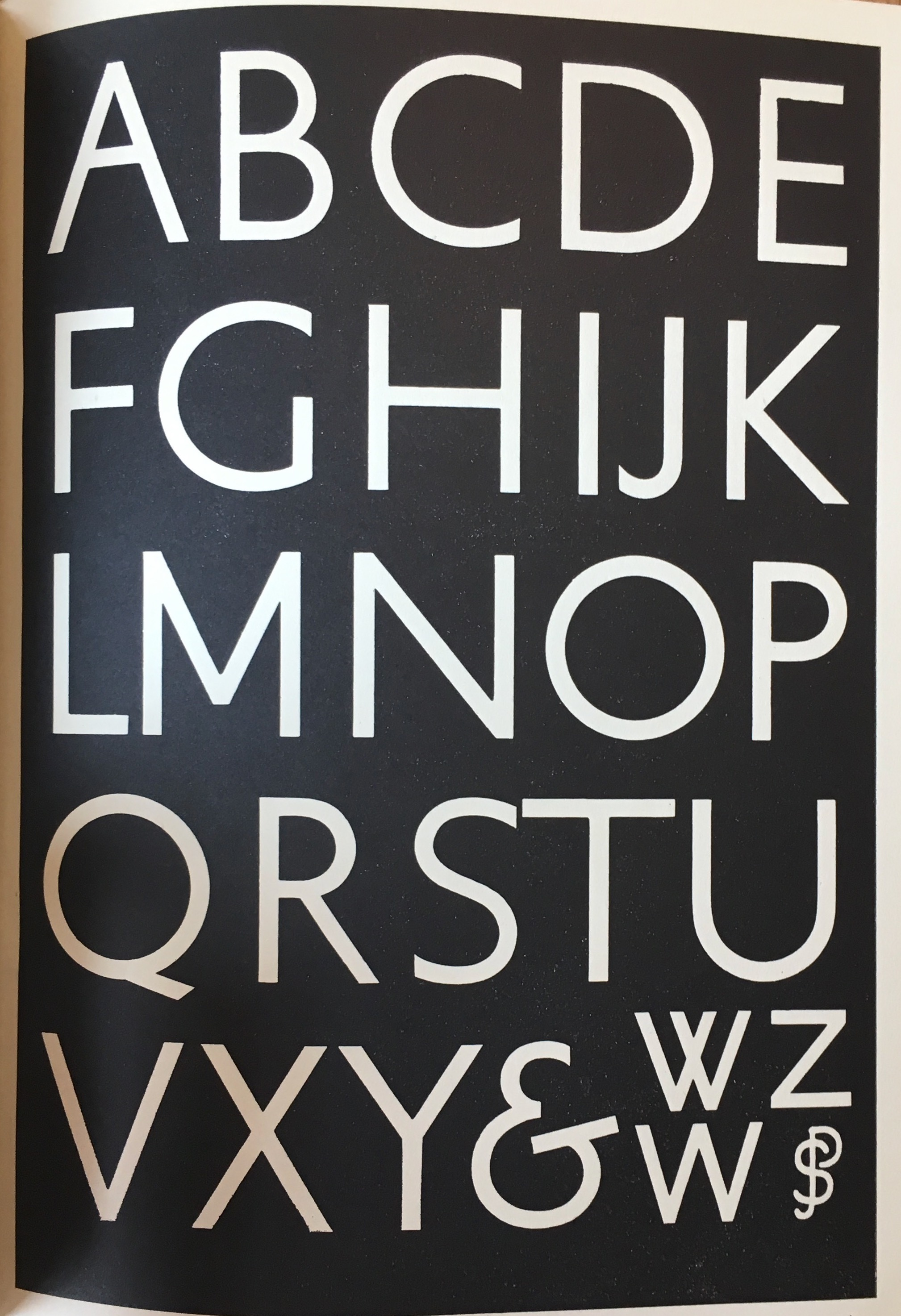
Sans-serif capital alphabet

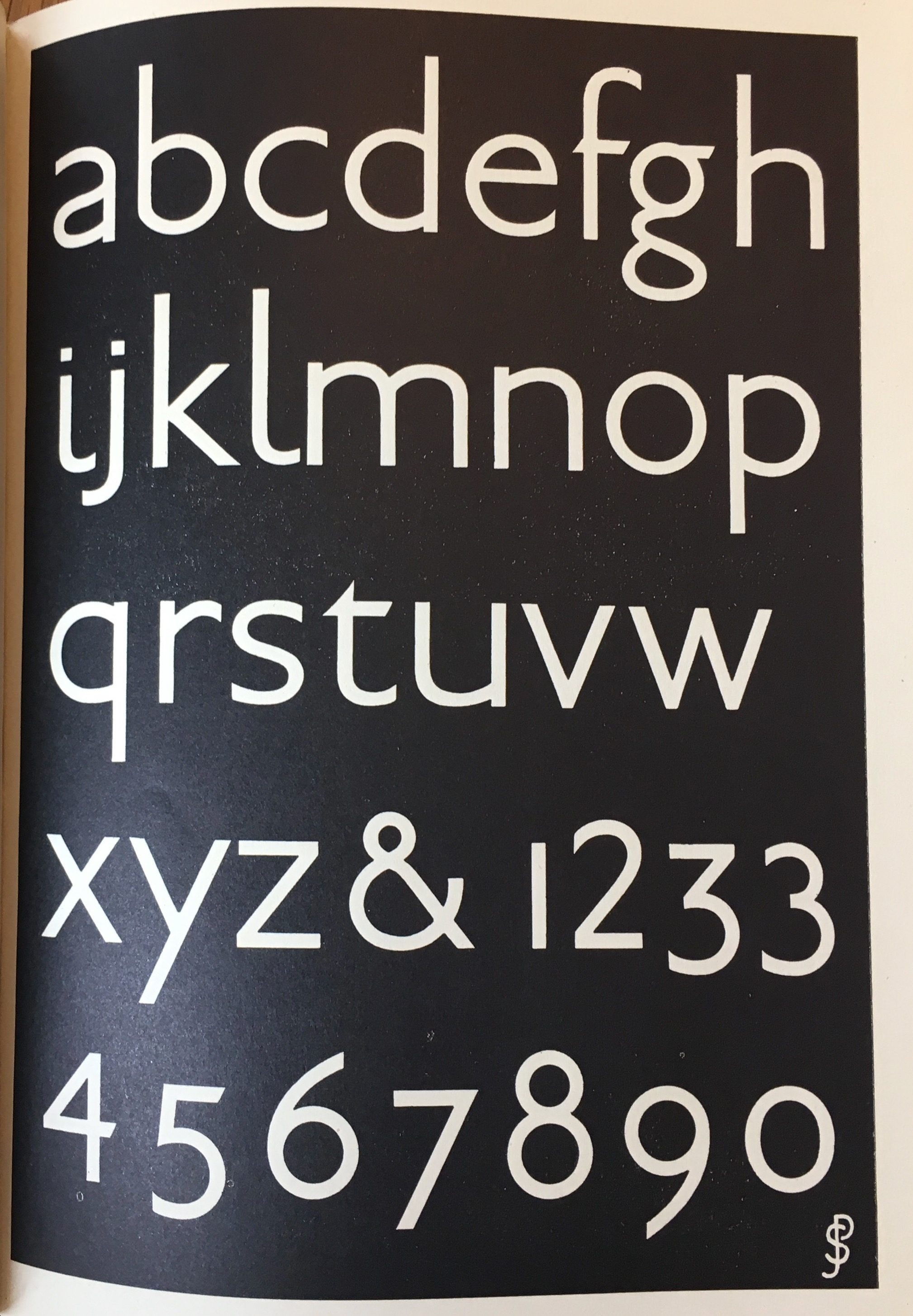
Sans-serif lower case alphabet

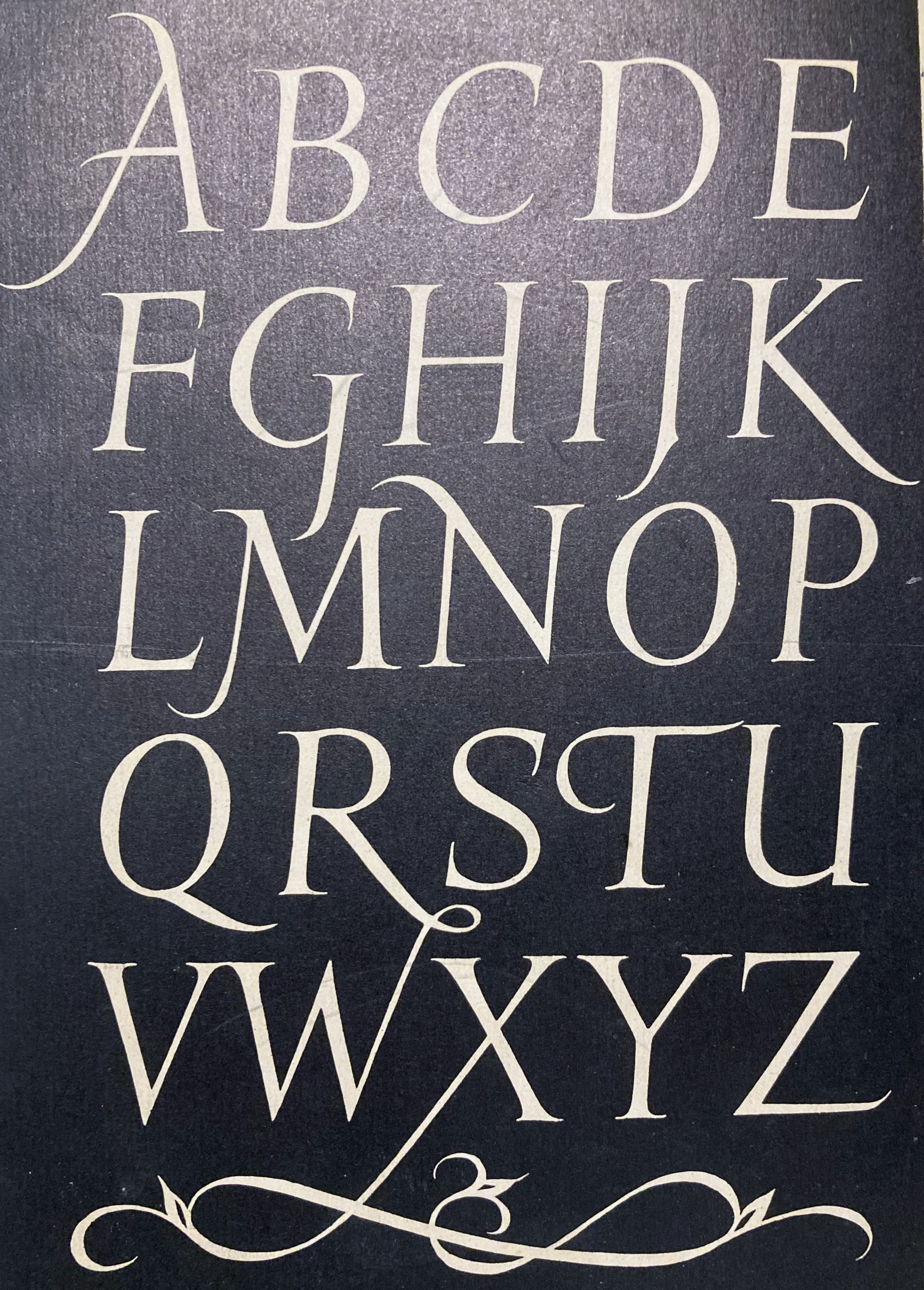
Italic upper case

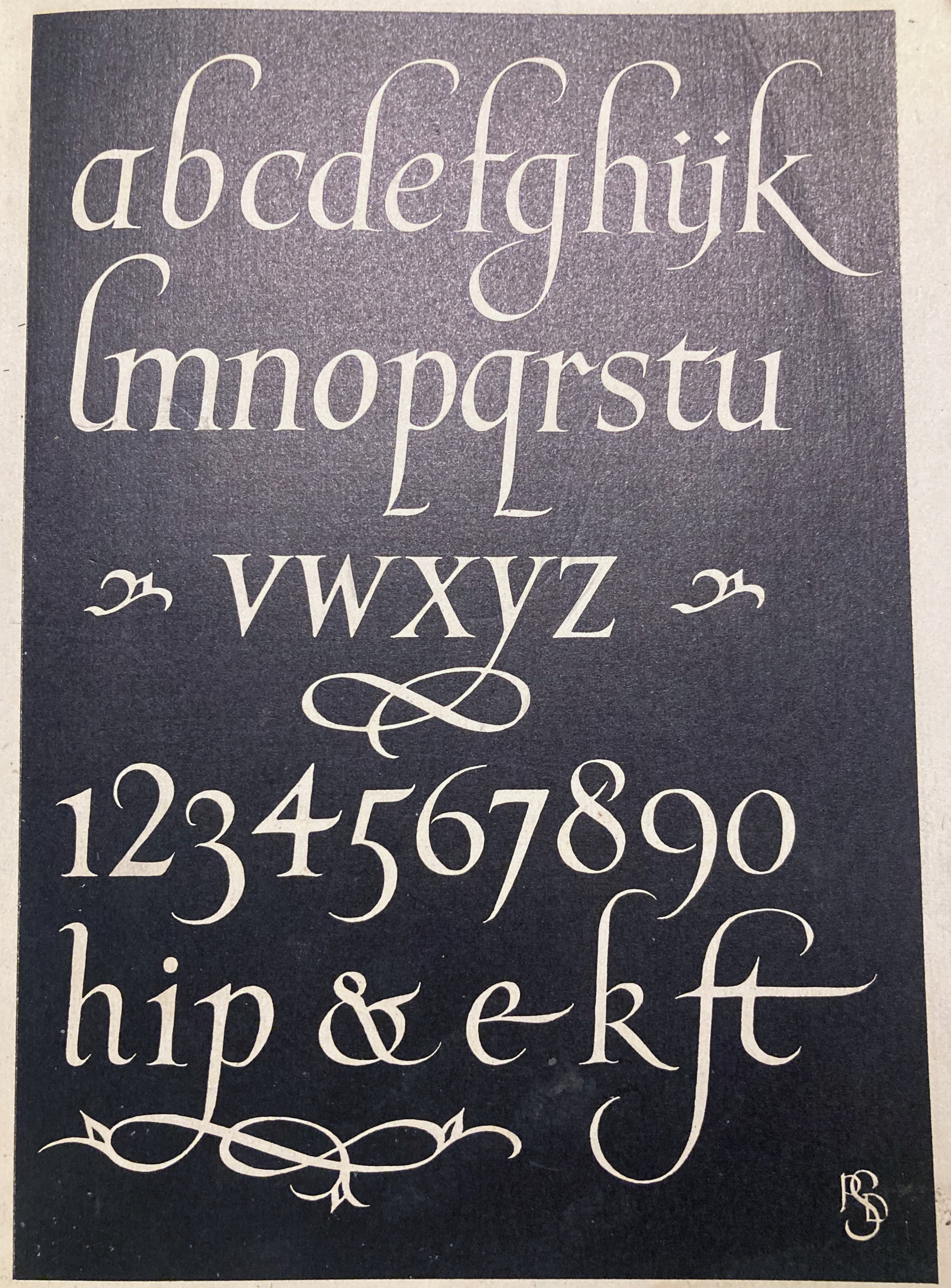
Italic lower case

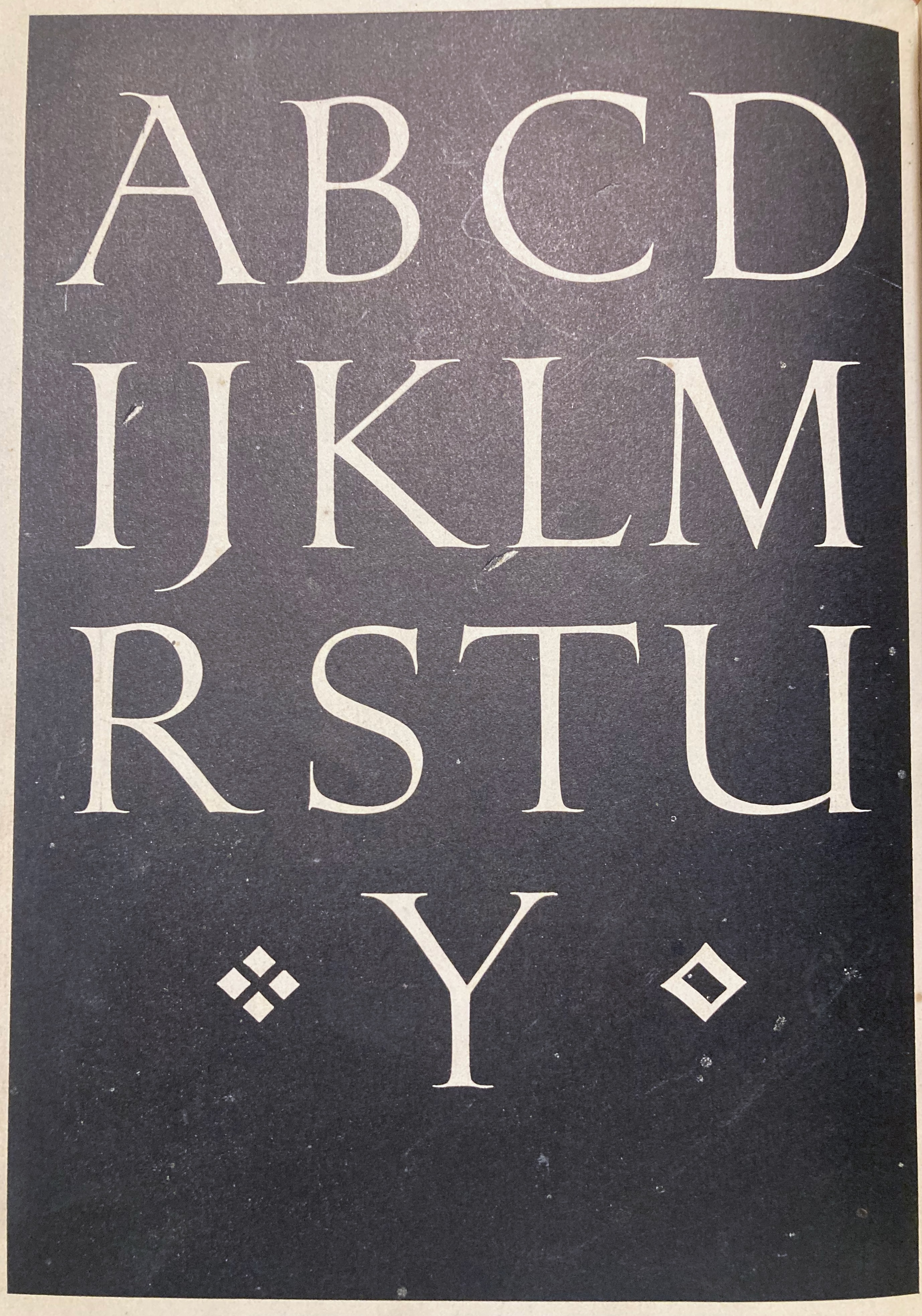
Roman capitals

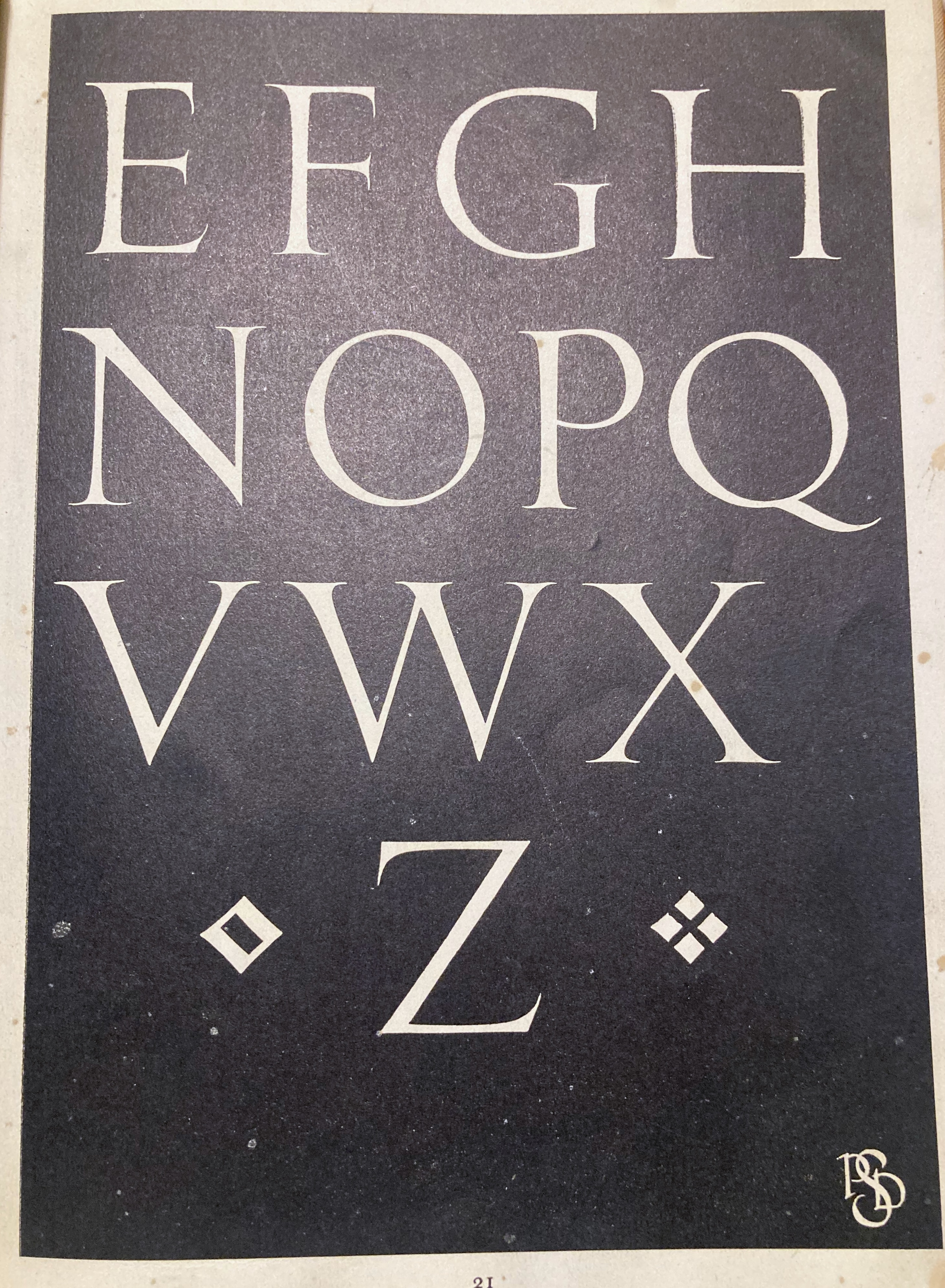
Roman capitals

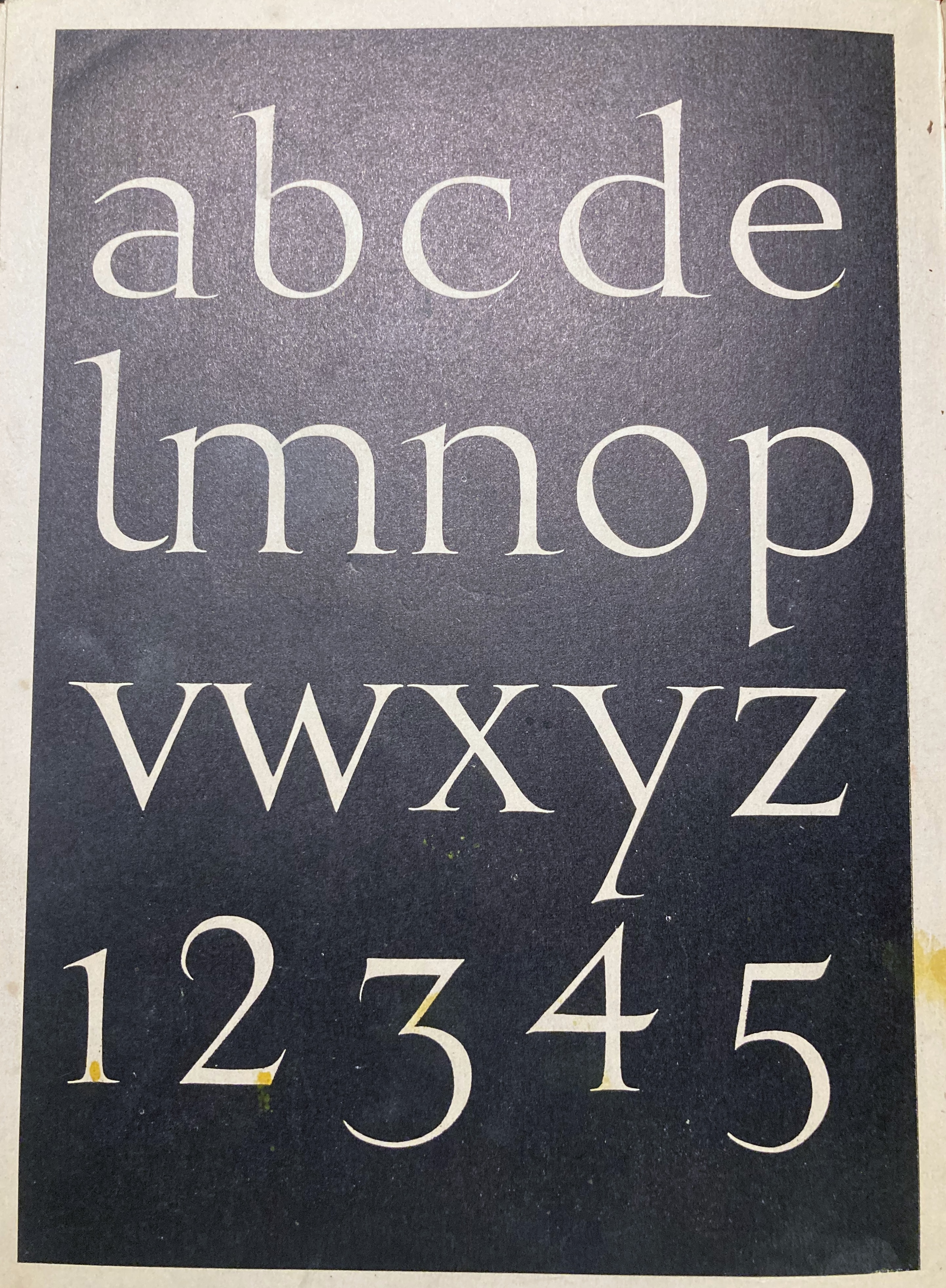
Lower case

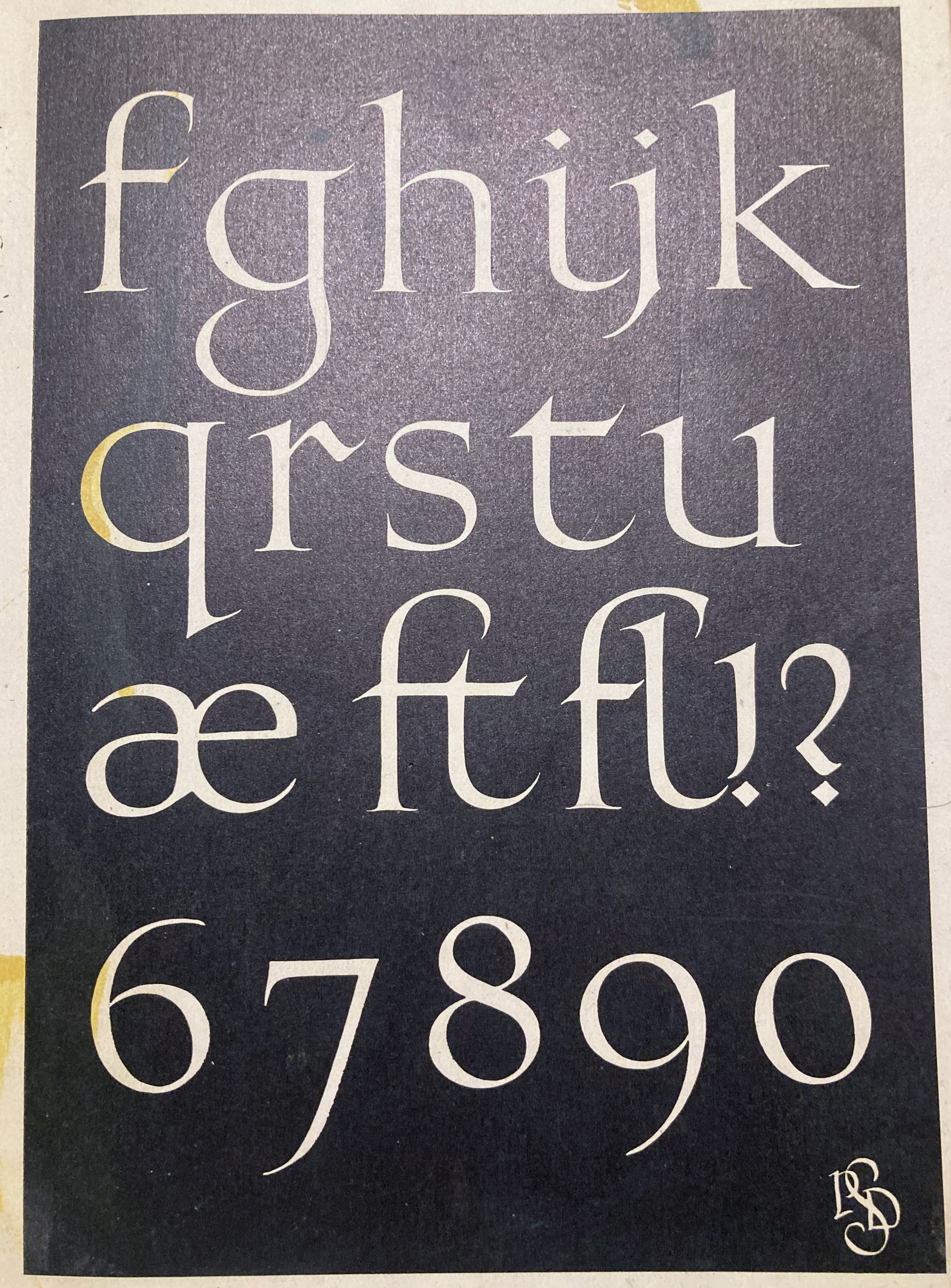
Lower case

Shown are some designs created by Delf Smith's workshop:

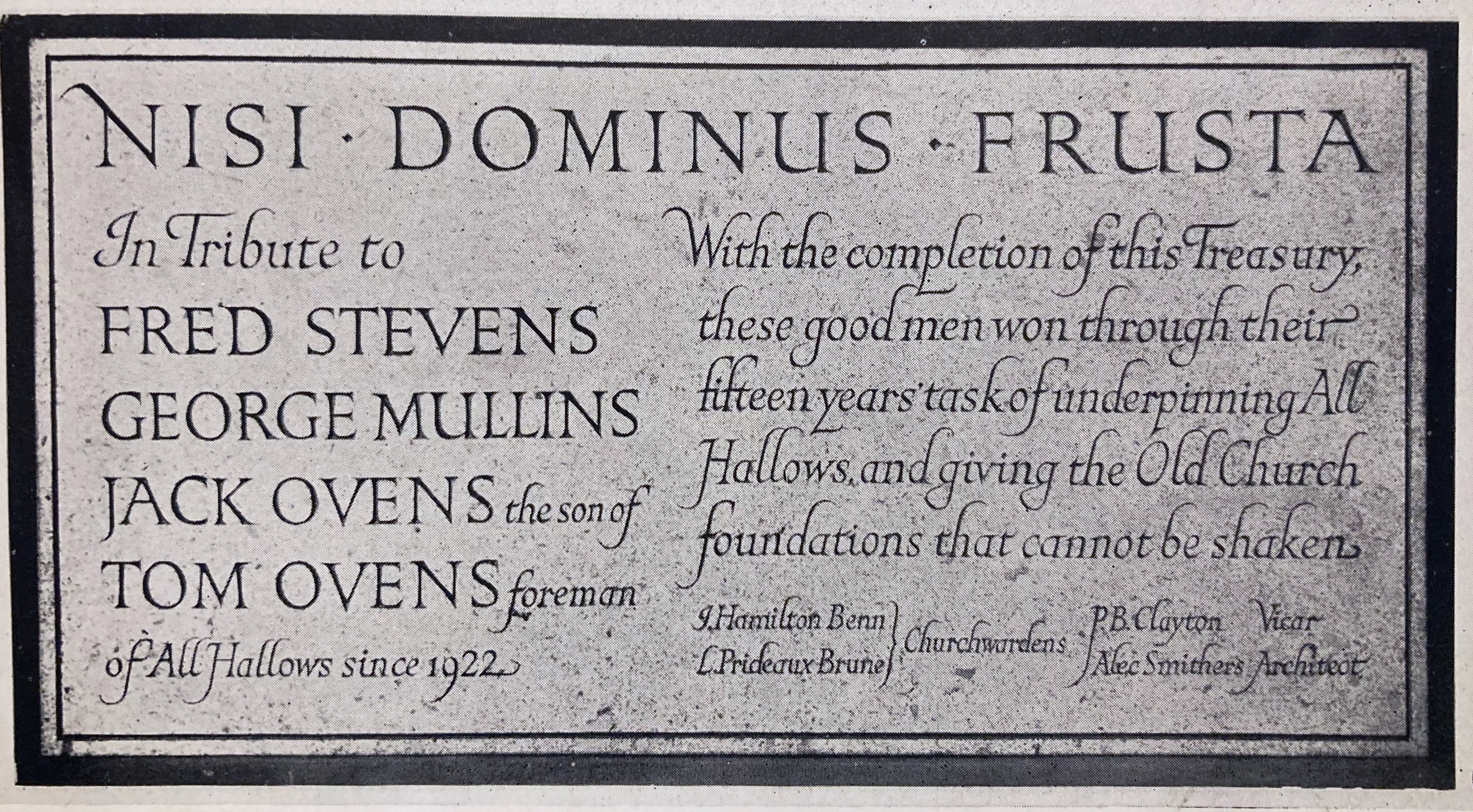
Plaque for All Hallows Church

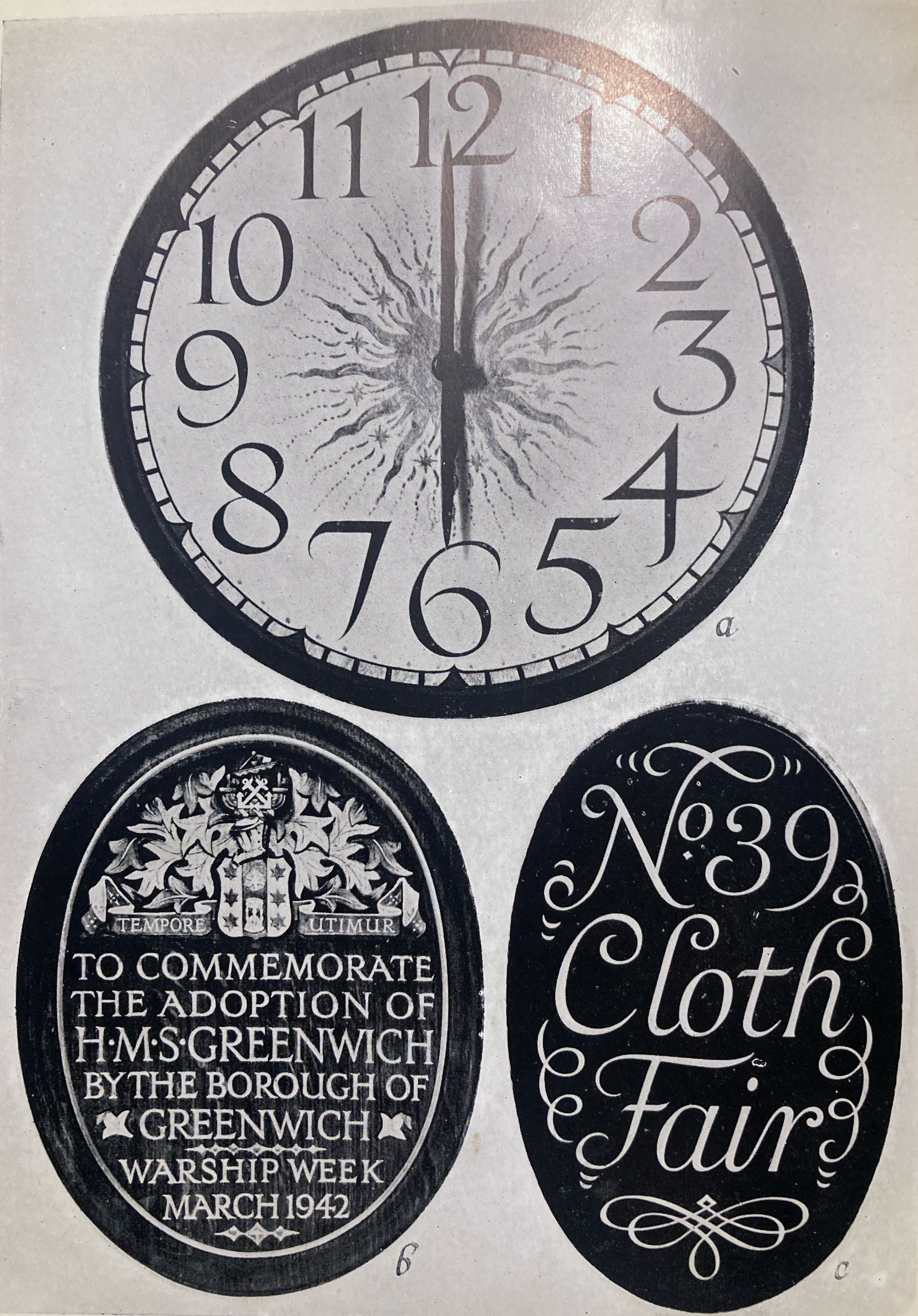
Clock dial, plaque for Warship Week

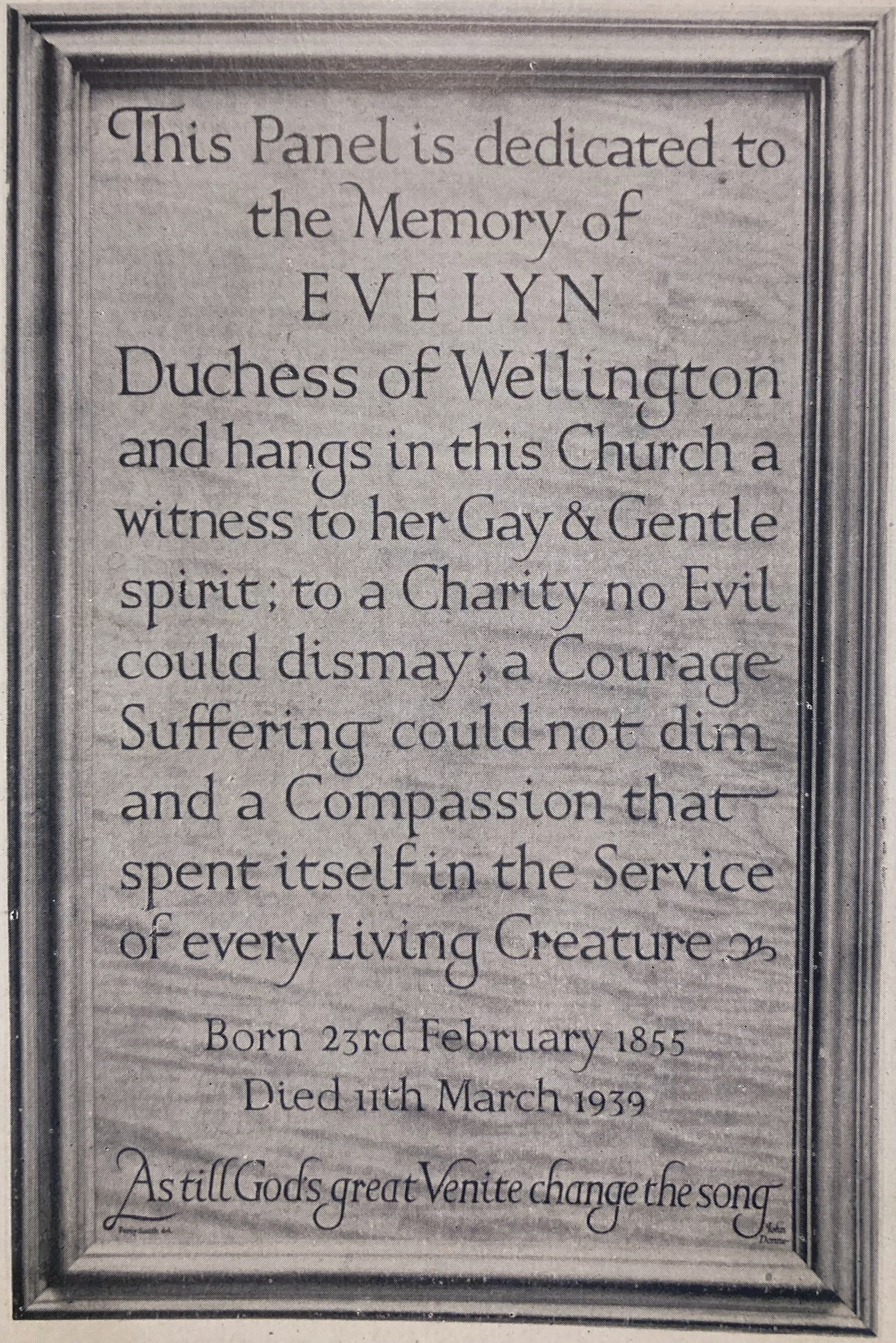
Plaque commemorating Evelyn, Duchess of Wellington

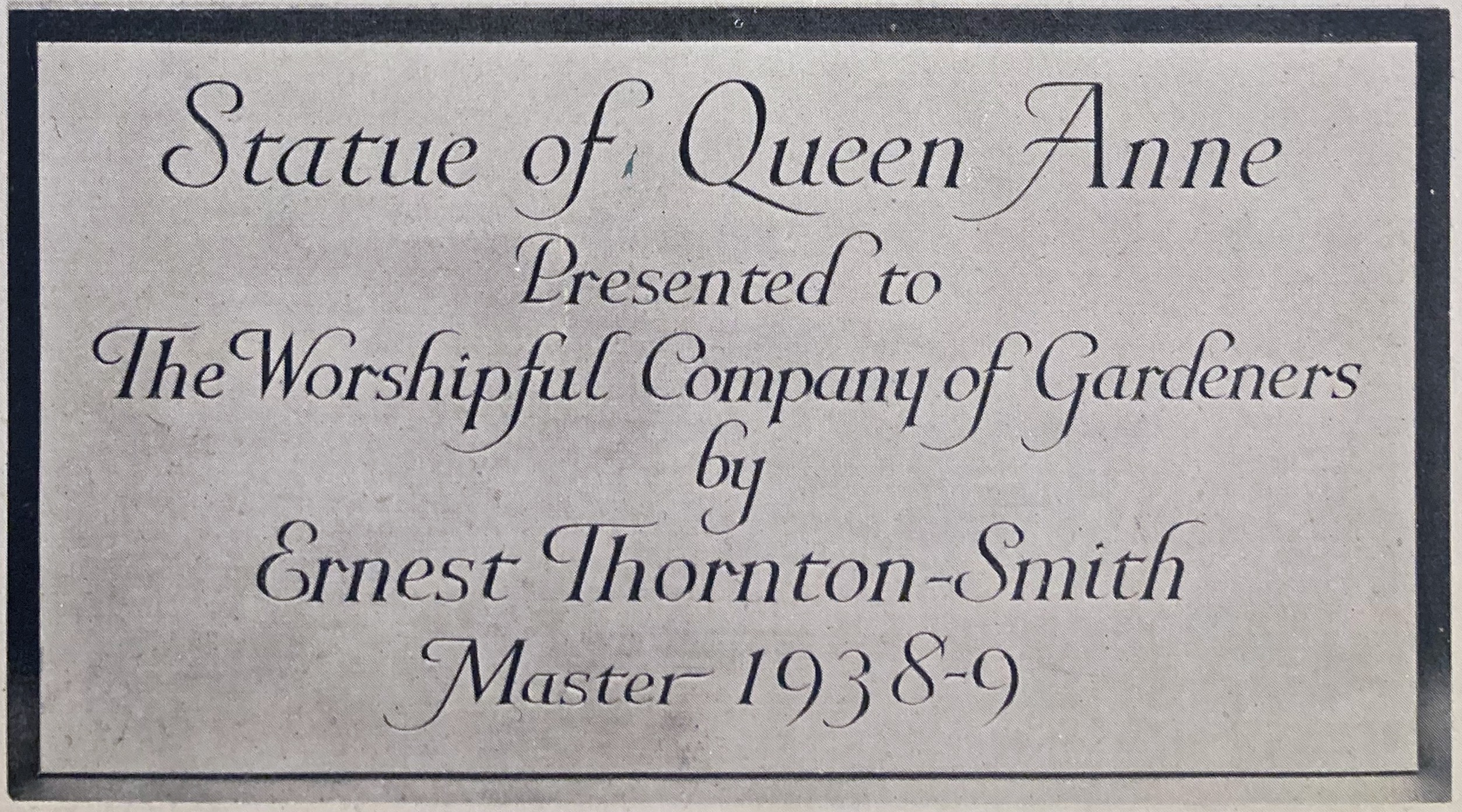
Plaque for the Worshipful Company of Gardeners

Mads Wildgaard's font family, Tradition is based on his lettering. (Note: According to its tags list on MyFonts, Neil Summerour's Kurosawa Serif and Kurosawa Hand typefaces are also influenced by Delf Smith's work. Various other typefaces have been published based on the Roman capitals-led style of Arts and Crafts lettering Delf Smith practiced but not specifically based on his work, see e.g. the following.) For the LPTB he designed variant of its corporate Johnston typeface with serifs for its 55 Broadway headquarters. The same design was also used at some stations, especially Sudbury Town and Arnos Grove. Several digitisations of it have been published, and one made privately for Transport for London. Delf Smith's drawings are now at St Bride Library.

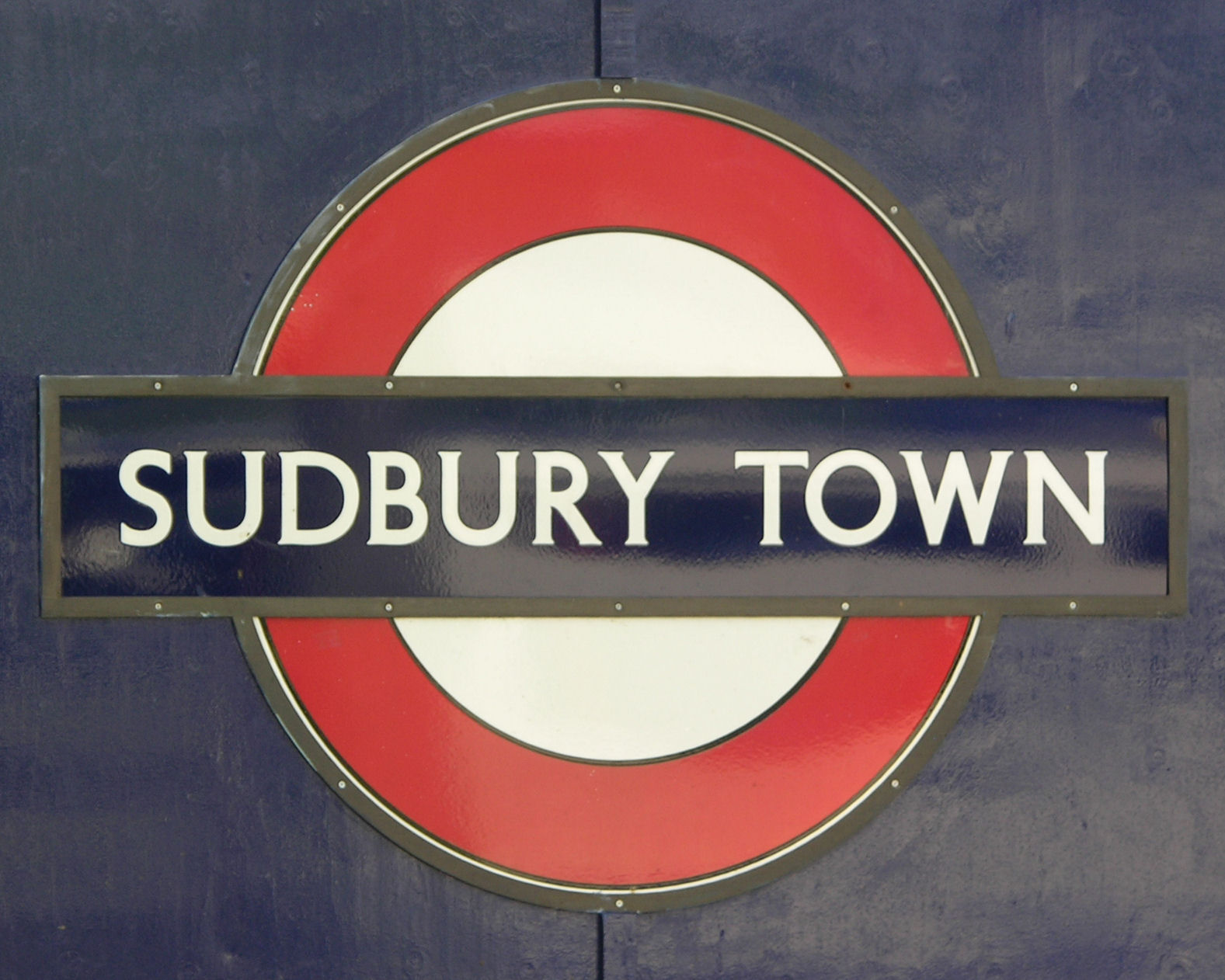
Roundel at Sudbury Town station

Delf Smith became a Royal Designer for Industry for lettering in 1940 and in 1941 he was elected Master of the Art Workers' Guild. He died in 1948.
