= Delft jewelry =

Jewelry featuring Delftware medallions

Delft Jewelry is the generic name for jewelry featuring Dutch (Netherlands) miniature Delftware medallions or brooch panels in a silver setting. Delft jewelry includes necklaces, pendants, earrings, brooches, bracelets, rings, and cufflinks. The Delft panels are usually made of pottery and decorated with a blue and white windmill landscape. The silver setting often has the form of silver filigree. Delft jewelry has been made in the Netherlands since c.1879. It flourished especially in the decades after WW2 as a result of demand from the Dutch tourist industry. That era saw the emergence of three specialist producers of Delft medallions. For most other Delftware factories however, brooch panels have been a relatively small side product.

The main producers of Delft brooch panels as a side product have been:

- De Koninklijke Porceleyne Fles, Delft
- Plateelbakkerij Delft, Amsterdam/Hilversum
- Plateelbakkerij Schoonhoven, Schoonhoven
- Plateelbakkerij en Pijpenfabrieken Zenith, Gouda
- Goedewaagen's Hollandse Pijpen- en Aardewerkfabrieken, Gouda

The main specialist producers of Delft brooch panels have been:

- Atelier Van Katwijk, Gouda - established in 1946 by Frans van Katwijk
- Keramiekatelier C.Verwoerd, Gouda - established in 1949 by Cornelis Verwoerd
- Kunstatelier Porceletti, Gouda - established in c.1955 by Dick Olthuysen

Delft brooch panels are usually set in silver. The emergence of specialist producers of Delft jewelry in Gouda, Netherlands, was greatly helped by the presence of an important silversmithing community in the nearby town of Schoonhoven. Zenith Gouda and Goedewaagen Gouda have been suppliers of Delft medallions to silversmith H. Hooykaas of Schoonhoven. Van Katwijk, Verwoerd, and Porceletti have been suppliers of Delft brooch panels to silversmith G.J. Van den Bergh Jr. Several other Schoonhoven silversmiths have been involved in the production of Delft jewelry as well.

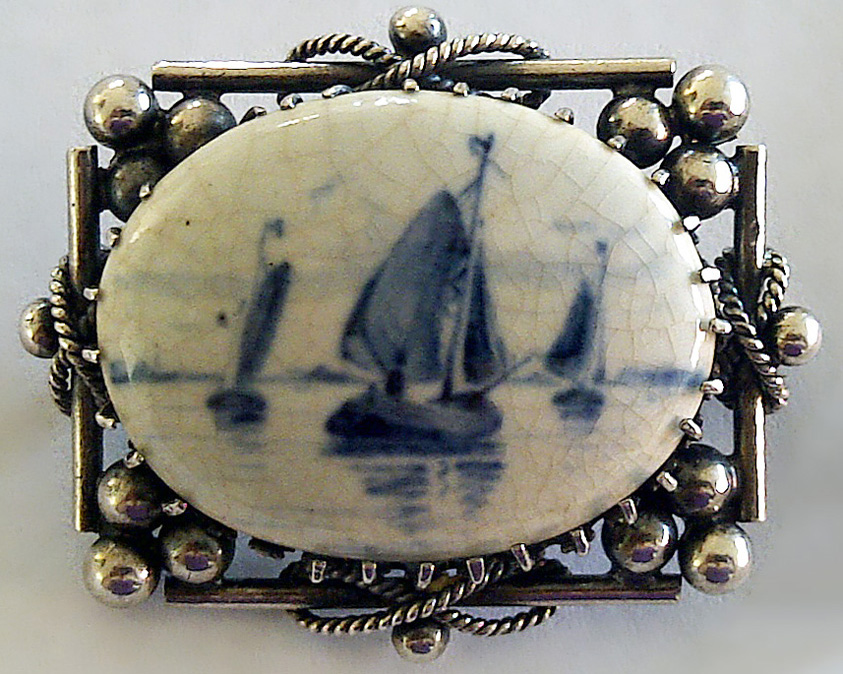
Ships brooch by De Porceleyne Fles 1892

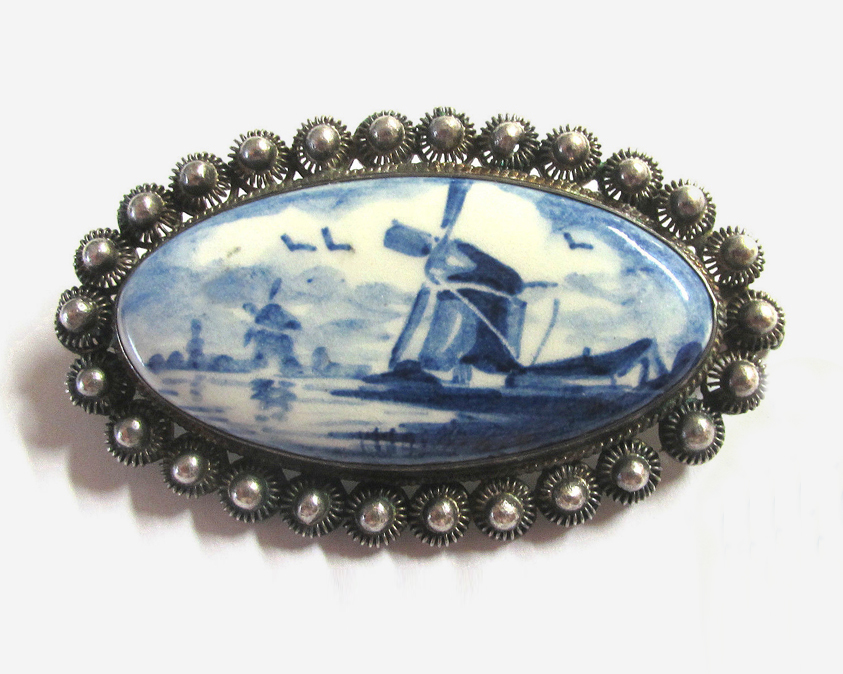
Windmill brooch by Zenith Gouda c.1939

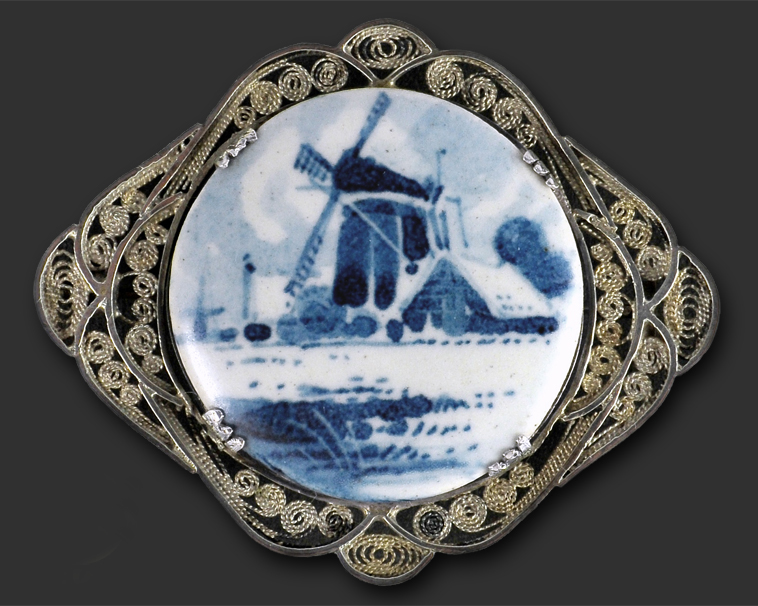
Winter windmill brooch by PB Schoonhoven c.1946

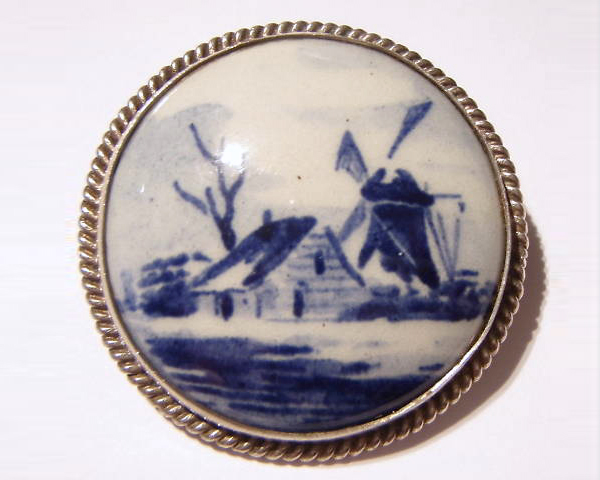
Winter windmill brooch by Van Katwijk c.1950

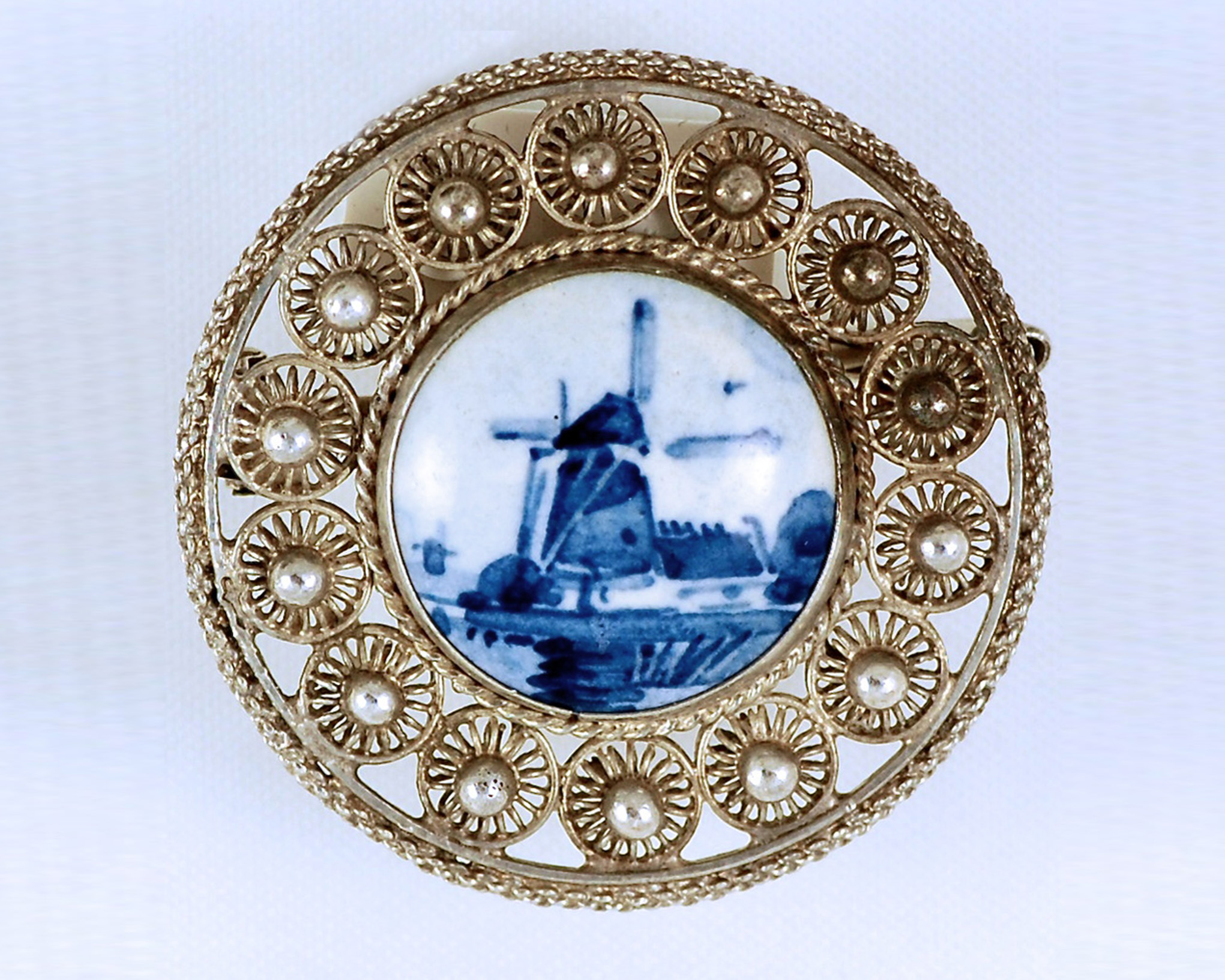
Windmill brooch by Verwoerd c.1950

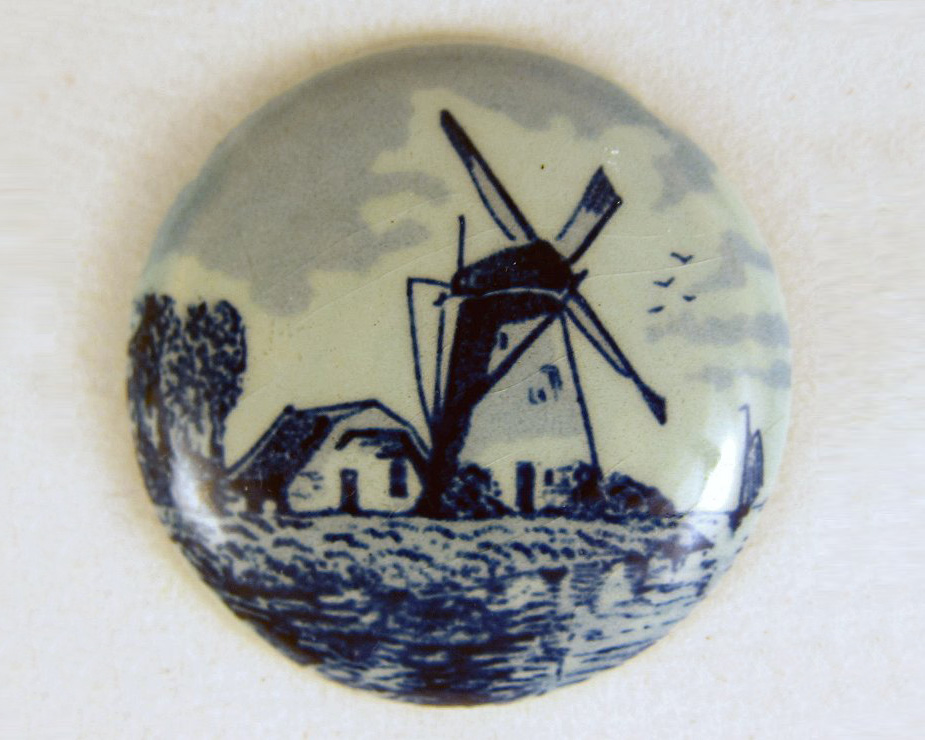
Transfer printed brooch panel by Porceletti c.1960-2001
