= Deft =

Deft may refer to:

- Deft (gamer) (born 1996), League of Legends player
- USS Deft (AM-216), an Admirable-class minesweeper
- Deft (company)

== Distinguish from ==
- Delft
