= Len Delfs =

Australian rules footballer

Leonard Raymond Delfs

Personal information
- Full name: Leonard Raymond Delfs
- Born: 4 May 1920
- Died: 8 April 1973 (aged 52)
- Original team: South Fremantle
- Height: 168 cm (5 ft 6 in)
- Weight: 68 kg (150 lb)

Playing career^{1}
Years	Club	Games (Goals)
1942	South Melbourne	5 (5)
- ^{1} Playing statistics correct to the end of 1942.

Leonard Raymond Delfs (4 May 1920 – 8 April 1973) was an Australian rules footballer who played with South Melbourne in the Victorian Football League (VFL).
