= Marion Delf-Smith =

British botanist (1883–1980)

- Born: Ellen Marion Delf; 31 January 1883
- Died: 23 February 1980 (aged 97)
- Education: Girton College, Cambridge
- Occupation: Botanist
- Spouse: Percy Delf Smith

Ellen Marion Delf-Smith FLS (née Delf, 31 January 1883 – 23 February 1980) was a British botanist.

== Biography ==
Ellen Marion Delf was born to Thomas William Herbert Delf, a secretary, and Catherine Mary Delf (née Bridges) on 31 January 1883. She attended James Allen's Girls' School before studying natural sciences at Girton College, Cambridge. She studied there from 1902 to 1906, holding a Clothworkers' Scholarship, and gained first class marks in both parts of the tripos, specialising in botany.

After completing her studies at Cambridge Delf took up a post at Westfield College, University of London. She was tasked with setting up the teaching of botany at the college. Despite the college having no money for equipment or technicians and a poor collection of specimens, she managed to raise funds to better equip the laboratory. Her efforts led to the university approving the Westfield laboratory for preparing students for pass degree examinations in botany in 1910 and for honours degrees in 1915; moreover she was recognised as a teacher of the university in 1910. During the period from 1911 to 1916 she studied plant physiology, specifically transpiration. She gained her D.Sc. from London in 1912 and returned to Girton in 1914 as a research fellow.

Delf worked as a research assistant at the Lister Institute of Preventive Medicine from December 1916 to January 1920. Her studies concerned the vitamin content of foods, including military rations, research made necessary by the Mesopotamian campaign. In 1920 she held a temporary post investigating the nutrition, specifically the vitamin C content, of mine workers' diets in the area of Johannesburg, and as a result "their health was substantially improved". She also spent time in Cape Town studying marine algae.

In 1921 Delf returned to Westfield as a lecturer in botany and stayed there for the rest of her career. She became head of the botany department in 1939 and managed its relocation to Oxford during the Second World War. She retired in 1948 but continued working at Westfield as a garden steward. Later she served on the council and from the 1950 to 1955 was the president of the alumnae association; in 1955 she was elected an honorary fellow. She was a fellow of the Linnean Society.

In 1928 she married the artist Percy John Smith, taking the surname Delf-Smith. They found common interests in drawing and gardening and had a happy marriage, but Smith died in 1948. Delf-Smith died on 23 February 1980 at the age of ninety-seven.
