= Dutch ship Delft =

Several ships of the Dutch Navy have borne the name Delft:

- Delft (1658), a 36-gun ship, captured in 1665 during the Battle of Lowestoft and taken into service as HMS Delft. She was sold in 1668.
- Delft (1664), a 36-gun ship, removed from Navy lists in 1667.
- Delft (1666), a 66-gun ship, removed from Navy lists in 1689.
- Delft (1691), a 60-gun ship, removed from Navy lists in 1697.
- Delft (1699), a 54-gun ship, removed from Navy lists in 1712.
- Delft (1731), a 56-gun ship, removed from Navy lists in 1778.
- Delft (1783), a 54-gun ship, captured in 1797 during the Battle of Camperdown, which later sank due to damage received.
