= Boyle Somerville =

Royal Navy officer, hydrographer and author

Vice-Admiral Boyle Somerville CMG
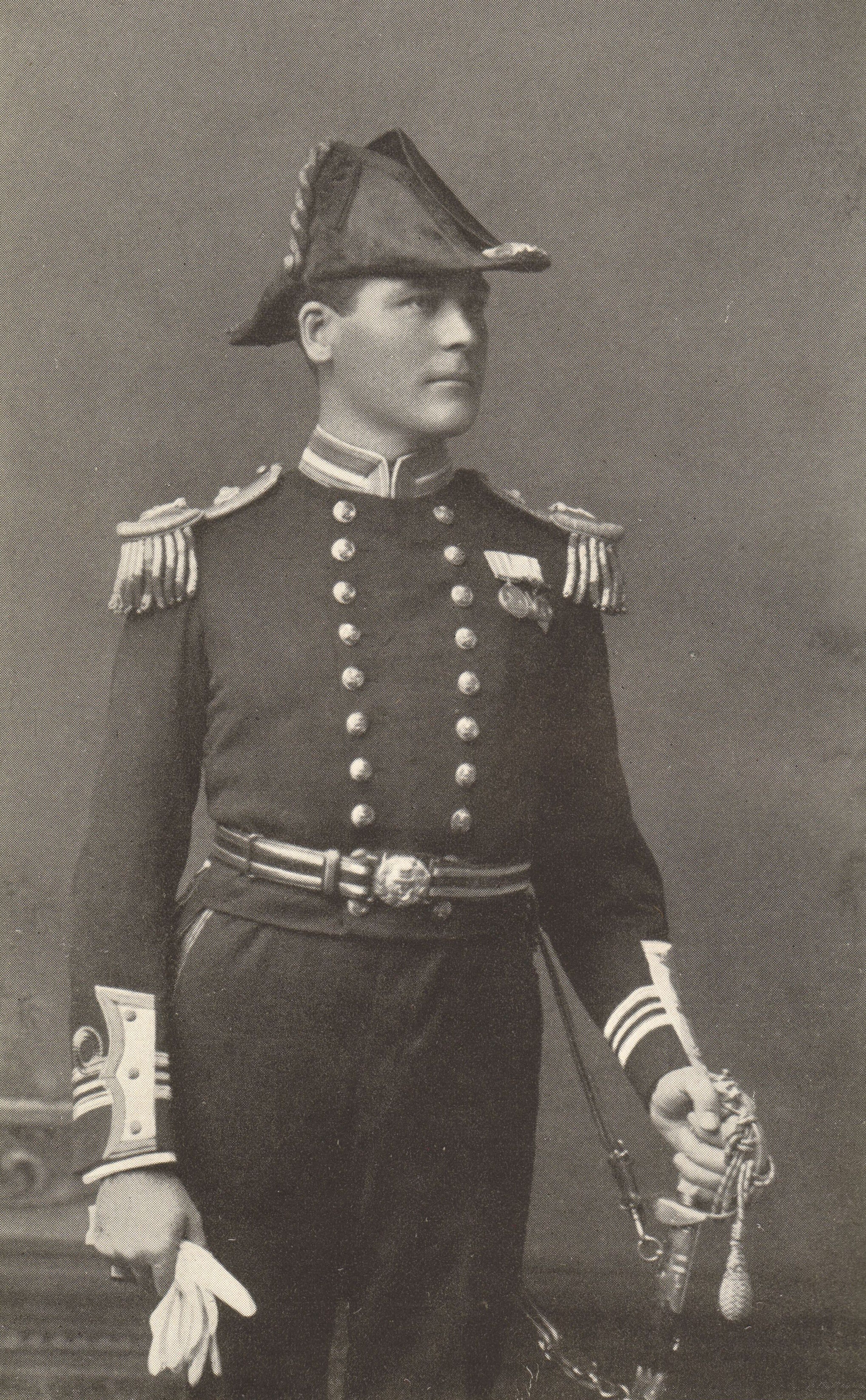
- Somerville in 1928
- Born: 7 September 1863; Castletownshend, County Cork
- Died: 24 March 1936 (aged 72); Castletownshend, County Cork
- Spouse: Helen Mabel Allen (m. 1896)
- Relatives: Edith Somerville (sister)
- Military career
- Allegiance: United Kingdom
- Branch: Royal Navy
- Service years: 1877–1919
- Rank: Vice-Admiral
- Commands: HMS Devonshire; HMS King Alfred; HMS Amphitrite; HMS Argonaut; HMS Victorian
- Conflicts: Anglo-Egyptian War; World War II
- Awards: Companion of the Order of St Michael and St George

Vice-Admiral Henry Boyle Townshend Somerville CMG (7 September 1863 – 24 March 1936) was a Royal Navy officer, hydrographer and author. His survey work in the Pacific led to an interest in ethnography, and he put together a significant collection of artefacts. He carried out oceanographic and magnetic observations in the Indian Ocean, and developed a sounding apparatus for determining ocean depths from a ship under way. He carried out archaeological work as well as surveying in Britain and Ireland. He was an author of scholarly works as well as of popular accounts of his surveying activities and the comprehensive Ocean Passages of the World. Somerville was killed by the Irish Republican Army in 1936.

== Early life and naval career ==
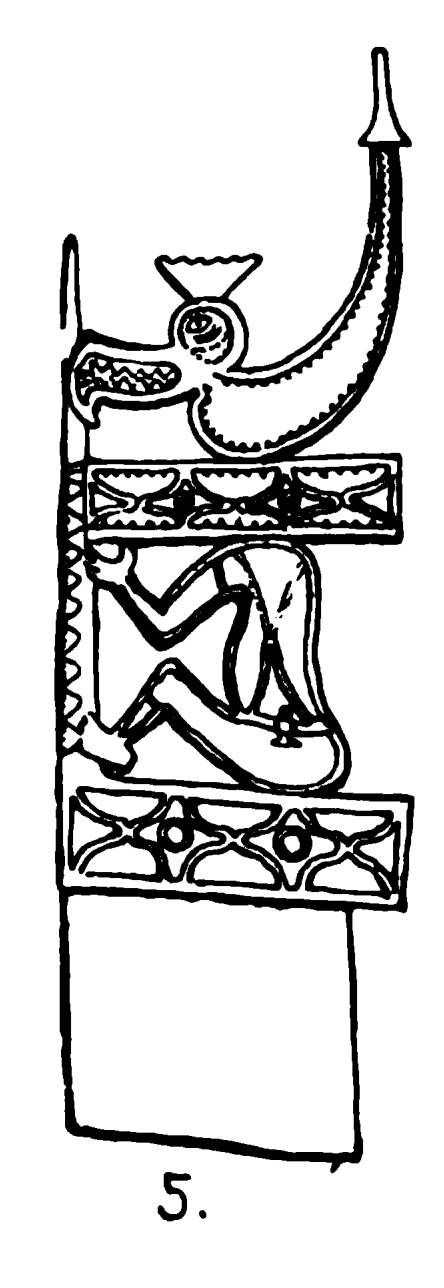
Canoe-prow ornament, collected by Somerville in the Solomon Islands

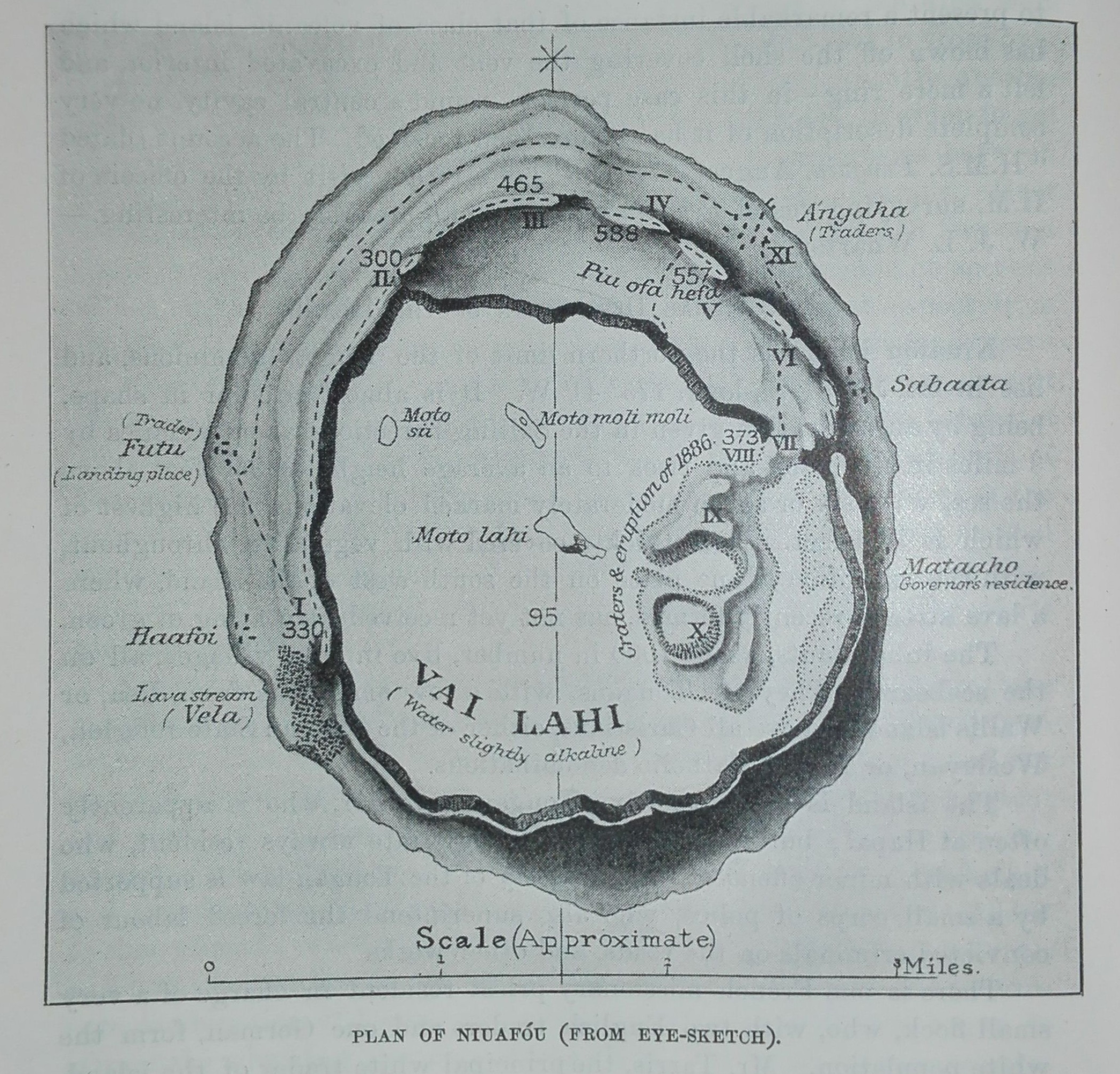
Somervillle's map of Niuafo'ou, published in 1896

Admiralty Chart of the New Hebrides (Vanuatu), surveyed by HMS Dart

Boyle Somerville was born at Castletownshend, County Cork. His father was Thomas Henry Somerville and his mother was Adelaide Eliza Coghill. Somerville joined the Royal Navy as a cadet in 1877. His first service was in South America in 1880, and then in the Anglo-Egyptian War in 1882. He then spent four years on the China Station. He trained as a Hydrographic Surveyor, choosing this branch of the Navy because promotion prospects were good, and because it offered opportunities for a much freer existence than the "intolerable uniformity" that he saw as typical of much Navy life.

As a lieutenant, Somerville worked on the surveys of the Queensland coast and the New Hebrides, now Vanuatu, in the South Pacific, (HMS Dart, 1890–91). While in Vanuatu he carried out ethnographical work, which was published in 1894. In 1893–94 he was surveying in the South Pacific with HMS Penguin. Sounding in the Kermadec Trench between New Zealand and Tonga, they found a depth of 5,155 fathoms (9,427 m), the greatest ocean depth ever found up to that time. They then surveyed New Georgia in the Solomon Islands, also with Penguin, and Somerville published an account of the islands and its peoples. He built a significant collection of ethnographic artefacts from the Solomon Islands which is now in the Pitt Rivers Museum, Oxford. The collection includes personal ornaments, canoe carvings and some of the tools used to make them, and fishing implements. Henry Balfour, curator of the museum, wrote an article in 1905 discussing bird and human designs in the Solomon Islands, making use of material collected by Somerville. In 1895, working on the survey of Tonga, also on Penguin, Somerville took the opportunity to visit Niuafo'ou, and published an early description of the island.

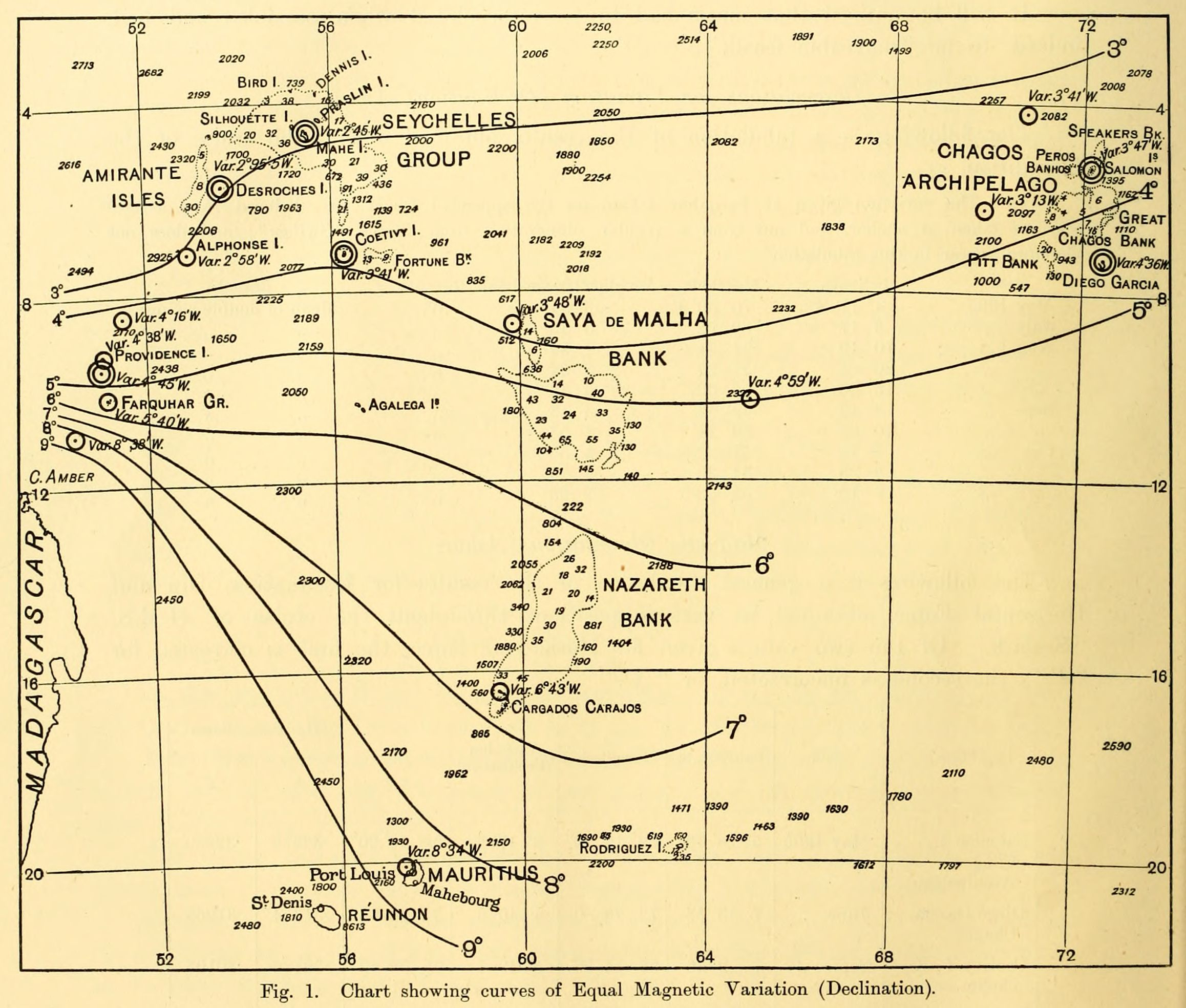
Chart of magnetic variation in the Indian Ocean, from the Percy Sladen Trust Expedition of 1905

Admiralty Chart of Bearhaven, Ireland, Surveyed by Somerville in 1910

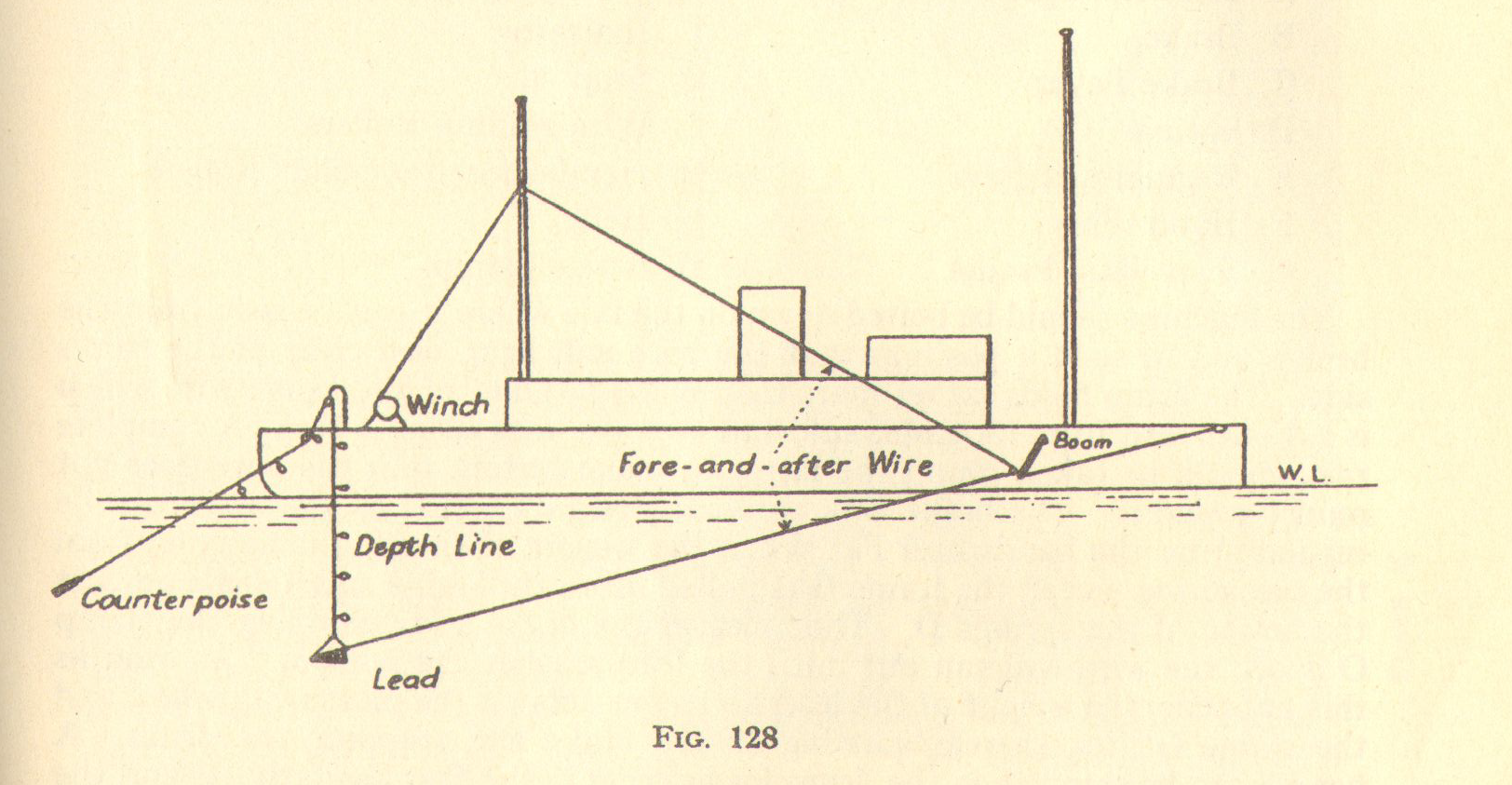
Somerville Sounding Gear

In 1897, Somerville joined HMS Egeria working mostly in British Columbia, but with some surveying in western South America and the Pacific. In 1899, Egeria carried out soundings for a proposed telegraph cable in the north Pacific between Vancouver and Hawaii. 166 soundings were carried out in depths up to 3,407 fathoms (6,231 m). Somerville wrote the report of the sounding cruise. In 1900 he joined HMS Triton spending two seasons in home waters. He was promoted to commander on 31 December 1901, and the following year was posted to the Hydrographic Department for temporary service. In 1902 he carried out a tidal survey of the channel Islands, and he surveyed in the Persian Gulf in 1902–03.(HMS Sphinx), His brief included evaluating potential enemy naval bases on the Persian shore. He surveyed in Ceylon and the Indian Ocean between 1904 and 1907 with HMS Sealark. In the summer of 1905, Somerville and HMS Sealark were assigned to the Indian Ocean expedition sponsored by the Percy Sladen Trust, which was led by J. Stanley Gardiner. Somerville took part in the scientific work of the expedition, as well as making oceanographic and magnetic observations. From 1908 to 1914 he surveyed British coastal waters in HMS Research. He was promoted to captain in 1912 and vice admiral on 1 August 1919. G.S. Ritchie, Hydrographer of the Navy from 1966 to 1971, described him as a "surveyor of distinction". Shortly before the First World War, Somerville developed a steam-operated sounding machine for determining ocean depth from a ship that was under way.

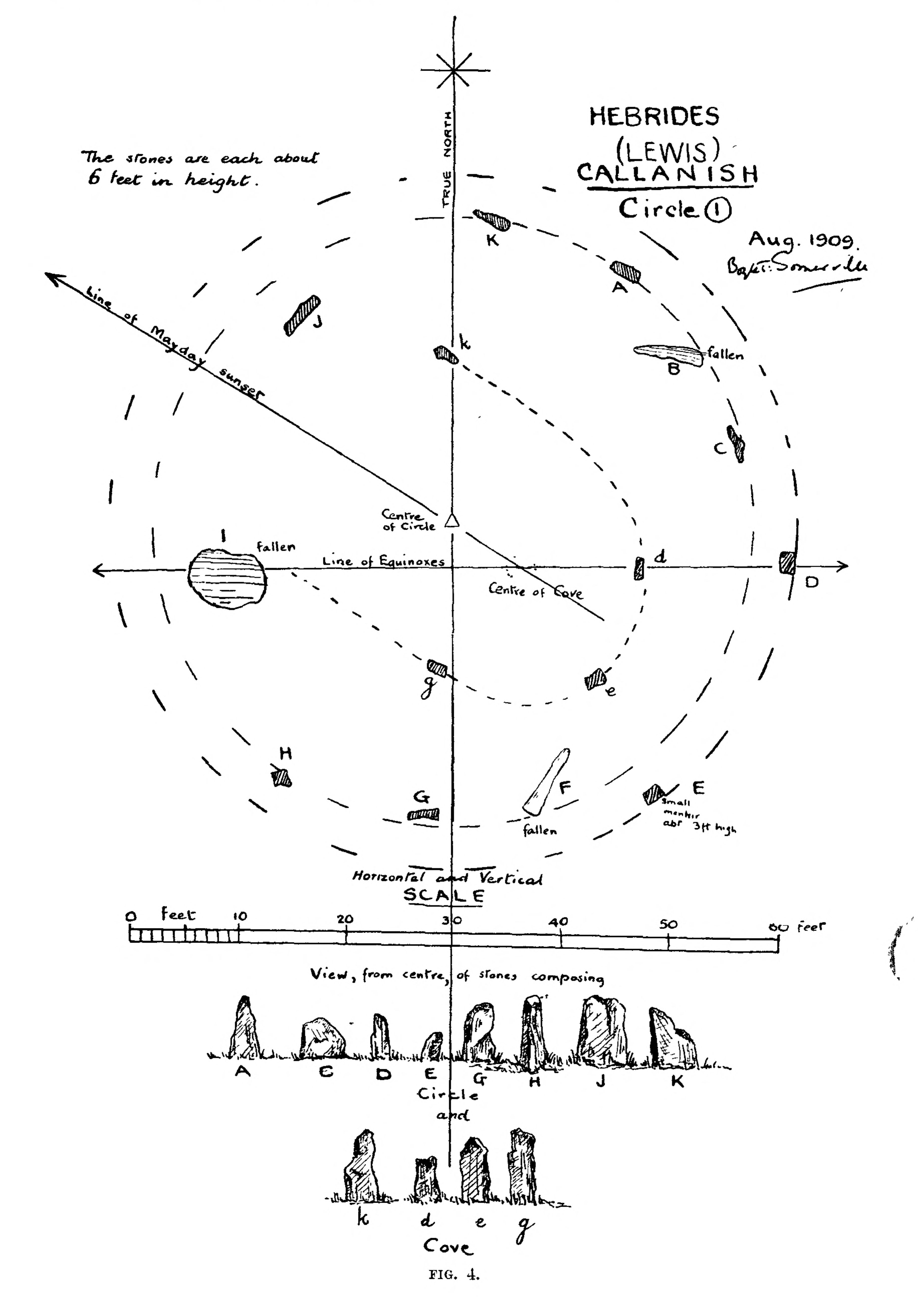
Somerville's plan of the Callanish stones on the Isle of Lewis, Scotland

In 1908, while surveying in British waters, Somerville read a book suggesting stone circles and standing stones might have astronomical significance. He thereafter devoted much of his time to surveying and in some cases excavating, such monuments in Britain, Ireland and elsewhere, and became a recognised expert in the field of archaeoastronomy. Among the sites he described were the Drombeg stone circle in County Cork, a group of monuments near Lough Swilly in County Donegal, and the Callanish standing stones in the Outer Hebrides. He summarised his findings and ideas in two later articles. A modern overview of his work has been provided by Lacey (2008)

During the First World War Somerville served in the North Atlantic Patrol from 1914 to 1916, commanding HMS Victorian, HMS Argonaut, HMS Amphitrite and HMS King Alfred. Operations were based around Madeira, the Canary Islands, the Azores and the Cape Verde Islands. With no safe harbours in these islands the ships were always at sea during the night, taking on coal only during daylight hours, to reduce the risk of submarine attacks. This led to one spell of 385 consecutive nights at sea during 1915 to 1916. Somerville was involved in the "diplomacy of force" with the Spanish authorities to prevent violations of neutrality, both regarding use of radio communications and port facilities by the Germans. In October 1914 this led to the internment in La Palma of the Macedonia, a neutral-flagged vessel believed to be provisioning the German commerce-raider SMS Karlsruhe. In 1917 he was based in Halifax, Nova Scotia, commanding HMS Devonshire on Atlantic convoy support. One incident he describes from this period was The Great Search of the ship conveying the German Ambassador Count Bernstorff from the United States back to Germany after diplomatic relations were discontinued. The search occurred in Halifax, Nova Scotia, took 10 days, and yielded considerable quantities of contraband. As part of the late summer 1917 reorganisation of the burgeoning British Secret Intelligence Service, led by Mansfield Smith-Cumming and his de facto deputy, Colonel Freddie Browning, Somerville was appointed as "officer in charge of the Naval Section within the Secret Service Bureau". This was the first career naval officer posting to the Secret Service. In February 1919, Somerville wrote a review setting out a number of basic principles for service and encouraging the development of specialist intelligence technical skills within the navy for intelligence gathering and analysis. Also in February 1919, he was appointed a Companion of the Order of St Michael and St George "in recognition of valuable services during the war".

== Retirement and death ==
Somerville retired on 2 August 1919. After his retirement he returned to the family home at Castletownshend, near Cork in Ireland. During his retirement He continued to work for the Admiralty, in the Hydrographic Department and on the Tidal Committee, and published several books including Ocean Passages for the World in 1923. He also published articles describing his surveying experiences in Blackwood's Magazine. He continued to be active in archaeology, publishing his last paper in 1931.

Somerville was killed on the evening of 24 March 1936 by the Irish Republican Army (IRA). He went to answer a knocking at the front door. "Are you Mr Somerville?"; "I am Admiral Somerville." He was then shot five times through the glass-panelled front door. A note was left saying that "This British agent has recruited 52 boys to the British Army in the past few months".IRA chief of staff Tom Barry was involved in authorising his killing. The family rejected the claim that he recruited for the armed forces, saying that he merely gave references to young people who called to the family door and asked for a reference. The mention of the British Army in the note led to suspicions that the target was in fact his Army brother who lived close by, and was more prominent and a much more likely target. The admiral was an Irish language speaker, and he was a "nationalist". Somerville's killing was one of the events that led the de Valera government to ban the IRA (18 June 1936). IRA leader Tom Barry stated in an interview in later years that the shooting was a mistake in that he was only meant to have been taken hostage.

Somerville was the younger brother of the novelist and artist, Edith Somerville, who finished his biography of William Mariner for its posthumous publication. His brothers included Colonel Thomas Cameron Fitzgerald Somerville, and Colonel John (J.A.C. Somervell), both Commandants of The Royal Military School of Music at Kneller Hall. He is buried in St. Barrahane's Church in Castletownshend.

== Published works ==
- Ocean Passages for the World. Published for Hydrographic Dept., Admiralty, by HMSO (1923). Full text of the second edition (1950) is available at the Internet Archive.
- A series of articles published between 1919 and 1927 in Blackwood's Magazine, including surveying work in Queensland, New Hebrides (now Vanuatu) and New Caledonia and experiences in World War 1:
  - The Great Search, vol. 206, November 1919, pp. 690–699
  - The Ninth Cruiser Squadron, Parts I-III, vol. 207, January 1920, pp. 1–23
  - The Ninth Cruiser Squadron, Part IV, vol. 207, February 1920, pp. 153–168
  - A Secret Survey, Part I, vol. 207, June 1920, pp. 812–825
  - A Secret Survey, Part II, vol. 208, July 1920, pp. 88–97
  - The Chart-Makers, vol. 220, December 1926, pp. 814–851
  - The Chart-Makers, vol. 221, February 1927, pp. 243–266
  - The Chart-Makers, vol. 221, April 1927, pp. 501–524
  - The Deepest Depth, vol. 222, October 1927, pp. 550–565
- The Chart-Makers. Blackwell & Sons (1928). A collection of some of the Blackwood's Magazine articles listed above.
- Commodore Anson's Voyage into the South Seas and Around the World. Heinemann. (1934)
- Will Mariner. Faber & Faber. (1936)
- Records of the Somerville Family of Castlehaven & Drishane from 1174 to 1940 (with Edith Anna Somerville). Published by Guy & Co, Cork, 1940

See also:

- The Selected letters of Somerville and Ross edited by Gifford Lewis, Faber (1989)
- MI6 The History of the Secret Intelligence Service 1909–1949, by Keith Jeffery, Bloomsbury (2010).
