= Saint Barrahane's Church =

Church of St Barrahane
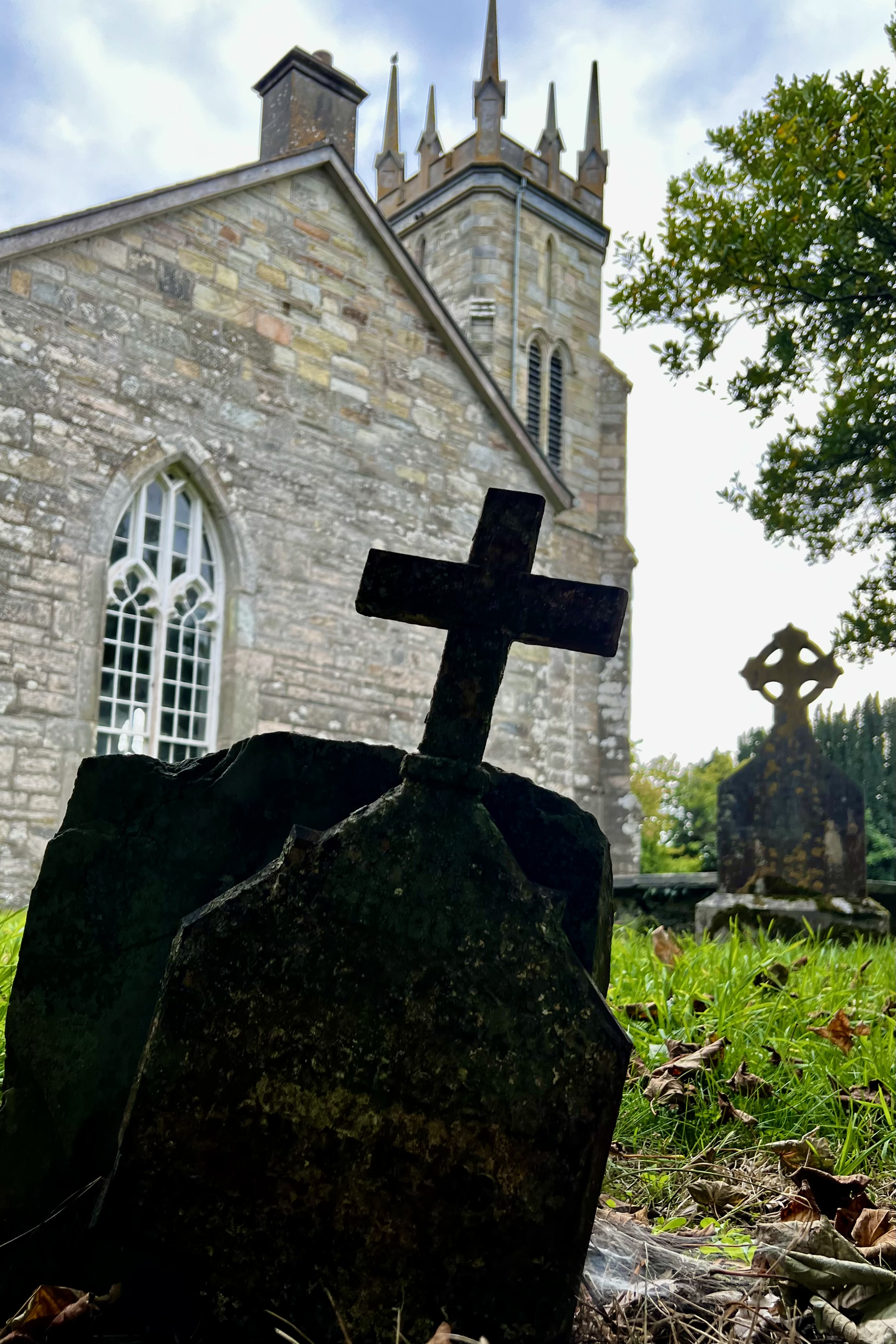
- St Barrahane's Church, view from the graveyard
- Church of St Barrahane
- 51.52963°N 9.17340°W
- Location: Castletownsend
- Country: Ireland
- Denomination: Church of Ireland

History
- Dedication: Saint Barrahane
- Dedicated: 1826
- Consecrated: 1826

Architecture
- Functional status: active
- Architect: James Pain
- Style: Neo-Ghotic

Specifications
- Materials: limestone, sandstone, slate

Administration
- Parish: Castlehaven

Saint Barrahane's Church is a 19th century church in Castletownshend, County Cork, Ireland. The church, belonging to the denomination of the Church of Ireland, is situated on an elevation overlooking the town and the Castlehaven Bay, belongs to the Castlehaven parish, and should not be confused with the Catholic church named after the same patron St. Barrahane which is situated 1.6km to the west.

== Name ==
The dedication of the church may be related to the saint Barahan or to the original name of its parish whose name was initially documented as Glenberchin as early as the 12th century, and then as Glenbarahan (or Glen Barrahane) in the 17th century.

== History ==
The church was built on the site of an older church of 1761 whose eastern gable is still present in the current graveyard, and which in turn was built on the site of another "ancient church".

== Architecture ==
The church is built in the Gothic Revival style, and was designed by architect James Pain. It was completed in 1826 at the cost of £1384. Sandstone quarried on Horse Island was used in the construction. and the design includes a three-storey tower with corner pinnacles, pointed arch door opening, and an altarpiece whose history reaches mediaeval times. The church organs were gifted in 1828 by Lady Hanrietta Townsend, and underwent restoration in 1957. Otherwise the original wooden organs and timber panelling remain intact. Three stained-glass windows were made by Harry Clarke, depicting Nativity, St. Martin of Tours, and St. Luke. Three more were made by Powell of London. Fifty two steps lead to the church to symbolize the fifty two Sundays of a year. The church underwent significant remodelling in 1889, including rebuilding of the roof. The roof was rebuilt again in 2000 at the cost of 43,000 pounds, and dedicated on July 9, 2000, by the bishop of Cork Paul Colton.

In the porch there is an oar from the life boats of the sunken RMS Lusitania. Adjacent to the church, there is a small graveyard where the mass grave of the Lusitania victims is located and where, among others, the novelist Edith Somerville who lived and died in Castletownshend, and who was an organist at the church, is buried. So is her long-term literary partner Violet Florence Martin, with whom she formed the literary duo Somerville and Ross. To fulfil Edith Somerville's wish to be buried next to her partner, rock had to be blown up in the churchyard, which anecdotally was done with the help of IRA's explosives. There is also a monument to them in the church designed by William Sharpington.

== Music festival ==
The Festival of Classical Music takes place annually in the church, started in 1980 by Michael Sokolov-Grant. The festival takes place in summer, and gathers musicians from around Ireland and large audiences who take avail of the church's exceptional acoustics, and capacity of 200.
