= Ethel Penrose =

Children's writer from Ireland (1857–1938)

Ethel Charlotte Coghill Penrose
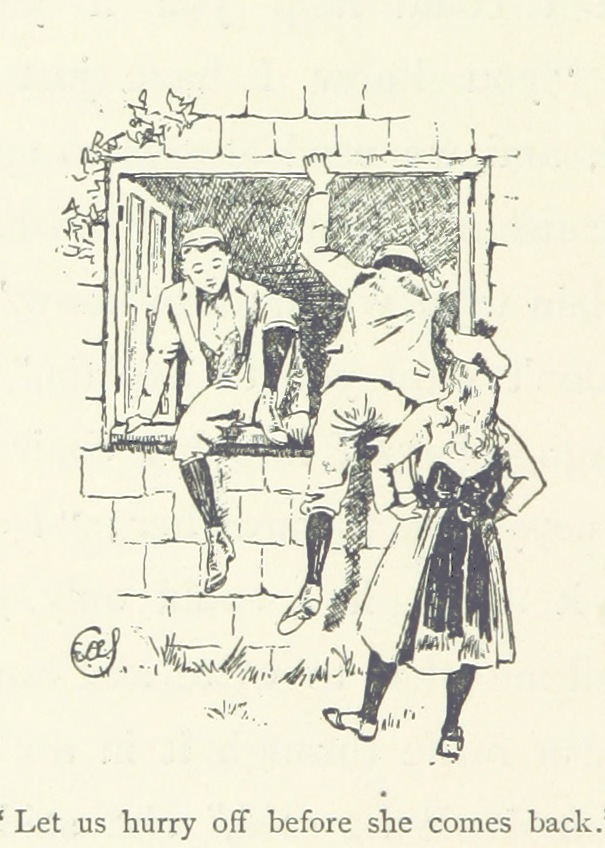
- Illustration taken from page 52 of 'Clear as the Noon Day'
- Born: 1857; Dublin, Ireland
- Died: 1 June 1938 (aged 80–81)
- Occupation: Writer
- Writing career
- Genre: Children's

Ethel Charlotte Coghill Penrose (1857 – 1 June 1938) was an Irish children's writer.

== Life and career ==
Born Ethel Charlotte Coghill in Dublin in 1857 to Irish photographer Sir John Joscelyn Coghill, 4th Baronet, and his wife the Hon. Katherine Frances, daughter of John Plunket, 3rd Baron Plunket of Castletownshend, County Cork. She had two sisters and four brothers. She married a land agent, James Penrose on 30 December 1880 in Skibbereen. They moved to Lismore, County Waterford to live for several years. Together they had at least four children. She died on 1 June 1938.

Penrose began writing children's books and had several published. Clear as the noon day was illustrated by her cousin, Edith Somerville.

== Bibliography ==
- The Fairy Cobbler's Gold (London, Nelson & Sons, 1890 and 1902)
- Darby and Joan: being the adventures of two children (London, Blackie & Son, 1894)
- Clear as the noon day (London, Jarrold & Sons, 1893)
