= Violet Florence Martin =

Irish author

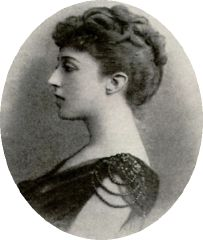
- Born: 11 June 1862; Ross House, Connemara, County Galway, Ireland
- Died: 21 December 1915 (aged 53); Drishane, County Cork, Ireland
- Citizenship: United Kingdom of Great Britain and Ireland
- Education: Alexandra College
- Occupation: novelist
- Writing career
- Pen name: Martin Ross
- Language: English
- Years active: 1889–1915
- Notable works: The Real Charlotte, The Irish R.M.

Violet Florence Martin (11 June 1862 – 21 December 1915) was an Irish author who co-wrote a series of novels with cousin Edith Somerville under the pen name of Martin Ross (Somerville and Ross) in the late nineteenth and early twentieth centuries.

== Early life ==
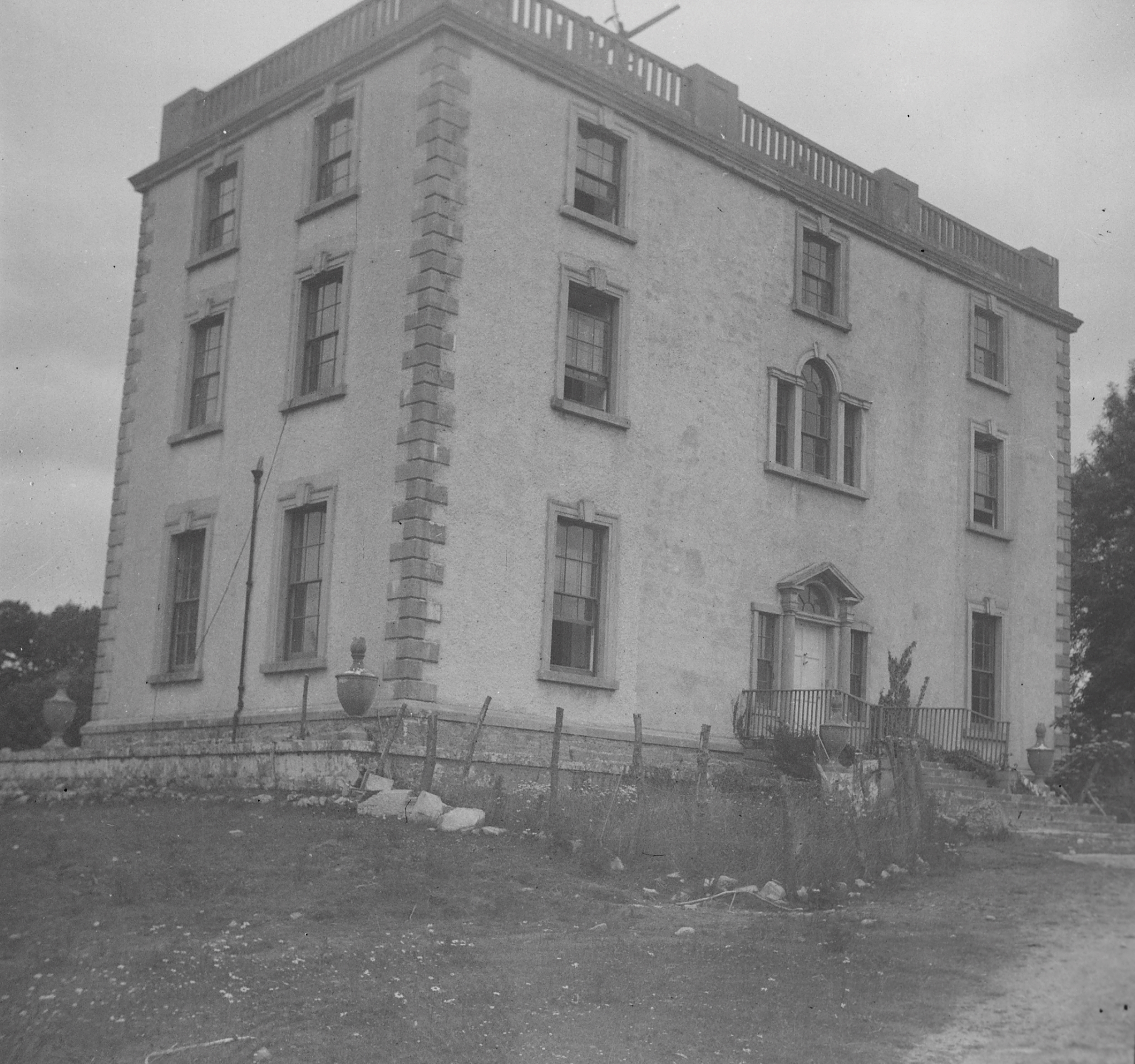
Ross House, Galway in 1942

Martin was born at Ross House in Connemara, County Galway, the youngest of sixteen children of James Martin of Ross (1804–1872). The Martin family, a branch of the Martyn family - one of the Tribes of Galway - had settled at Ross by the early seventeenth century, having previously inhabited the town of Galway for some three hundred years. Her father, James, was a Protestant, his grandfather having converted from the Catholic faith in order to retain the family estates under the Penal Laws. Nevertheless, each child of the family was secretly 'baptised' by the family servants, a practice James Martin winked at.

She was a kinswoman of Richard Martin and her contemporary, Edward Martyn, two other notable members of the tribe. Her older brother, Robert Jasper Martin, was a noted songwriter and a well-regarded member of the Tory party in London. She shared a great-grandmother with the writer Maria Edgeworth, whose use of Irish vernacular speech she followed in her work.

Her father had managed to save both his estate and his tenants during the Great Famine - boasting that not one of his people died during the disaster - but at the cost of bankruptcy. Following his death in 1872, the family moved to Dublin and only returned to Ross in 1888 following revelations of financial fraud of the estate by their agent.

== Writings and companionship with Edith Somerville ==
Violet Martin and Edith Somerville were second cousins. They originally met on 17 January 1886 at Castletownshend, after which they became lifelong companions and literary partners. They came to share a home in Drishane, County Cork. In 1889, Violet adopted the pseudonym Martin Ross, which comprised her surname and the name of her ancestral home; thus the authors were called Somerville and Ross. Their works included The Real Charlotte (1889), Some Reminiscences of an Irish R.M. and In The Vine Country. The precise nature of their relationship — whether they were romantic and sexual partners as well as literary collaborators and friends — has been the object of speculation by later writers.

== Political and cultural outlook ==
Martin was a convinced Irish unionist, in opposition to Somerville's open nationalism. Both she and her brother Robert were well-regarded members of the literary circle in Irish unionism. However, unlike her brother, Martin was a convinced suffragette, becoming vice-president of the Munster Women's Franchise League. While on friendly terms with the leading members of the Gaelic literary revival such as W. B. Yeats and Lady Gregory, she objected to their romantic version of Irish peasantry. She was on good terms with Edward Martyn, partner of Gregory and Yeats - and her kinsman - and shared his love of the Irish language and culture.

== Later years ==
Violet was seriously injured in a riding accident in November 1898, from which she never fully recovered. This was a contributing factor to her death in Drishane, County Cork, in 1915. Edith Somerville continued to write under their joint literary names, claiming that they were still in contact. The two women left thousands of letters and 116 volumes of diaries, detailing their lives, much of them yet unpublished. Edith died at Castletownshend in October 1949, aged 91, and is buried alongside Violet Florence Martin at Saint Barrahane's Church, Castletownsend, County Cork, Ireland. There is a joint memorial to them there.

She was awarded a posthumous D.Litt. by Trinity College Dublin.

== Collaborative novels ==
- An Irish Cousin (1889)
- Naboth's Vineyard (1891)
- In the Vine Country (1893)
- Through Connemara in a Governess Cart (1893)
- The Real Charlotte (1894)
- Beggars on Horseback (1895)
- The Silver Fox (1897)
- Some Experiences of an Irish R. M. (1899)
- A Patrick's Day Hunt (1902)
- All on the Irish Shore (1903)
- Further Experiences of an Irish R.M. (1908)
- Dan Russell the Fox (1911)
- In Mr Knox's Country (1915)

== See also ==
- The Tribes of Galway

== References and sources ==
Notes

Sources

- Boylan, Henry (1998). A Dictionary of Irish Biography (third ed.). Dublin: Gill and MacMillan. p. 273. ISBN 0-7171-2945-4.
- Lewis, Gifford (1987). Somerville and Ross: The World of the Irish RM. London: Penguin. ISBN 0-14-008262-X.
