= The Real Charlotte =

1894 novel by Somerville and Ross

- First edition in three volumes
- Author: Somerville and Ross
- Working title: The Welsh Cousin
- Language: English
- Genre: romance novel, novel of manners, domestic realism
- Set in: Dublin, 1883; County Galway, Bray, County Wicklow and Paris, June 1889–June 1890
- Publisher: Ward and Downey
- Publication date: 1894
- Publication place: Ireland
- Media type: Print: hardback
- Pages: 3 volumes
- Dewey Decimal: 823.8
- LC Class: PR6037 .O6
- Preceded by: Through Connemara in a Governess Cart
- Followed by: Beggars on Horseback

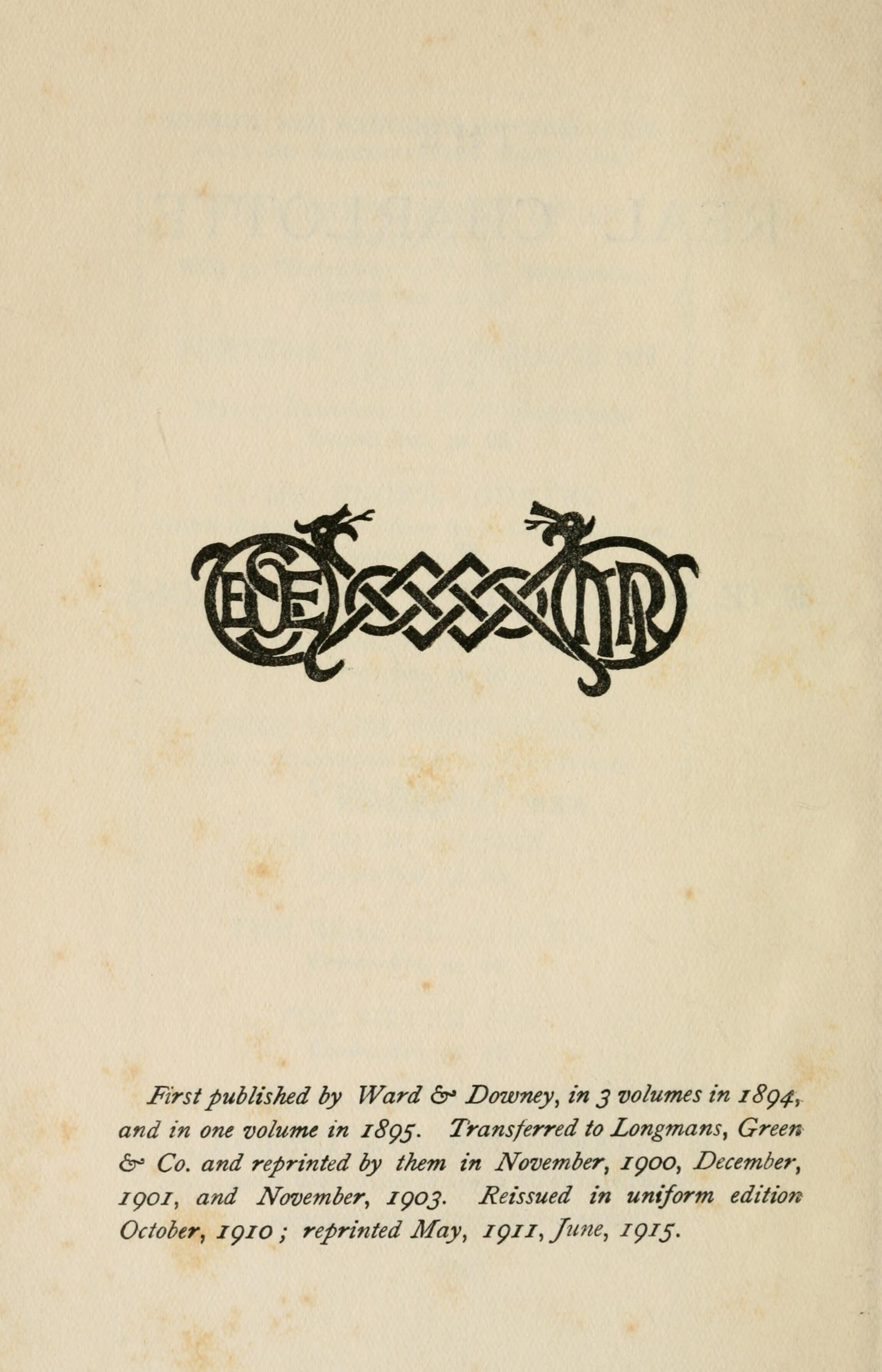
Edition notice from a 1915 edition, with a dual monograms of E.Œ.S. and M.R.

The Real Charlotte is a novel (written between 1888 and 1890, and published in 1894) by the Anglo-Irish writing partnership Somerville and Ross, composed of Edith Somerville (1858–1949) and Violet Florence Martin (1862–1915).

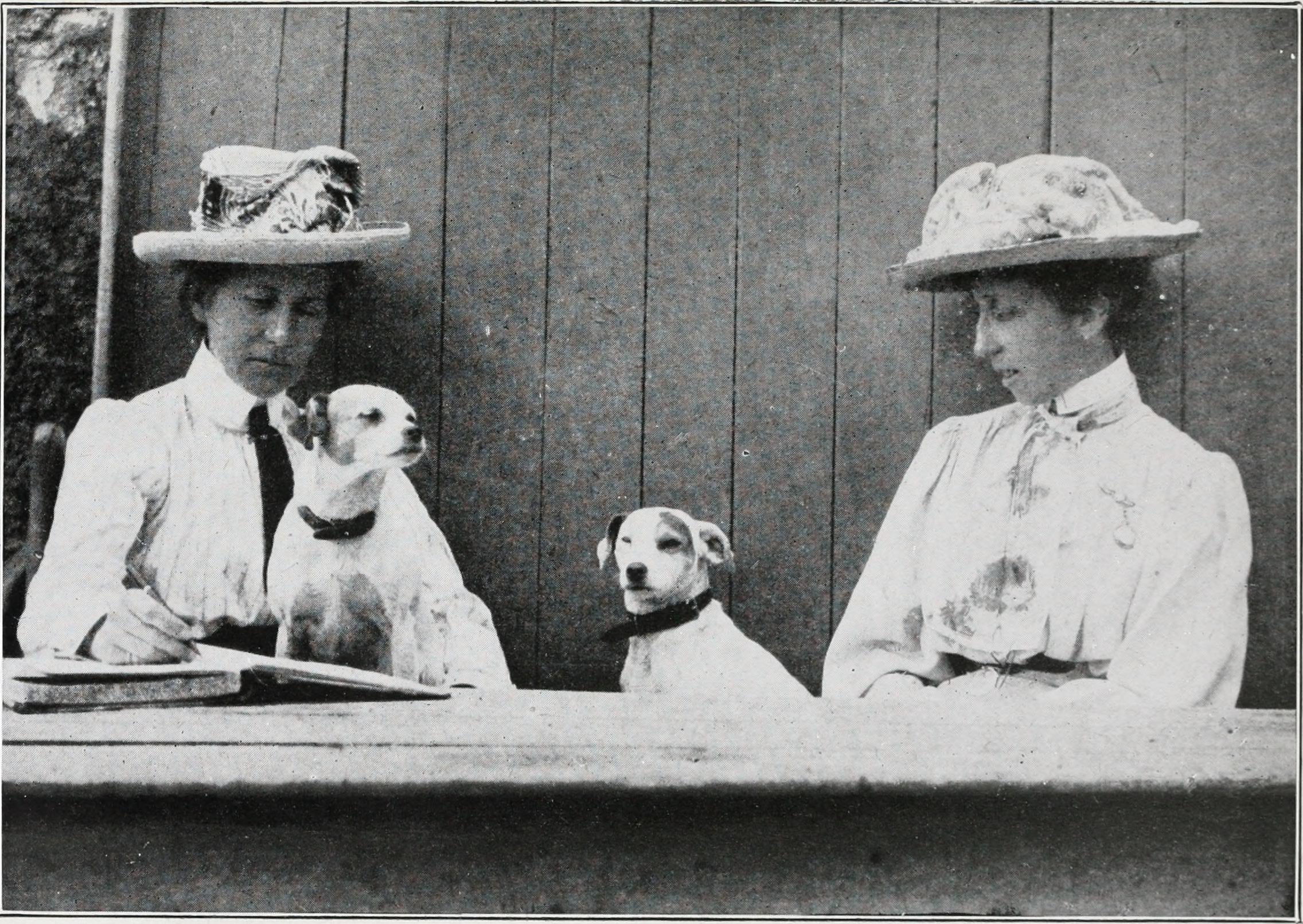
Photograph of Edith Somerville (left) and Violet Florence Martin (right)

The first printing in 1894 consisted of three volumes containing a total of 51 chapters. The three volumes were reprinted in a single volume in 1895, with many further single-volume reprints in the following years.

== Settings ==
The first chapter takes place in Dublin in 1883, showing the young Francie Fitzpatrick and Roderick Lambert.

The rest of the book is set in 1889–90 in rural County Galway, in or near to Connemara, with some chapters in Bray, County Wicklow and Paris. (Some accounts claim that the book is set in County Cork, but mentions of Galway city, Ballinasloe, "the Connemara mountains" and the "Galway hills" make it clear that it is set in County Galway.) Much of the story takes place in or near the fictitious town of Lismoyle and mostly centres on three households: Tally Ho Lodge, the home of Charlotte Mullen; Bruff, the country seat of the aristocratic Dysart family; and Rosemount, the home of Mr and Mrs Lambert.

== Characters ==
It is hard to ask pity for Charlotte, whose many evil qualities have without pity been set down, but the seal of ignoble tragedy had been set on her life; she had not asked for love, but it had come to her, twisted to burlesque by the malign hand of fate. There is pathos as well as humiliation in the thought that such a thing as a soul can be stunted by the trivialities of personal appearance, and it is a fact not beyond the reach of sympathy that each time Charlotte stood before her glass her ugliness spoke to her of failure, and goaded her to revenge.

— Chapter XLI

=== Mullen-Fitzpatrick family ===
- Charlotte Mullen, forty years old, single and unattractive both inside and out.
- Mrs. Mullen, Charlotte's old aunt with whom she lives.
- Francie Fitzpatrick, first cousin once removed of Charlotte. An urban middle-class girl of nineteen, considered beautiful by all.
- Johnny Fitzpatrick, Francie's late father.
- Isabella Mullen, Francie's late mother.
- Letitia (Tish) Fitzpatrick, Francie's aunt.
- Robert Fitzpatrick, Francie's uncle.

=== Lambert family ===
- Roderick (Roddy) Lambert, agent of the Dysarts and a Justice of the Peace (J.P.).
- Lucy Lambert (née Galvin), his wife, a nervous older woman with money.

=== Dysart family ===
- Sir Benjamin Dysart, Baronet, local landlord, disabled by stroke.
- Lady Isabel Dysart, his wife, thirty years younger than him.
- Christopher Dysart, their eldest son. Suitor to Francie.
- Pamela Dysart, their daughter.
- Garrett (Garry) Dysart, the youngest son.

=== Servants ===
- Louisa, a Protestant orphan girl who is house- and parlour-maid to Charlotte.
- Norry the Boat, Catholic servant of Charlotte and a first cousin of Julia Duffy.
- Bid Sal, Catholic servant of Charlotte.
- Eliza Hackett, maid in the Lambert household.
- Bridget, maid in the Fitzpatrick household.
- James Canavan, valet to Sir Benjamin Dysart.
- Gorman, the Dysarts' butler.

=== Others ===
- Fanny Hemphill, Dublin friend of Francie.
- Evelyn Hope-Drummond, English friend of Pamela, staying with the Dysarts.
- Archdeacon Gascogne, local Church of Ireland clergyman.
- Kate (Kitty) Gascogne, his wife.
- Julia Duffy, wise woman, Catholic tenant farmer of Sir Benjamin Dysart.
- Billy Grainy, a beggar who does odd jobs for Julia Duffy in exchange for board and lodging.
- Father Heffernan, local Catholic priest.
- Captain Cursiter, a gentleman boat-owner (named Thesiger on his first appearance, apparently a continuity error).
- Lieutenant Gerald Hawkins, English army officer and suitor of Francie.
- Rev. Joseph Corkran, the local Church of Ireland curate.
- Mrs. Corkran, his widowed mother.

== Reception and legacy ==
Initial reviews were negative, with English critics bemoaning the use of the grotesque, disliking the antiheroine Charlotte, and bemoaning the lack of a happy ending.

Molly Keane wrote in 1987 (in her introduction to the Arrow edition of the book) that if the book had been written today it would "be almost a certainty for the Booker Prize, the American Book of the Month Choice, and most probably for the script of an important film travesty". She noted that "the book is a superb piece of architecture" and that it is "an unsurpassed example of a fusion between two lively minds", and that its authors "must have realised their extraordinary achievement, and may have doubted if they could ever touch it again."

In 2000, Brian Fallon wrote in The Irish Times that The Real Charlotte "is generally agreed to be Somerville and Ross's masterpiece, and one of the half-dozen or so Irish novels which might justifiably be called great […] though the authors are somewhat snobbish and condescending towards Francie, the pretty young interloper from Dublin, she is real and touching even in her social gaucherie. The contrasting portrait of scheming Charlotte herself, a really bad woman, has a kind of Balzacian power."

In 2003, it was placed 32nd in "Novel Choice", a list of the top 50 Irish novels.

Scottish pianist and writer Susan Tomes in 2014 wrote that "I can hardly believe that such a fine book has fallen out of the public eye. […] The authors’ understanding of character and motive is remarkable, and their description of life in Ireland at the end of the 19th century is memorably vivid. Even better, the intricate plot closes slowly upon its characters like a giant pair of pincers."

In 2017, Anne Haverty wrote that "The Real Charlotte [may] be the best Irish novel, qua novel, of any century. As Anthony Cronin says, Ulysses, which might seem to qualify as “the best”, is a “fictive construction”, while The Real Charlotte is a powerful exemplar of the classic novel as it was, and sometimes still is, written."

Heather Ingman listed it among her ten favourite Irish books.

Malcolm Jones wrote in The Daily Beast that "The title character […] is such a terrible force of nature that she literally frightens another character to death. That hasn’t stopped me from urging people to make her acquaintance every chance I get."

== Adaptation ==
In 1975, a stage adaptation was produced at the Gate Theatre, written by Terence de Vere White and Adrian Vale and starring Pat Leavy.

In 1990, The Real Charlotte was adapted into a three-part TV miniseries for ITV, starring Jeananne Crowley as Charlotte, Patrick Bergin as Roderick and Joanna Roth as Francie.
