= Edith Somerville =

Irish artist

Edith Œnone Somerville
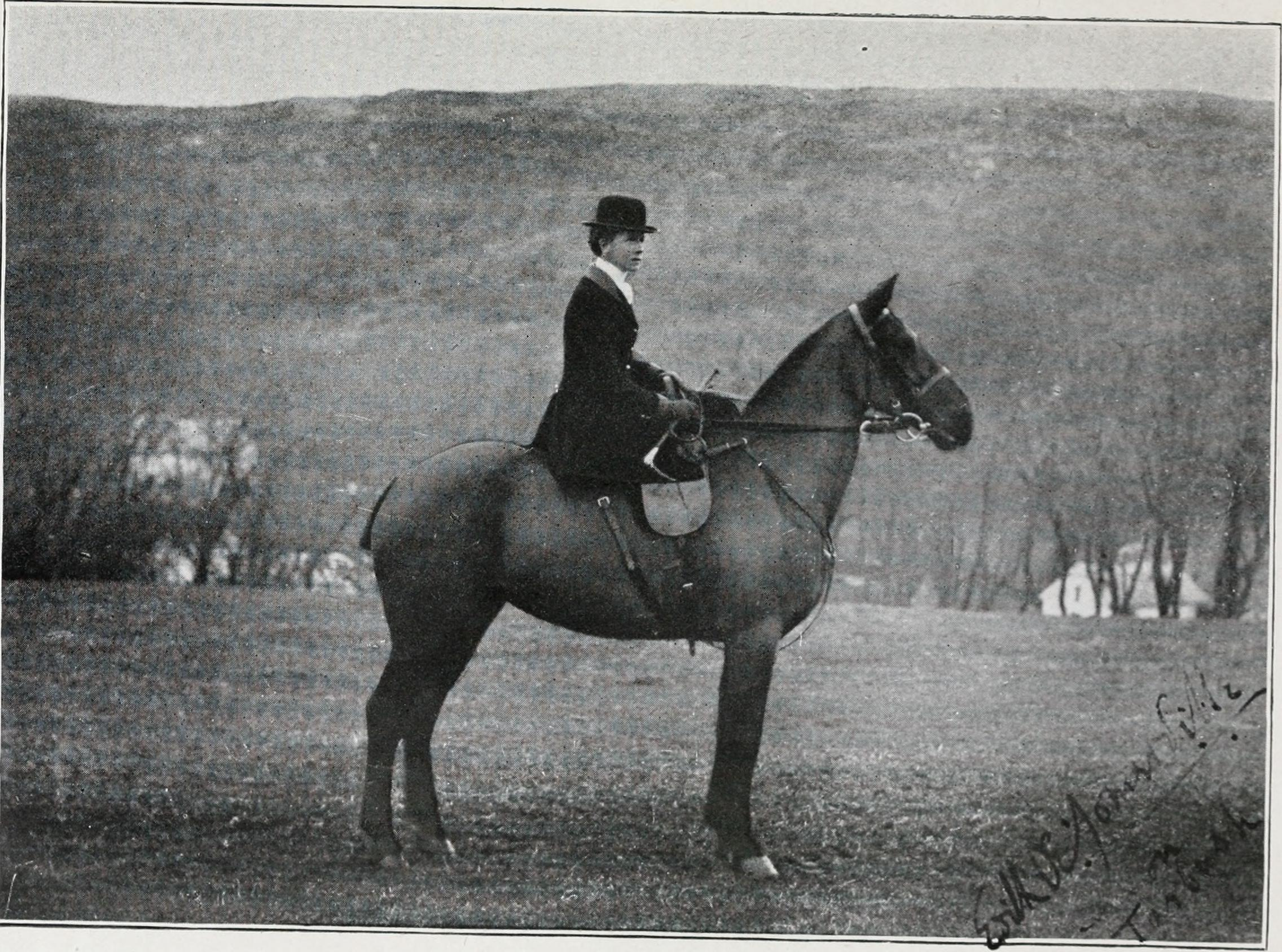
- Somerville atop her horse Tarbush
- Born: 2 May 1858; Corfu, United States of the Ionian Islands (part of modern Greece)
- Died: 8 October 1949 (aged 91); Castletownshend, County Cork, Ireland
- Education: South Kensington School of Art; Royal Westminster School of Art
- Occupation: writer
- Relatives: Henry Boyle Townshend Somerville (brother); Violet Florence Martin (cousin)
- Writing career
- Pen name: Geilles Herring
- Language: English
- Period: 1889–1949
- Notable works: The Real Charlotte, The Irish R.M.

Signature
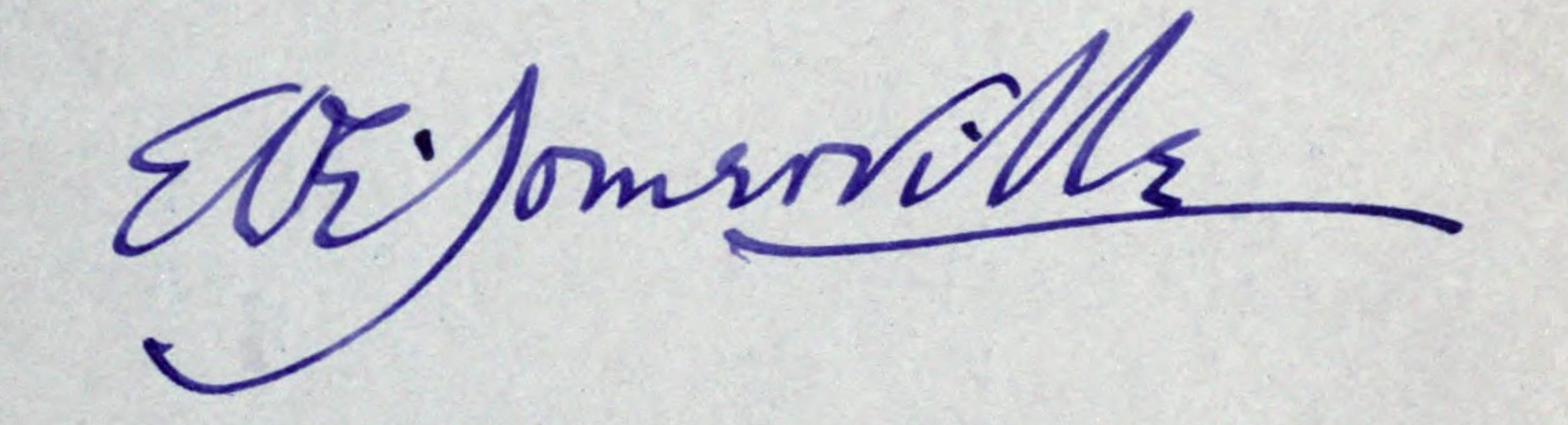

Edith Anna Œnone Somerville (/iːˌnoʊni ˈsʌmərvɪl/; 2 May 1858 – 8 October 1949) was an Irish novelist who habitually signed herself as "E. Œ. Somerville". She wrote in collaboration with her cousin "Martin Ross" (Violet Martin) under the pseudonym "Somerville and Ross". Together they published a series of fourteen stories and novels, the most popular of which were The Real Charlotte, published in 1894, and Some Experiences of an Irish R. M., published in 1899.

== Early life and education ==
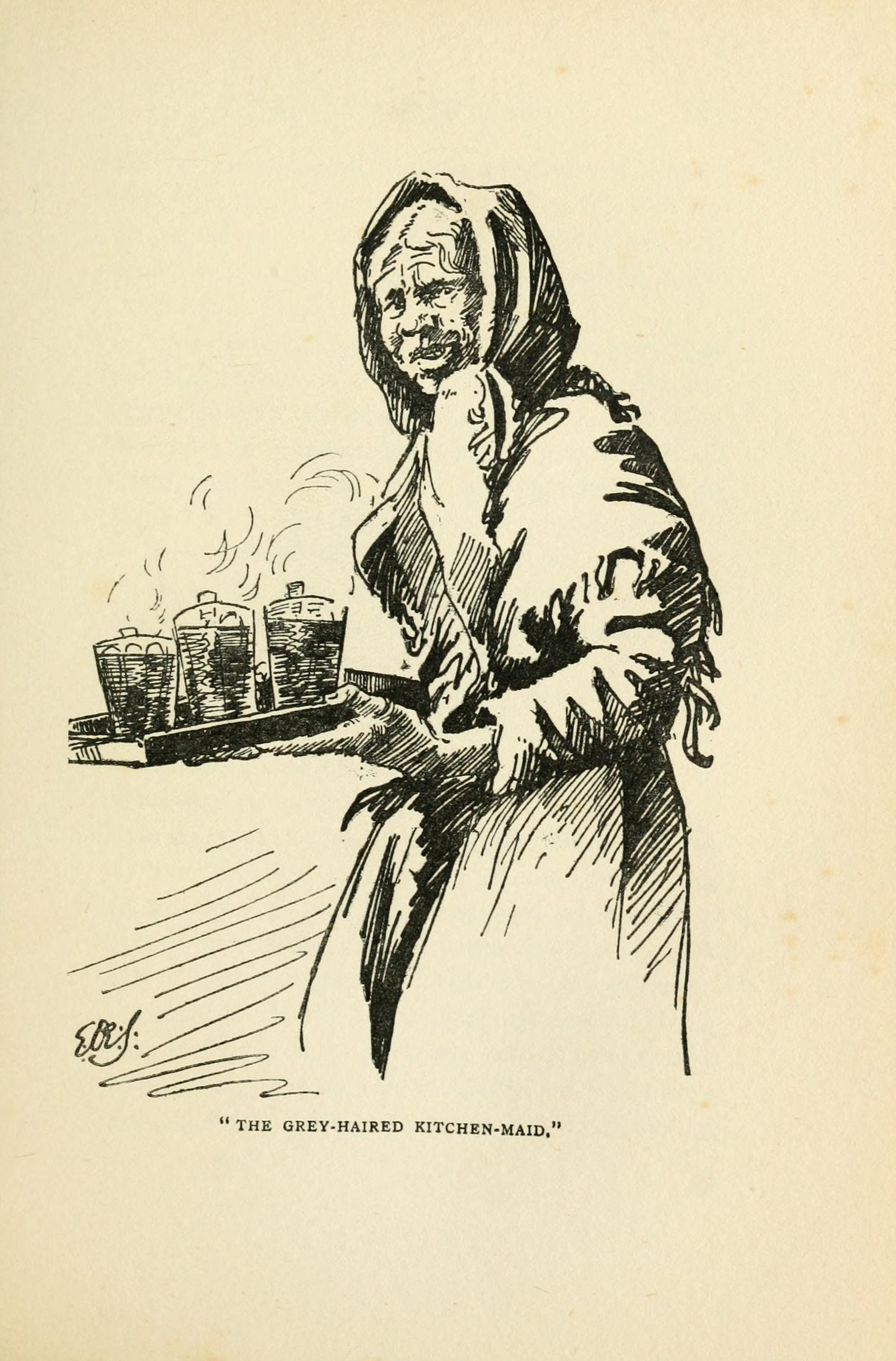
An illustration by Somerville in All on the Irish Shore

The eldest of eight children, Somerville was born on the island of Corfu, then part of the United States of the Ionian Islands, a British protectorate where her father was stationed. A year later, her father retired to Drishane, Castletownshend, County Cork, where Somerville grew up. Somerville is said to have dominated her sister and brothers in a family where women were encouraged to be bold. She received her primary education at home, and then attended Alexandra College in Dublin. In 1884 she went to Paris for the first of several trips to study art at the Académie Colarossi and Académie Delécluse, and then spent a term at the Westminster School of Art in Dean's Yard, Westminster. At home, riding and painting were her absorbing interests.

== Career ==
In January 1886, she met her cousin Violet Martin, and their literary partnership began the following year. Their first book, An Irish Cousin, appeared in 1889, under the names Geilles Herring (from the maiden name of her ancestor, the wife of Sir Walter de Somerville of Linton and Carnwath) and Martin Ross, though the pen names were dropped after the first edition. In 1898 Edith Somerville went to paint at the Etaples art colony, accompanied by Violet. There they profited from their stay by conceiving together the stories later gathered in Some Experiences of an Irish R. M., completed the following year. By the time Violet died in 1915, they had published fourteen books together. Her cousin's death stunned Edith, who continued to write as "Somerville and Ross", claiming that they kept in contact through spiritualist séances. The precise nature of their relationship — whether they were romantic and sexual partners as well as literary collaborators and friends — has been the object of speculation by later writers.

Somerville was a devoted sportswoman who, in 1903, had become master of the West Carbery Foxhounds. She was also active in the suffragist movement, corresponding with Dame Ethel Smyth. She was in London still recovering from the shock of Violet's death when the Easter Rising of 1916 broke out. On 9 May, she wrote a letter to The Times, blaming the British government for the state of affairs in Ireland. After that, she tended towards Nationalism, and as an adept musician at parties, she specialised in Irish tunes and Nationalist songs.

She had exhibitions of her pictures in Dublin and in London between 1920 and 1938, and was active as an illustrator of sporting picture books and children's picture books, including that of Ethel Penrose, another cousin.

In 1936, her brother Henry Boyle Townsend Somerville, a retired Vice-Admiral in the Royal Navy, was killed by the IRA at the family home in Castletownshend. She finished his book "Will Mariner" after his death.

== Death and legacy ==
She died at Castletownshend in October 1949, aged 91, and is buried alongside Violet Florence Martin at Saint Barrahane's Church, Castletownsend with a joint memorial to them both. A considerable archival legacy remains both at Castletownsend and in Trinity College Library.

The Irish RM books were made into a TV series, titled The Irish R.M., in 1983.

Edith-a novel, based on her life in the period 1921–22, by Martina Devlin, was published in 2022.

== Bibliography ==
=== Collaborative Works ===
- An Irish Cousin (1889)
- Naboth's Vineyard (1891)
- In the Vine Country (1893) - nonfiction
- Through Connemara in a Governess Cart (1893)
- The Real Charlotte (1894)
- Beggars on Horseback: A Riding Tour in North Wales (1895) - nonfiction
- The Silver Fox (1897)
- Some Experiences of an Irish R. M. (1899)
- A Patrick's Day Hunt (1902)
- All on the Irish Shore (1903)
- Some Irish Yesterdays (1906)
- Further Experiences of an Irish R.M. (1908)
- Dan Russell the Fox (1911)
- In Mr Knox's Country (1915)

=== Solo Works ===
- Irish Memories (1917)
- Mount Music (1919)
- An Enthusiast (1921)
- Wheel-Tracks (1923) - nonfiction
- The Big House of Inver (1925)
- French Leave (1928)
- The States through Irish Eyes (1930)
- An Incorruptible Irishman (1932)
- The Smile and the Tear (1933)
- The Sweet Cry of Hounds (1936)
- Sarah's Youth (1938)
- Maria and Some Other Dogs (1949)
