= Richard Townsend (soldier) =

Richard Townesend (as he spelt his name) was a soldier and politician in England. He was born in 1618 or 1619. Much research has been undertaken by various members of the Townsend family to trace Richard's origins but nothing is known about him before 1643 when he was appointed to command a company, as a captain, in Colonel Ceely's Regiment, which had been raised to garrison Lyme Regis. Richard was engaged in several skirmishes, most notably on 3 March 1643 when he surprised and routed 150 Royalist cavalry at Bridport. Later, he was present during the defence of Lyme Regis 20 April – 13 June 1644 where he distinguished himself and was promoted to Major ("he was shot in the head but still lives"). In 1645 he assumed command of Colonel Ceely's Regt when Colonel Ceely was returned to Parliament as Member of Parliament (MP) for Bridport.

Richard took part in the siege of Pendennis Castle in August 1646 and afterwards wrote to Colonel Ceely to report on the siege and "to receive directions how to dispose of the regiment, and positively what employment and future maintenance we may expect". This letter is preserved in the Tanner MS in the Bodleian Library, Oxford. Following the siege, Richard was made Colonel of a regiment of 1000 men, raised for service in Ireland, with Robert Phayre as his Lieutenant Colonel and they remained camped near Bath until 19 June 1647 when Parliament ordered that "Colonel Townesend and his regiment ... be transported to Ireland" to join the Parliamentary Army in Ireland under the command of Murrough O'Brien, 1st Earl of Inchiquin.

== Ireland ==
On 13 November 1647, Richard commanded the main body of the infantry at the Battle of Knocknanauss, near Mallow under Lord Inchiquin against the Irish army led by Theobald Taaffe, 1st Earl of Carlingford. Subsequently, Richard and others, in dire need of fresh supplies, joined with Lord Inchiquin in a Declaration of Remonstrance, which was submitted to Parliament in early 1648. Shortly after this Lord Inchiquin renounced his allegiance to the English Parliament and joined forces with Lord Taaff. Richard and several other officers disagreed with this and there followed a period of complex political and military intrigue during which loyalties to the Parliamentary cause and the Royalists were in a state of flux.

The execution of Charles I on 30 January 1649 united all the factions in Ireland against Cromwell, but Richard and a number of other officers in Inchiquin's army (notably Colonel Gifford and Colonel Warden) were unable "to endure the thought of joining with the Irish against their own countrymen" and declared for Cromwell, who, having suppressed the uprisings in Kent, Wales and Scotland, was now in Ireland and marching on Munster. As Richard and the other Colonels were preparing Youghal to receive Cromwell, they were betrayed to Lord Inchiquin who arrested and imprisoned them in Cork. They were freed when the garrison in the town rose up in support of Cromwell on 16 October 1649, Later that month the 'Protestant Army of Munster' based in Cork drew up a Resolution to send to Cromwell pleading that they had been forced by Lord Inchiquin to serve the Irish cause. The first signature on the Resolution is that of Richard and Cromwell, on 14 November 1649, wrote to Speaker Lenthall that Colonel Townesend had been "an active instrument for the return of both Cork and Youghal to their obedience".

== Post-military life ==
Richard retired from service sometime before 1654 and made extensive purchases of land; in all about 8,000 acres (32 km^{2}). Following the restoration of Charles II in 1666 he was pardoned and hence escaped the forfeitures placed on many Cromwellian soldiers. His purchases of land were subsequently confirmed by royal patents in 1666, 1668 and 1680. He lived for a time at Kilbrittain Castle, near Courtmacsherry before finally settling at Castletown in about 1665. Castletown later came to be called Castle Townsend and from about 1870 Castletownshend.

Richard was elected MP for Baltimore in the Irish Parliament, which met at Chichester House, Dublin in 1661. His appearances in the Parliament were infrequent and he was fined for non-attendance.

In 1666, under threat of invasion by the French, the Duke of Ormonde, at the insistence of the Earl of Orrery, appointed Richard Commander of Militia in County Cork. Subsequently, he was appointed High Sheriff of County Cork on 12 March 1671 and Sovereign of Clonakilty on 18 October 1685. From the time that he moved from Kilbrittain Castle to Castletownshend until his death Richard sought to consolidate his estates in West Carberry and to lead the settled life of a landowner. However, these were unsettled times, particularly after the accession of James II in 1685, and Richard was frequently engaged in various armed skirmishes with Irish rebels. In 1690, under the command of Colonel O'Driscol, the rebels unsuccessfully besieged Castletownshend but soon after it was attacked again by about 500 of them led by MacFineen O'Driscoll and Richard was forced to surrender. He was subsequently paid £40,000 in compensation for the destruction of his home.

Richard signed his will on 21 June 1692 "being sick in body but in perfect sense and disposing memory". He died on 26 September 1692 and was buried in the old churchyard at Castlehaven; his tomb lies in the chancel of the old church and is marked by a slab bearing the words 'This is the burial place of the Townesends'.

It has always been the belief that Richard's first wife, Hildegardis Hyde, was a close kinswoman of Lord Clarendon; if this is correct it might help to explain how Richard's life and lands were spared during these troubled times when many of his friends and acquaintances fared very badly. The surname of Richard's second wife cannot be confirmed but there are good reasons to believe it to be Kingston; the Kingston family were settled near Bandon and Richard named his fifth son Kingston.

Richard had a large family of which there were seven surviving sons. Of these, it is only through his son Colonel Bryan Townsend that survivors in the male line exist today.
