= HMS Research =

Three ships of the Royal Navy have borne the name HMS Research. A fourth was planned and launched, but never entered service:

- HMS Research (1846) was a tender purchased in 1846 and broken up in 1859.
- HMS Research (1863) was an ironclad screw sloop built as HMS Trent but renamed in 1862 and launched in 1863. She was sold in 1884.
- HMS Research (1888) was a paddle survey vessel built as HMS Investigator but renamed in 1887 and launched in 1888. She was sold in 1920.
- HMS Research was to have been a survey vessel. She was launched in 1939 but was not completed, and was scrapped in 1952.
