= Castletownshend =

Village in County Cork, Ireland

Castletownshend Baile an Chaisleáin
- Village
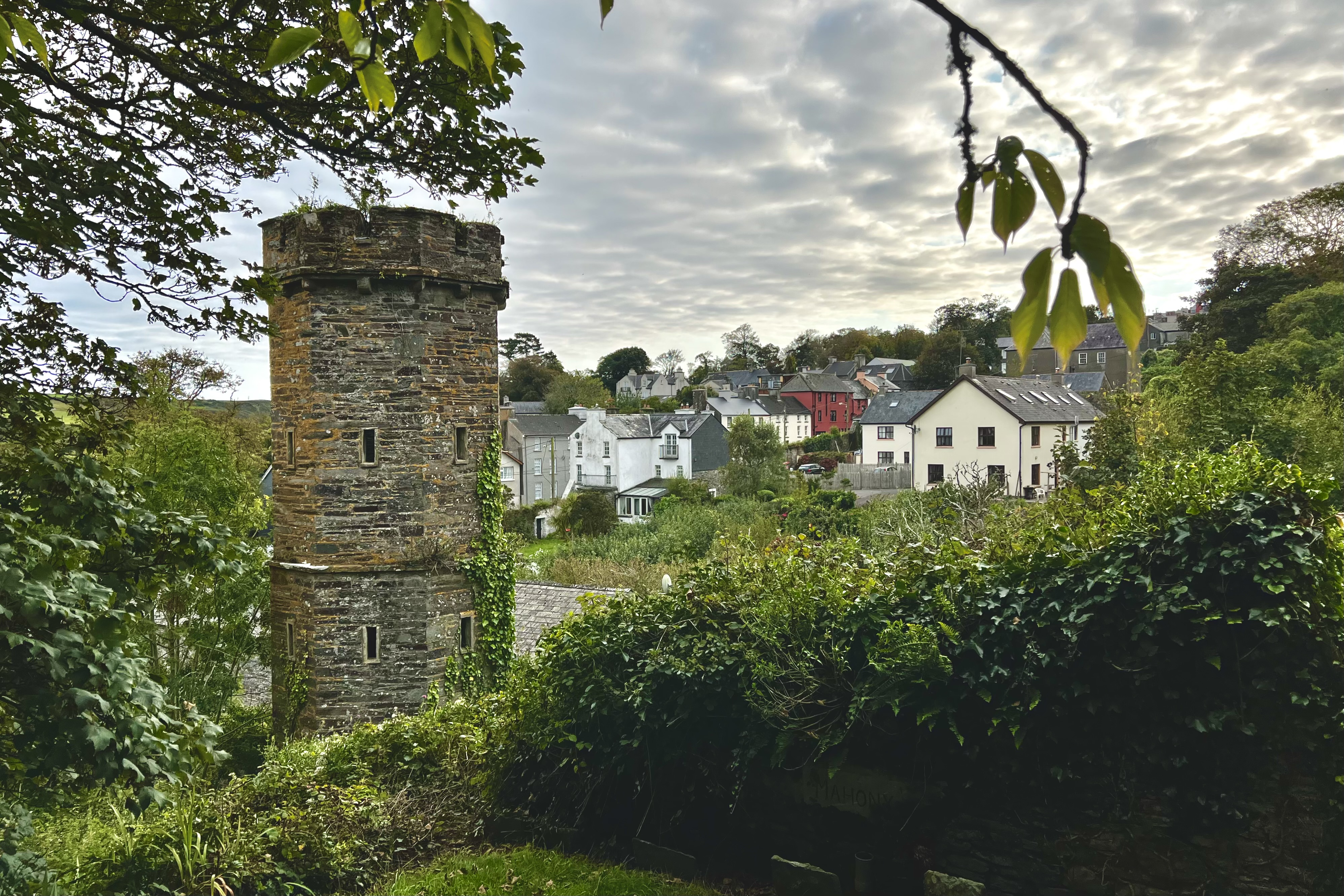
- Castletownshend village seen from St Barrahane's Church

- Location in Ireland
- Coordinates: 51°32′N 9°11′W
- Country: Ireland
- Province: Munster
- County: County Cork

Population (2022)
  - Total: 164
- Time zone: UTC+0 (WET)
  - Summer (DST): UTC-1 (IST (WEST))

Castletownshend (Irish: Baile an Chaisleáin, meaning 'town of the castle') is a village about 8 km (5 mi) south-east of Skibbereen, in County Cork, Ireland. The village developed around a small 17th-century castle built by Richard Townsend.

== History ==
Evidence of ancient settlement in the area includes a number of ringfort, fulacht fiadh, standing stone and bullaun stone sites in the townlands of Castletownsend, Drishane, Gurranes and Farrandau.

The modern village developed around a fortified country house, originally built by Richard Townsend c. 1650, which was extended in the 19th century. The main street of the town, lined with large homes from the 18th century, runs down a sharply sloped hill leading to Castlehaven Harbour and the castle.

Drishane House, another large country house which is historically associated with the Somerville family, dates to c. 1790.

The village's Church of Ireland (Anglican) church, the Church of St Barrahane, was built in 1827 and overlooks the town. The local Catholic church, also dedicated to Saint Barrahane, was built c. 1840 to the northwest of the village.

== Demographics ==
As of the 2022 census, Castletownshend had a population of 164. Of these, 73.2% were born in Ireland, 17.1% in the United Kingdom, 1.2% in Poland, 4.9% in other EU countries excluding Ireland and Poland, and 3.7% in the rest of the world.

== People ==
- Edith Somerville (1858–1949) lived in Castletownsend. She was one half of the writing duo Somerville and Ross, who together authored the Irish RM series of humorous novels on Irish life in the early 1900s.
- Sir Patrick Buckley (1841–1896), who became Attorney-General of New Zealand, was born in the area.

== See also ==
- List of towns and villages in the Republic of Ireland
