= Somerville and Ross =

Literary collaborative partnership, Irish writers

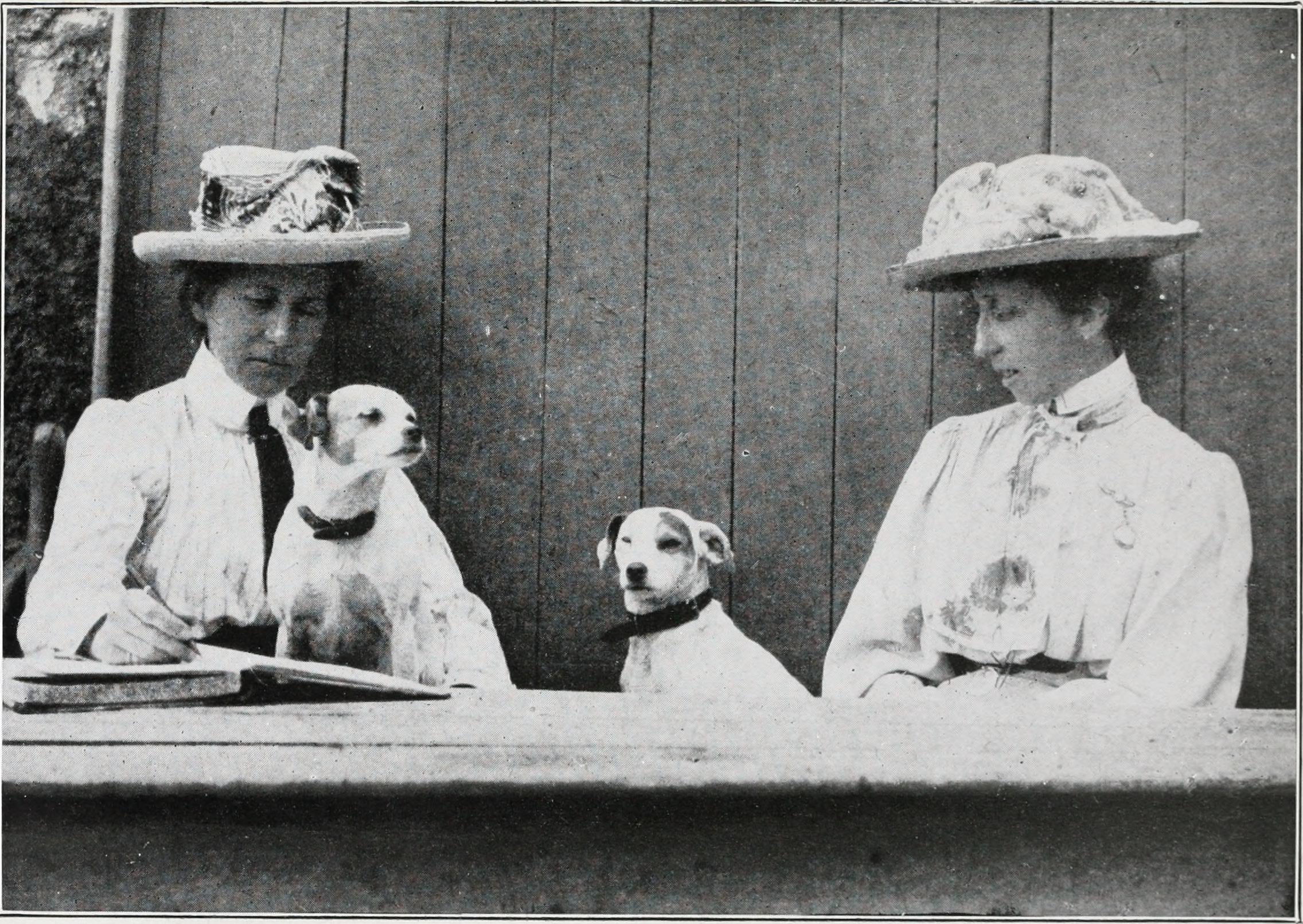
Photograph of Edith Somerville (left) and Violet Florence Martin (right), from Irish Memories (1919)

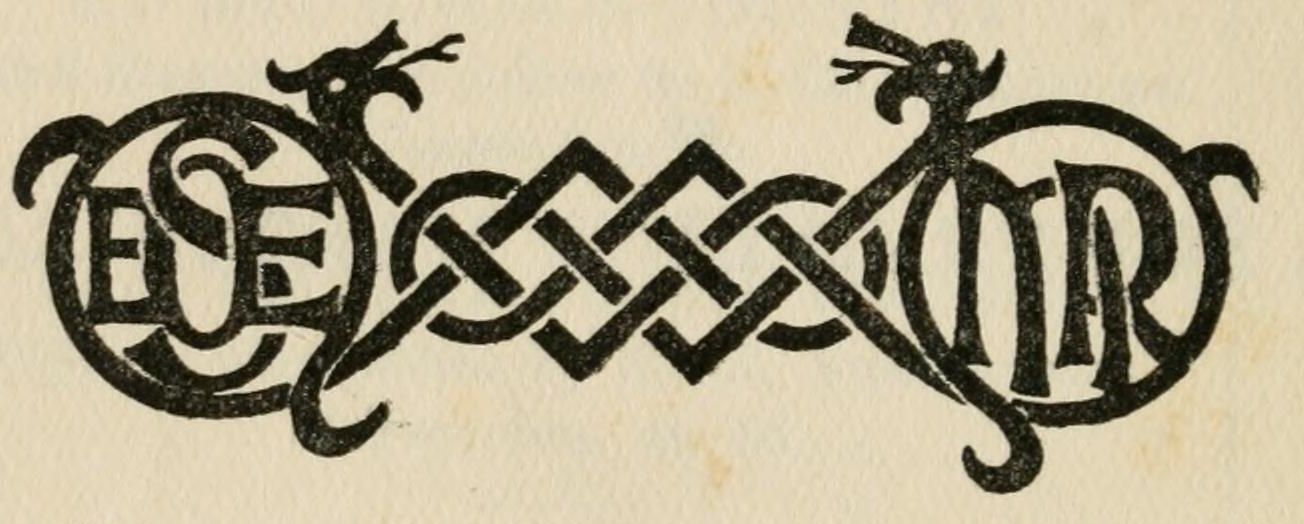
Paired monograms from a 1915 edition of The Real Charlotte: "E.Œ.S." and "M.R."

Somerville and Ross (Edith Somerville and Violet Florence Martin, writing under the name Martin Ross) were an Anglo-Irish writing team, perhaps most famous for their series of books that were made into the TV series The Irish R.M.. The television series is based on stories drawn from Some Experiences of an Irish RM, Further Experiences of an Irish RM and In Mr Knox's Country. The various stories concern the life of an Anglo-Irish former British Army officer recently appointed as a resident magistrate (R.M.) in Ireland, which at that stage was still wholly a part of the United Kingdom of Great Britain and Ireland, some years before its partition into the Irish Free State (now the Republic of Ireland) and Northern Ireland.

Somerville and Ross also wrote other work together, including the novel The Real Charlotte (1894), considered their masterpiece. Even after the death of "Ross" in 1915, Somerville continued to write and publish stories under their joint names, claiming that the two were still in contact. The Big House of Inver, a novel of 1925, falls into that category.

The precise nature of their relationship – whether they were romantic and sexual partners as well as literary collaborators and friends – has been the object of speculation by later writers.

== Collaborative works ==
- An Irish Cousin (1889)
- Naboth's Vineyard (1891)
- In the Vine Country (1893)
- Through Connemara in a Governess Cart (1893)
- The Real Charlotte (1894)
- Beggars on Horseback (1895)
- The Silver Fox (1897)
- Some Experiences of an Irish R. M. (1899)
- A Patrick's Day Hunt (1902)
- All on the Irish Shore (1903)
- Further Experiences of an Irish R.M. (1908)
- Dan Russell the Fox (1911)
- In Mr Knox's Country (1915)
