= List of commanders of the LTTE =

The following is a list of commanders of the Liberation Tigers of Tamil Eelam (LTTE), also known as the Tamil Tigers, a separatist militant Tamil nationalist organisation, which operated in northern and eastern Sri Lanka from the late 1970s to May 2009, until it was defeated by the Sri Lankan Military.

Nom de Guerre	Real Name	Date & Place of Birth	Date & Place of Death	Position(s)	Notes
Thambi (used only by closest associates), Anna (elder brother) and Karikalan(another name)	Velupillai; Prabhakaran †	26 November 1954; Valvettithurai	18 May 2009 (aged 54); Vellamullivaikkal	Leader of the LTTE	Supreme leader of the LTTE, which waged a 25-year civil war in Sri Lanka against the Sri Lankan government. His death in Nanthikadal lagoon, Vellamullivaikkal, Mullaitivu, brought an immediate end to the Sri Lankan Civil War.
Lt. Colonel Bharathan	Barathan Rajanayagam	6 December 1960; Thirunelveli	18 March 2021 (aged 60); London, United Kingdom	Founder of Nitharsanam and Pulikalin Kural	Major Commander of the LTTE, Bharathan pushed for the formation of a media division of the LTTE. He created Nitharsanam (meaning reality in truth, it was the television and newspaper department of the LTTE) and Pulikalin Kural (meaning the tigers' voice, it was the radio for the LTTE). Bharathan’s fearless style of cinematography allowed the LTTE to showcase live footage of the battlefield locally and globally. The rapid growth of the LTTE and their following abroad is largely credited to the success of their Media outlet.
Pottu Amman alias Papa Oscar alias Sobhigemoorthy alias Kailan alias Kuruvi	Shanmugalingam Shivashankar †	1962; Nayanmarkaddu	18 May 2009 (aged 47); Vellamullivaikkal	Leader of Tiger Organization Security Intelligence Service (TOSIS) and Black Tigers	Second-in-command of the LTTE. His death was initially disputed because the body was not found. But in October 2010, TADA court judge K. Dakshinamurthy dropped charges against Amman, on the Assassination of Rajiv Gandhi, accepting the CBI's report on his demise.
Selvarasa Pathmanathan (POW) alias Kumaran Pathmanathan alias KP (23+ aliases)	Shanmugam Kumaran Tharmalingam	6 April 1955; Kankesanthurai		Leader of the LTTE since the death of Prabhakaran. Prior to that, served as the chief procurer of arms and head of the "Department of International Relations" of the LTTE	As the chief arms procurer since the origin of the organisation, Pathmanathan was involved in all the vital administrative issues of the LTTE. He held 200+ passports with himself. On 21 July 2009, the Executive Committee of the LTTE, issued a statement announcing that Patmanathan had been appointed leader of the LTTE. But on 5 August 2009, Sri Lankan intelligence agents with the aid of the local authorities, captured Pathmanathan in Malaysia and deported him to Sri Lanka.
Colonel Karuna Amman	Vinayagamoorthy Muralitharan	1966; Kiran, Batticaloa		LTTE leader of the Eastern Province	Major commander of the LTTE. He was involved in many successful LTTE attacks including the Second Battle of Elephant Pass. In March 2004, he broke away from the Tamil Tigers and claimed to renounce violence. In 2007, he created the political party TMVP. In 2008, he was appointed as a National List Member of Parliament. Later, he was sworn in as Minister of National Integration.
Lt. Seelan †	Charles Lucas Anthony	Church Street, Trincomalee	15 July 1983; Meesalai	Second-in-command of LTTE as of 1983	Prabhakaran's right-hand man in the early stages of the LTTE. He was instrumental in the transformation of the LTTE from an armed criminal gang to a deadly military force. Seelan's death on 15 July 1983 prompted Prabhakaran to ambush the Sri Lanka Army patrol Four Four Bravo to avenge his death. The killing of 13 soldiers on 23 July 1983, resulted in the Black July ethnic riots, which marked the beginning of 26-year civil war. Prabhakaran paid tribute to Seelan by naming his elder son and the premier fighting brigade of LTTE after him.
Colonel Kittu †	Sathasivam Krishnakumar	2 January 1960; Velvettithurai	16 January 1993 (aged 33); Indian Ocean	Second-in-Command of LTTE, Leader of shipping	Second-in-Command of the LTTE in the 1980s. He became crippled in a shoot-out in 1987. In 1993, Kittu committed suicide before he could be captured by the Indian Navy.
Mahattaya	Gopalaswamy Mahendraraja	1956; Point Pedro	28 December 1994 (aged 38); Chavakacheri	Second-in-Command of LTTE (1987–1993), Leader of People's Front of Liberation Tigers, Political wing of LTTE	The LTTE intelligence wing found that Mahattaya was leaking information to India's Research and Analysis Wing, and plotting to assassinate Prabhakaran. He was arrested in March 1993, and executed in December 1994, on Prabhakaran’s orders. It was said that Mahattaya, along with nearly 257 cadres who were loyal to him, were lined up in a coconut estate located near Chavakacheri and shot, and their bodies dumped.
Thamilselvan	S. P. Thamilselvan	29 August 1967; Chavakacheri	2 November 2007 (aged 40); Kilinochchi	Political leader of LTTE	One of the prominent negotiators of LTTE. Killed by a precise Sri Lanka Air Force bombing targeting him.
Colonel Shankar	Vaithilingam Sornalingam †	September 1949	26 September 2001 (aged 52); Oddusuddan	Founder and leader of the air wing and marine division of LTTE	Shankar was a relative and one of the closest lieutenants of LTTE leader Prabhakaran. He was killed by a claymore attack of the Sri Lankan Army’s deep penetration unit in 2001.
Admiral Colonel Soosai †	Thillaiyampalam Sivanesan	16 October 1963	18 May 2009 (aged 45); Vellamullivaikkal	Head of the Sea Tigers, naval wing of the LTTE	Responsible for many successful attacks against the Sri Lanka Navy. He narrowly escaped during the Vadamarachchi Operation, but was killed during the Sri Lanka Army's final onslaught towards LTTE held areas in 2009.
Brigadier Balraj alias Leema	Balasegaram Kandiah	27 November 1965; Kokkuththoduvai	18 May 2008 (aged 42); Vellamullivaikkal	Commander of the Charles Antony Brigade	Responsible for many successful operations, including the Second Battle of Elephant Pass. Died of a sudden heart attack in 2008.
Brigadier Theepan † alias Tango Papa	Velayuthapillai Baheerathakumar	1965; Vavuniya	5 April 2009 (aged 44); Aanandapuram	Overall military commander of LTTE in the final phase of Sri Lankan Civil War	Posthumously promoted to Brigadier. He was a native of Thenmarachi division of Jaffna District. He joined LTTE in 1984 and eventually became a senior commander. He participated and led a number of battles against the Sri Lankan Army. He was killed along with 615 others in early April 2009 in Puthukkudiyiruppu (Mullaitivu). Before his death he was the unofficial military commander of the LTTE Northern fighting formations.
Rathnam Master †			18 May 2009; Vellamullivaikkal	Head of LTTE Military Intelligence wing, head of the air wing and the Radha Brigade	A personal bodyguard of Prabhakaran; led the LTTE military wing after Colonel Theepan was killed in April 2009.
Mathavan Master †	Ragunathan Pathmanathan	1958; Alaveddy	18 May 2009 (aged 50); Vellamullivaikkal	Head of LTTE Intelligence Training Centre, Training and Technology Department, Research & Publications Department.	Senior member of the Tiger Organization Security Intelligence Service (TOSIS). He joined the LTTE in 1987. He was responsible for the training and development of advanced technologies for support of both the National and Military Intelligence: modifying weapons, explosive-filled vehicles, spy tools, etc. He also undertook the task of training TOSIS operatives. He was killed while fighting in Vellamullivaikkal, Mullaitivu in 2009 and his body was recovered by the SLA, which listed him as the LTTE Internal Intelligence leader.
Kapil Amman †	Rajadurai Selvaraja	11.11.1957 Trincomalee	18 May 2009; Vellamullivaikkal	Deputy leader of Tiger Organization Security Intelligence Service (TOSIS)	Long-time deputy of the LTTE intelligence head Pottu Amman.
Nadesan	Balasingham Nadesan		18 May 2009; Vellamullivaikkal	Political leader of LTTE (Since November 2007), Chief of LTTE Police	Police Chief of the LTTE. He also held the position of political leader since the death of S. P. Thamilselvan in 2007. Nadesan was killed on 18 May 2009 in Vellamullivaikkal, Mullaitivu.
Brigadier Bhanu (Banu) alias Bravo †	Sivanadan Somasekaran	1960	18 May 2009 (aged 49); Vellamullivaikkal	Leader of the LTTE's Mortar wing	Led the LTTE's Kutti Sri Mortar Regiment and Johnson Mortar Regiment in the Second Battle of Elephant Pass and hoisted the LTTE flag at the Elephant Pass base in 2000. He later became the leader of the Kutti Sri Mortar regiment. He was killed during the final battle of the war, on 18 May 2009.
Colonel Charles †	Shanmuganathan Ravishankar	1965	6 January 2008 (aged 43); Mannar District	Head of LTTE Military Intelligence wing	Killed by a Sri Lankan Army LRRP unit in 2008. He was involved in the planning of the Central Bank bombing and many other successful Black Tiger attacks.
Colonel Ramesh † alias Romeo Siera	T. Thurairajasingham		18 May 2009; Vellamullivaikkal	Batticaloa District & Ampara District commander	LTTE commander for the Batticaloa and Ampara districts during the 2002 ceasefire era. Believed to have been killed on 18 May 2009.
Colonel Sornam (Swarnam) †	Soosapillai Joseph Anthonydas	1 April 1964; Trincomalee	16 May 2009 (aged 45); Vellamullivaikkal	LTTE leader of Trincomalee	Personal bodyguard of LTTE leader Velupillai Prabhakaran, and a senior commander of the LTTE. Believed to have been killed in May 2009.
Pulidevan †	Seevaratnam Pulidevan		18 May 2009; Vellamullivaikkal	Head of the LTTE Peace Secretariat	Member of the LTTE negotiating team during peace talks.
Shashikumar Master †	Mithiran Selvarathnam		18 May 2009; Vellamullivaikkal	Head of the LTTE mapping and surveying division	Died during the final battle on 18 May 2009.
Daya Master (POW)	Velayutham Dayanidhi			Head of the LTTE media division	Surrendered to the Sri Lankan Army during the final stages of the war.
George Master (POW)	Velupillai Kumaru Pancharatnam			Translator of LTTE leader Prabhakaran and S. P. Thamilsenvan	Surrendered to the Sri Lankan Army towards the end of the war.
Brigadier Gadaffi †		1961	5 April 2009 (aged 48); Aanandapuram	Head of LTTE military school	Senior commander of the LTTE. He was from Nelliyady. He was killed in early April 2009 in Puthukkudiyiruppu (Mullaitivu). At the time of his death, he was the head of Tamil Tiger military school. He also functioned as either deputy or leader of some of the Tamil Tiger military divisions. It is claimed that Gadaffi brought down several Sri Lankan Air Force aircraft using shoulder fired SAM-7 missiles.
Colonel Jeyam (Jayam) †			21 April 2009; Mullaitivu District		A senior LTTE commander, originally from the east of Sri Lanka. He was a member of the LTTE delegation that attended the Geneva peace talks between the LTTE and the Government of Sri Lanka. He is not to be confused with a TMVP commander by the same name, who is also from the east of Sri Lanka.
Colonel Ilankeeran † alias A Chetan alias AC alias Ravi		1972; Batticaloa	19 March 2009; Aanandapuram	Special commander and later appointed as Leader of the Victor anti-tank regiment	Served as the special commander and leader of Victor anti-armor/tank regiment from 2006–2009. He led these forces when it was first formed in LTTE's counter attack of Operation Jayasikuru (1997), and led the forces in the decisive battles of Elephant Pass under Brigadier Balraj (1999–2000). He was killed along with 17 others in early March 2009 in Puthukkudiyiruppu (Mullaitivu)
Colonel Raju alias Kuyilan	Ambalavanar Neminathan	Elalai, Jaffna	25 August 2002		Served as the special commander of the elite LTTE Leopard Commandos and played a key role in developing its artillery wing.
Captain Ram	Ramesh Arivazhagan K.	1980, Jaffna		Commander of Jaffna District	The former LTTE commander for the Trincomalee District during the 2002 ceasefire period.
Colonel Ramanan †	Kandiah Ulaganathan	1966; Palukamam, Batticaloa	21 May 2006 (aged 40); Vavunathivu		LTTE explosives expert.
Nediyavan	Perinpanayagam Sivaparan			LTTE leader of Norway	With the demise of LTTE in May 2009, Nediyavan appeared as the military leader of the LTTE. He was apprehended by Norwegian authorities in May 2011.
Brigadier Thurka †			5 April 2009; Aanandapuram	Commander of Sothiya Regiment	A female commander of the LTTE, she was the leader of the all-female Sothiya Regiment. Reported to have been killed on 5 April 2009 during the Battle of Aanandapuram.
Brigadier Vithusha †			5 April 2009; Aanandapuram	Commander of Malathi Regiment	A female commander of the LTTE, and the leader of the all-female Malathi Regiment. Reported to have been killed on 5 April 2009 during the Battle of Aanandapuram.
Lt. Colonel Akbar †	Veerapathirar Pernibarasa		7 October 2006; Muhamalai FDL	Leader of the Victor anti-tank regiment	Killed on 7 October 2006 at the Muhamalai Forward Defence Line.
Lt. Colonel Amuthab †			5 April 2009; Aanandapuram	Charles Anthony Brigade commander	Senior LTTE commander, and the head of the Charles Anthony Brigade. Killed in April 2009 in the Battle of Aanandapuram.
Lt. Colonel Appaiah	I. Rasiah		24 December 1997		Known as the 'Scientist of the LTTE'.
Lt. Colonel Arivu †				Trincomalee District	Senior commander of the LTTE, served in Charles Anthony Brigade as a senior commander. Believed to have been in killed in Trincomalee District in the mid 2000s.
Lt. Colonel Gobith †			5 April 2009; Aanandapuram	Commander of Charles Anthony Brigade	Senior LTTE commander; head of the Charles Anthony Brigade. Killed in April 2009 in the Battle of Aanandapuram.
Lt. Colonel Kumarappa †	B. Rathnapalan		5 October 1987; Palali		He was taken into custody by Sri Lanka Navy along with 16 others at sea, and brought to a Sri Lanka Army base in Palali. When the Sri Lanka Army attempted to take the detainees to Colombo for interrogation, he committed suicide on 5 October 1987.
Lt. Colonel Lawrence †			16 May 2009; Vellamullivaikkal		He was a senior commander of the LTTE, he served in the northern front. It is believed that he was killed in May 2009.
Colonel Nakulan † (Nagulan)			May 2007; Eastern Province		He was a senior commander of the Tamil Tigers; served in the Charles Anthony Brigade as a senior commander. Believed to have been killed in eastern Sri Lanka in May 2007.
Lt. Colonel Nizam †	Thambirasa Kuhasanthan		2001; Mullaitivu District	Head of Military Intelligence (East)	LTTE military intelligence wing leader for the east of Sri Lanka. He was killed by a Sri Lanka Army LRRP unit in 2001.
Lt. Colonel Ponnamman †	Yogaratnam Kugan		1987; Navatkuly		Graduate of Jaffna Hindu College and a college all-rounder. He was killed in 1987 in an explosion during an attempt to attack the Sri Lanka Army camp in Navatkuly, Jaffna.
Lt. Colonel Pulendran †	K. Dharmarajah		10 October 1987; Palali	Trincomalee District commander	One of the early members of the LTTE. He was the military commander in the Trincomalee District. He was the head of the unit responsible for the Aluth Oya massacre in April 1987. He committed suicide as the Army attempted to take him to Colombo for interrogation, after being apprehended.
Lt Colonel Radha †	Anthony Kaththiar	Arialai, Jaffna		Mannar District commander	Mannar District commander of the Tamil Tigers following Victor's death. While under Victor's command, he organized and executed the Anuradhapura massacre. He has been credited with many attack against Sri Lankan forces. He was killed in the late 1980s. The Radha Regiment is named in honour of him.
Lt. Colonel Santhosham †	K. Umainesan		21 October 1987; Kondavil		Killed on 21 October 1987 at Kondavil in Jaffna in a battle with the IPKF. He was active in the Trincomalee District of Sri Lanka. He was from Ariyalai, Jaffna District, Sri Lanka.
Lt. Colonel Thileepan	Rasaiah Parthipan	1962	26 September 1987 (aged 25); Jaffna		Died during a hunger strike against the IPKF operations in Sri Lanka.
Lt. Colonel Veeramani †	Subramaniam Vadivel		24 May 2006		He was a senior commander of the LTTE, he was killed in an accidental explosion on 24 May 2006. He served as a senior commander in the Charles Anthony Brigade and Tamil Tiger northern forces. He was from Vavuniya District.
Lt. Colonel Victor †	Marcelin Fuselus		1984	Mannar District commander	He was a Mannar District commander of the Tamil Tigers, until he was killed in October 1986 by the Sri Lanka Army. He ordered the infamous Anuradhapura massacre, which killed 146 Sinhalese civilians in May 1985. The Victor Anti Tank and Armoured Unit of the LTTE was named after him.
Major Mano †			2001	Head of Communications (East)	The LTTE's head of eastern communications, he was killed by a Sri Lanka Army LRRP unit in 2001.
Captain Miller †	Vallipuram Vasanthan	1 January 1966	5 July 1987 (aged 21)		First Black Tiger for the LTTE. He drove a small truck laden with explosives into a Sri Lanka Army camp in Nelliady MMV, Karaveddy in Jaffna peninsula, killing himself and 128 Sri Lankan soldiers.
Captain Pandithar †	S. Ravindran		9 January 1985		He was a childhood friend of Velupillai Prabhakaran and was the LTTE's accredited vice captain. He was killed by the Sri Lanka Army on 9 January 1985.
Lieutenant Sellakil i †	Sathasivam Selvanayakam		23 July 1983; Thirunelveli		He was the only LTTE cadre to be killed in an ambush in Thirunelveli in Jaffna that killed 13 Sri Lanka Army soldiers on 23 July 1983, the incident that sparked the Black July riots across the country. He was the leader of the group that carried out the attack.
Lt.Conol Cheliyan †			October 2008? May 2009?	Deputy Leader, Sea Tigers	He was a Sea Tiger deputy leader. It is claimed that a Sri Lankan Army LRRP killed him in October 2008. However, there were reports that he was killed in May 2009.
Lt.Conol Gangai Amaran †			2001	Deputy Leader, Sea Tigers	He was a deputy Sea Tiger commander. He was killed along with his family by a Sri Lanka Army LRRP unit in 2001.
Colonel Gopal †	Nadarasa Dushiyanthan		5 April 2009; Aanandapuram	2nd Commander of Kutti Sri mortar regiment	He was a senior commander of the LTTE and was also the leader of Kutti Sri Mortar Unit. He participated in many battles against the Sri Lankan Army, was killed in early April 2009 in Puthukkudiyiruppu (Mullaitivu).
Colonel Keerthi †	Manikkapodi Easwaran		5 April 2009; Aanandapuram	Head of Intelligence, Batticaloa District	He was a senior commander of the Tamil Tigers, he was killed in early April 2009 in Puthukkudiyiruppu (Mullaitivu). He was from Batticaloa District and served as the Tamil Tiger intelligence chief there. He also served in the Jeyanthan Brigade as a senior commander.
Marshall †	Irasaiah Ilanthirayan			LTTE spokesperson	He was the LTTE's military spokesperson and was often in contact with international media during the immediate post-ceasefire era.
Colonel Nagesh †	Selvarathnam Sundaram	15 January 1970; Batticaloa District	5 April 2009 (aged 39); Aanandapuram		He was a senior commander of the LTTE, participated in may battles against the Sri Lankan Army in the east and north of Sri Lanka. He was killed in early April 2009 in Puthukkudiyiruppu (Mullaitivu). He was a senior commander of the Jeyanthan Brigade.
	Ramalingam Paramadeva †		1984	Senior leader, Batticaloa	One of the architects of the 1983 Batticaloa Jailbreak.
Major Sothiya (Sothia) †	Maria Vasanthi Michael	20 September 1963	11 January 1990 (aged 26)		She died of illness in 1990 and had one of the female fighting formations of the LTTE, the Sothiya Regiment, named after her.
Captain Morris †	Paratharajan Thiyagarajah	12 September 1969	1 May 1989 (aged 19); Point Pedro	Point Pedro District Leader	He was in charge of Point Pedro area & was killed in May 1989 in the battle of military offensives of Indian Peace Keeping Forces (IPKF). It was during that difficult time Col.Charles functioning under the leadership of Captain Morris who was in charge of Point Pedro area, faced the military offensives of Indian Peace Keeping Forces (IPKF).
Lt.Conol Jonny (MO) †	Viyakumar	12 September 1962	1 May 1988 (aged 18); Point Pedro	Point Pedro District Leader	He was in charge of Point Pedro area & was killed in May 1989 in the battle of military offensives of Indian Peace Keeping Forces (IPKF). Jony who was killed by IPKF on his way back to India after meeting LTTE chief Velupillai Prabhakaran at his Manal Aru hideout. (IPKF).
Lt. Col. Bhutto †	Kanakaratnam Stanley Julian	25 July 1974 Mannar District	11 August 2006 (aged 32)		Julian, escapes from Indian forces in Sri Lanka and joins a militant movement fighting for Tamil Eelam. Julian goes through intense training and becomes a skilled fighter, leader, and strategist. He uses his talents in painting, poetry, and singing to entertain and inspire his fellow soldiers. Julian becomes known as "Bhutto" and is tasked with coordinating attacks and leading teams. He plays a key role in the successful defeat of enemy camps in Mullaitivu but also faces danger and injury.
Lt. Col. Johnson †	Junaideen	22 August 1963 Ottumadam, Jaffna District	30 November 1985 (aged 22)		

== See also ==
- Black July
- Liberation Tigers of Tamil Eelam
- 1987 Suicide of Tamil Tigers
- Long Range Reconnaissance Patrol (Sri Lanka)
- List of Sri Lankan Civil War battles
