= Balraj =

Sri Lankan militant (1965–2008)

Brigadier Balraj
- Born: 27 November 1965; Kokkuththoduvai, Sri Lanka
- Died: 20 May 2008 (aged 42); Mullaithivu, Sri Lanka
- Other name: Liima(Military code name)
- Occupation: Tamil militant
- Known for: Conventional warfare Psychological warfare Attack on Elephant Pass
- Spouses: Lt. Col Varathaa (Died due to snake bite)
- Military service
- Allegiance: Tamil Eelam
- Branch: Liberation Tigers of Tamil Eelam
- Service years: 1984 –2008
- Commands: Deputy Military Commander of LTTE
- Conflicts: Sri Lankan Civil War: Eelam War I, between 1983 and 1987; Indian intervention in the Sri Lankan Civil War, between 1987 and 1990; Eelam War II, between 1990 and 1995; Eelam War III, between 1995 and 2002; Eelam War IV, between 2006 and 2008

Brigadier Balraj (born Balasegaram Kandiah) was a senior commander of the Liberation Tigers of Tamil Eelam (LTTE). He is widely regarded as the finest field commander the LTTE ever had, due to his role in spearheading several successful military operations on the frontlines against both the Sri Lankan Army and Indian Peace Keeping Force, despite being overwhelmed numerically and logistically.

== Early life ==
Balraj was born on 27 November 1965, in the coastal area of Kokkuthoduvai in the Mullaitivu District. He was the fourth in a family of four boys and a girl. He received his primary education in Kokkuthoduvai and his secondary education in Pulmoddai, Trincomalee. After he passed his O levels, his parents wanted to send him to university; however, they were unable to do so due to widespread anti-Tamil violence that plagued the island during the early 1980's.

== Eelam War 1 ==
Balraj was recruited by the People's Liberation Organisation of Tamil Eelam (PLOTE) at the age of 19. PLOTE differed from the Liberation Tigers of Tamil Eelam (LTTE, the primary Tamil nationalist organisation) in tactics, favouring the widespread formation of sleeper cells over the LTTE's hit-and-run tactics. As a result, Balraj grew frustrated as he had little opportunity to fight in open combat. In 1984, he voluntarily switched allegiances and contacted a school teacher who was an LTTE recruiter. Despite his PLOTE background, Balraj was accepted into the LTTE and given military training in Tamil Nadu under the guidance of Indian intelligence. Balraj returned to Jaffna in 1986 and immediately made his mark in combat. That same year, he played an active role in taking over the Karadipokku junction in Kilinochchi in what was an abortive bid by the LTTE to encircle the Kilinochchi military camp. Balraj was later appointed as deputy military commander of Mullaitivu district and led an ambush at Munthirikaikkulam, killing 14 Sri Lankan soldiers.

== Indian Intervention ==
The Indo-Lanka Accord of July 1987 brought about a temporary peace when Indian troops known as the Indian Peace Keeping Force (IPKF) were deployed in the north and east. The fragile peace was shattered in October 1987 when fighting erupted between the IPKF and the LTTE, resulting in the Indian Army launching Operation Pawan against the LTTE in Jaffna. Tiger cadres led by Paseelan, with Balraj as his deputy, were hastily deployed in Jaffna to combat the IPKF. It was then that Balraj, armed with an RPG, demonstrated great courage by severely damaging an advancing battle tank in Kopay. After several weeks of intense fighting, the IPKF wrestled Jaffna from the LTTE and forced the Tiger leadership to relocate to the Vanni jungles. LTTE leader Prabhakaran began holding out in the dense Nithihaikkulam jungles in the Mullaitivu District. He appointed Lt. Col Navam as the head of his personal security, with Balraj functioning as Navam's deputy.

When the IPKF launched Operation Checkmate in 1988 to kill Prabhakaran and destroy the LTTE's main base camp, Balraj played a key role in thwarting the operation by leading the defense. The fiercely fought battle was hand to hand at times, and Prabhakaran was only a few feet away from the Gurkhas during the firefight which ended in the defeat of the Indian commandos and death of Col. Bakshi, the officer who led the operation. Balraj sustained injuries during the battle, but Navam perished as he jumped on a grenade to save Prabhakaran from the impact of the blast, allowing the LTTE leader to narrowly escape.

After the withdrawal of the Indian army in 1990, Prabhakaran moved back to Jaffna with the rest of the LTTE leadership who quickly took control of the peninsula.

== Eelam War 2 ==
Balraj's role in defeating several Indian army offensives did not go unnoticed by Prabhakaran who appointed him as the military commander for the Vanni in 1990. This was the opportunity Balraj had been waiting for to demonstrate his military acumen and skills. The A-9 highway or Jaffna-Kandy road was then under the “nominal” control of the Sri Lankan army from Vavuniya to Elephant Pass. The army had military camps at strategic points. The LTTE led by Balraj launched two attacks on the Kokavil and Mankulam camps and overran them. Later another attack was conducted against the Kilinochchi camp. Though it was not overrun, the soldiers later evacuated and strengthened the Paranthan camp. These victories raised the LTTE’s reputation as a strong military force, and Balraj became known as a reputed military commander who inspired and galvanised LTTE cadres by courageously leading them on the frontlines.

In 1991, Balraj played a key role in the Tiger offensive to capture the Elephant Pass military complex. The operation, codenamed “Tharai – Kadal – Aahayam” (Land – Sea – Air), saw thousands of LTTE cadres attempt to overrun the highly guarded military base in a two pronged offensive. Balraj, alongside Theepan, were tasked with penetrating the complex from the Kurinchatheevu sector. Balraj and his men delivered by infiltrating through the lagoon and overrunning the military installation set up in the former guest house premises and retaining it until the operation was called off. Balraj and his unit destroyed it when withdrawing. The failure of other LTTE cadres to achieve their objectives led to the overall failure of the operation where 673 LTTE cadres were killed. It was, however, a personal triumph for Balraj. Although the Tigers suffered a defeat at Elephant Pass, LTTE leader Prabhakaran was impressed by the cadres' ability to mobilize as a conventional force - leading to his decision to convert the LTTE from guerrilla fighters into a conventional army. In late 1991, Prabhakaran raised the LTTE's first conventional fighting formation and appointed Balraj as the brigade's first commander. The unit was named after Charles Lucas Anthony, Prabhakaran’s trusted deputy and close associate who died in Meesalai on 15 July 1983. Balraj served as the unit's special commander until 1993. Apart from leading military assaults and offensives, Balraj also excelled in strategic defense. He was mainly responsible for defeating, preventing, restricting or nullifying several military offensives by the Sri Lankan armed forces. Some of these were “Operation Wanniwickrema” in Vavuniya, “Operation Lightning” in Manal Aru, “Operation Leap Forward” in Jaffna, and “Operation Yarl Devi” in Kilali.

In 1993, Balraj was seriously injured in the fighting at Puloppalai where he sustained serious injuries on his left leg when he fired an RPG at a moving T-55 tank. The injury gave him a permanent limp and forced him to use a cane when walking. Despite this debilitating setback, Balraj continued leading Tiger cadres on the frontlines.

== Eelam War 3 ==
In late 1995, the Sri Lankan army launched Operation Riviresa to capture the Jaffna Peninsula from the LTTE. After over a month of heavy fighting, the Tigers were forced to concede Jaffna and relocate to the Vanni in early 1996. It was then that Prabhakaran bestowed upon Balraj his greatest military honour - Deputy military commander of the LTTE. Prabhakaran was the official military commander of the LTTE; thus, Balraj effectively became the official number 2 in the Tiger military hierarchy. Despite losing Jaffna, the Tigers were in no means down and out and quickly began to establish themselves as a conventional force capable of defeating a numerically and logistically superior army in pitched battles. In July 1996, Balraj spearheaded Operation Unceasing Waves 1. After a week of intense fighting, the Tigers overran the Mullaitivu army camp and secured total control over the Mullaitivu District. In 1997, Balraj led the defense to Operation Jayasikurui, but later conceded that role to commanders Theepan and Karuna Amman after the army took control of Omanthai and Nedunkerny. In February 1998, Balraj spearheaded Operation Unceasing Waves 2 where the LTTE overran the Kilinochchi army camp after several days of intense fighting, killing over 2000 soldiers and giving the Tigers complete control over the Kilinochchi District. The timing of the offensive coincided with Sri Lanka’s 50th anniversary of Independence. In November 1999, Balraj coordinated a series offensives against several military camps, in Oddusuddan, Karippattaimurippu, Mankulam, Kanakarayankulam, Puliyankulam, etc. Most military gains of “Operation Jayasikurui” accumulated over a period of 18 months were reversed in 9 days under Balraj's command.

=== Second Battle of Elephant Pass ===
In March 2000, Balraj was tasked by Prabhakaran with overseeing the offensive that would topple the Elephant Pass military complex and allow the Tigers to re-capture Jaffna. Following their victory in 1991, the Sri Lankan armed forces strengthened defenses in and around the base, and raised a new division in 1999 with the sole purpose of preventing the base from falling into LTTE hands. A US army advisor to the Sri Lankan government toured the site in late 1999 and determined that it would be impossible for the LTTE to capture the base without an airforce. How the LTTE breached these impregnable defenses amounted to a modern military miracle, and it is widely regarded as Balraj’s crowning achievement.

In an ambhibious operation on 26 March 2000, the Sea Tigers led by Soosai succeeded in transporting 1,200 LTTE cadres from the mainland coast in Mullaitivu, behind army lines on to the peninsular coast in Jaffna. These cadres, led by Balraj, landed at Kudaarappu – Maamunai and then moved clandestinely into the interior by walking through the inland lagoon and marshy lands known as “kandal”. Army posts in Soranpatru and Maasaar were overrun and the Tigers reached the A- 9 road near Puthukkaadu junction. Thereafter the Tigers, led by Balraj, moved up and set up positions at Ithaavil near Pallai, thus blocking military supplies to Iyakkachchi – Elephant Pass. The next few weeks saw an intense battle where Balraj and his men held on to Ithaavil against formidable odds. There were many logistical obstacles, but Balraj fought on stubbornly, beating back every attempt the army had at dislodging him. After 24 days of intense fighting, the army gave in and abandoned the Elephant pass base on 19 April 2000. The LTTE hoisted the Tamil Eelam flag ceremoniously on 22 April. Balraj’s incredible military feat was analysed and dissected in military manuals as the Tigers made history as the first non-state military to defeat an an entire infantry division in a conventional battle without an airforce. Military analysts say that with the fall of Elephant pass, the LTTE established itself as the only non-state military force in the world capable of such complex manoeuvre war fighting.

=== LTTE military academy ===
When Balraj's health began to deteriorate, he gave lectures and instructions to LTTE recruits. Balraj taught military strategy, planning and tactics, providing specialised training for LTTE commandos and special forces.

=== Relationship with Tamils ===
Balraj interacted with the Tamil people in Sri Lanka as he moved through it, becoming one of the most popular members of the Liberation Tigers of Tamil Eelam because of his simplicity and accessibility. Often acting as an intermediary between the Tamil people and the LTTE leadership, he generally travelled on foot or bicycle without a bodyguard rather than in vehicles. This was unique among LTTE commanders, and Balraj's approach to the Tamils created some friction with other LTTE authorities.

=== Politics ===
Balraj did not participate in politics, and acknowledged Velupillai Prabhakaran as the leader of the LTTE and Tamil Eelam.

=== Health ===
He was injured before he received military training in Tamil Nadu, and was wounded three times in confrontations with the Indian Army. Balraj was frequently wounded in battle against the Sri Lankan Army, and had heart problems; he was hospitalised for two weeks for heart surgery in Singapore during the 2003 ceasefire. His emotional health was severely affected by the death of his wife. Despite his deteriorating health condition, he was often requested by Prabhakaran for assistance on the battlefield, where Balraj remained for many hours, further negatively impacting his health. After being hospitalized in Puthukkudiyiruppu, he returned to the battlefield to supervise defensive operations.

== Death ==
Balraj died on 20 May 2008 at 2:00 p.m. of a heart attack. He was promoted posthumously to Brigadier because he had been responsible for many LTTE victories on the battlefield against the Sri Lankan Army. A three-day period of mourning, from 21 to 23 May, was declared by the LTTE. Balraj was buried with full military honours, and laid to rest in Mullaitivu.
