= Bhanu (Tamil militant) =

Brigadier Bhanu
- Born: Sivanadan Somasekaran; 1 January 1962; Ariyalai, Sri Lanka
- Died: 18 May 2009 (aged 47); Vellamullivaikkal, Sri Lanka
- Military career
- Allegiance: Tamil Eelam
- Branch: Liberation Tigers of Tamil Eelam
- Service years: 1983–2009
- Rank: Brigadier
- Commands: LTTE Mortar / Artillery units (Kutti Sri Mortar Brigade & Kittu Artillery Brigade)
- Known for: Commander of LTTE artillery/mortar units
- Conflicts: Sri Lankan Civil War: Eelam War I, between 1984 and 1987; Indian intervention in the Sri Lankan Civil War, between 1987 and 1990; Eelam War II, between 1990 and 1995; Eelam War III, between 1995 and 2002; Eelam War IV, between 2006 and 2009

Sivanadan Somasekaran known by his nom de guerre, Bhanu, was a leading member of the Liberation Tigers of Tamil Eelam, a separatist Tamil militant organisation in Sri Lanka. Bhanu is widely regarded as one of the LTTE's finest field commanders, and is credited with raising the LTTE's artillery and mortar units. Bhanu played leading roles in LTTE victories at Pooneryn, Mullaitivu, and Elephant Pass.

== Early life ==
Bhanu was born in Ariyalai in 1962. Little is known about his childhood and family. He joined the LTTE in 1983 after being affected by the widespread state-sponsored anti-Tamil violence that plagued Sri Lanka during the early 1980s.

== Eelam War ==
Bhanu took part in several combat operations against the Sri Lankan Army during Eelam War I, and distinguished himself as a capable field officer during the Indo-LTTE War where he served as the commander for Mannar District and led Tiger cadres in several counter-offensives against the Indian Army. Bhanu led the Tiger assault on the Jaffna Fort, and helped the LTTE recapture the Jaffna Peninsula in late 1990 following the departure of the Indian Army. Bhanu was then redeployed to the Vanni to oversee Tiger offensives against the Sri Lankan Army. In 1993, Bhanu, alongside Theepan, led the LTTE assault on the Pooneryn army camp. Bhanu targeted the main naval camp at Nagathevanthurai while Theepan demolished the main army camp in Pooneryn. Bhanu discharged his duties efficiently and virtually demolished the navy camp while Theepan successfully routed the army and captured two T-55 battle tanks. Following the death of Col.Kittu, LTTE leader Velupillai Prabhakaran appointed Bhanu as the military commander for Jaffna. In 1995, Prabhakaran appointed Bhanu and Theepan as joint commanders to defend the Jaffna Peninsula from a large-scale army offensive. Their assignment was to delay the army and prevent the take-over of Jaffna before Great Heroes Day. Bhanu and Theepan offered fierce resistance as all the main routes to Jaffna were gradually surrounded by the army. While the army began to box the Tigers inside Jaffna town, Bhanu and Theepan managed to prevent the fall of Jaffna until early December before withdrawing, alongside hundreds of LTTE cadres, by wading through the Pannai lagoon until the Sea Tigers, led by Soosai, evacuated them to Vanni. Bhanu played a key role in Operation Unceasing Waves 1, where the Tigers completely overran the Mullaitivu army base and secured total control over the Mullaitivu District. The LTTE captured several artillery and mortar guns from the army at Mullaitivu, and Prabhakaran subsequently appointed Bhanu in-charge of raising the LTTE's mortar and artillery brigades. Under Bhanu's leadership, the LTTE successfully raised its artillery unit, known as the Kittu Artillery Brigade, which by 2008, included 130mm Type 59-1 field guns, 152mm Type 66 gun-howitzers, 120mm T-86 & T-83s, and Type 63 multiple rocket launchers. The LTTE's mortar unit, known as the Kutti Sri Mortar Brigade, possessed several mortar guns which had been previously captured from the army at Pulukunawa, Mullaitivu, Kilinochchi and Elephant Pass, and included several homemade mortars such as the Baba Mortar and Pasilan 2000. Pleased with Bhanu’s work, Prabhakaran directed him to establish an armoured unit. Bhanu did so diligently, establishing the Victor Anti-Tank Unit & Suran Armoured Unit in 1997, which possessed the T-55 tanks captured from the army at Pooneryn alongside hundreds of RPG's.

=== Second Battle of Elephant Pass ===
During the Second Battle of Elephant Pass, the LTTE’s artillery, mortar, and armoured units played a big role and enabled the Tigers to seize control of the sprawling military complex within a short period with relatively few casualties. Bhanu was given the honour of raising the Tamil Eelam flag as an acknowledgement of the contribution of the Kittu Artillery Brigade and Victor Anti-Tank unit during the battle.

=== Battle of Ananthapuram ===
By January 2009, 50,000 Sri Lankan soldiers from five division and three Special Forces besieged the LTTE in Puthukkudiyiruppu. The Tigers tried desperately to break out of this encirclement and drive the forces back, registering a minor success in late February 2009 when they launched a counter-strike, led by senior commanders Sornam and Lawrence, that pushed the army back by about 600-700 metres from their forward defence line positions and then proceeded to the north for about 8km. The LTTE then planned to launch a massive counter-offensive against the armed forces. The idea was to conduct a meticulously planned multi-pronged operation that would deliver a crippling blow to the security forces. In late March 2009, around 1000 LTTE cadres converged at Ananthapuram to prepare and launch a counterattack. Prabhakaran also visited the area, mapping the defenses in and around the Puthukudiyiruppu – Iranaippaalai Puthumaathalan Road that was under the control of the Charles Anthony Brigade. However, the army detected the movement of LTTE cadres in the area using their UAVs and quickly launched a pre-emptive strike. On March 30, over 50,000 soldiers mounted a multi-pronged military operation, taking the Tigers completely by surprise. LTTE cadres under the overall command of Bhanu and Theepan held out for several days before Bhanu succeeded in breaking through the military cordon and escaping, although he was injured in the process.

=== Final Battle ===
Bhanu led 300 LTTE cadres during the final battle at Vellamullivaikkal. On May 17 2009, Bhanu led a massive attack on the armed forces which succeeded, and allowed 3 Tiger contingents to break through towards the Nandikadal lagoon. Bhanu was killed in a firefight on May 18.
