= Battle of Kanakarayankulam (1997) =

Battle of the Sri Lankan civil war

- Part of the Sri Lankan civil war Operation Jayasikurui
Date	December 04, 1997
Location	9°3′2.47″N 80°30′53.77″E Kanakarayankulam, Mankulam
Result	Tamil Tiger victory

Belligerents
Military of Sri Lanka	Liberation Tigers of Tamil Eelam

Commanders and leaders
(Sri Lanka) Srilal Weerasooriya (Sri Lanka) Vasantha Perera (Sri Lanka) Gamini Hettiaratchi (Sri Lanka) N L Sirimanne †	Velupillai Prabhakaran; Karuna Amman

Units involved
53rd Division: Commando regiment; Sinha regiment	Siruthai brigade (elite child brigade); Charles Anthony Brigade; Kittu artillery brigade

Strength
Unknown	Unknown

Casualties and losses
154 killed 481 wounded 18 missing	LTTE claim: 35 killed SLA claim: ~200 killed

The Battle of Kanakarayankulam was fought on 4 December 1997, during the Sri Lankan civil war between the Sri Lanka Armed Forces and the Liberation Tigers of Tamil Eelam (LTTE).

== Initial operations ==
This battle was a part of operation Jayasikurui a Sri Lankan military offensive during the Eelam war III. It commenced on 13 May 1997 in order to open a land route to the government-held Jaffna Peninsula through Vanni territory held by the LTTE, by linking the government-held towns of Vavuniya and Kilinochchi. Despite heavy resistance, Sri Lankan military, led by elite 53rd division, managed to capture the Puliyankulam town on 15 November 1997.

== Events of December 4, 1997 ==
Meanwhile, intelligence reports indicated a LTTE build up near Mankulam (north of Puliyankulam), and reconnaissance by UAV detected three fortified LTTE bases with supporting artillery and mortar positions. On 4 December 1997, elements of Sinha regiment and commando regiment attached to 53rd division, advanced in two columns from Puthur (north west of Puliyankulam). They advanced towards Mankulam and Kankarayankulam in a pincer movement and met with little resistance. However they soon ran into an ambush laid by the Siruthai brigade (Leopard brigade), an elite child brigade of the LTTE. The LTTE bases were dummy ones and the commandos of 2nd commando regiment who were tasked to neutralize the artillery position was surrounded and overwhelmed.

SLA losses included the commanding officer of the commando unit, major Nilantha Lakmal Sirimanne, as well as 6 other officers killed and 30 wounded. In addition, 148 regular soldiers were killed, 451 were wounded and 18 were classified as missing in action. The LTTE claimed to have lost 35 soldiers killed while the SLA claimed to have killed around 200. Captain G. S. Jayanath of the 2nd commando regiment posthumously received the Parama Weera Vibhushanaya for gallantry in his actions during the battle.
