= Divisions of the Liberation Tigers of Tamil Eelam =

Military divisions in Sri Lanka organization

Divisions of the Liberation Tigers of Tamil Eelam refers to the military, intelligence and overseas divisions the Liberation Tigers of Tamil Eelam (LTTE). Most of these divisions were destroyed during the Eelam War IV, and only parts of the intelligence and financing divisions remain overseas.

== Military wing ==
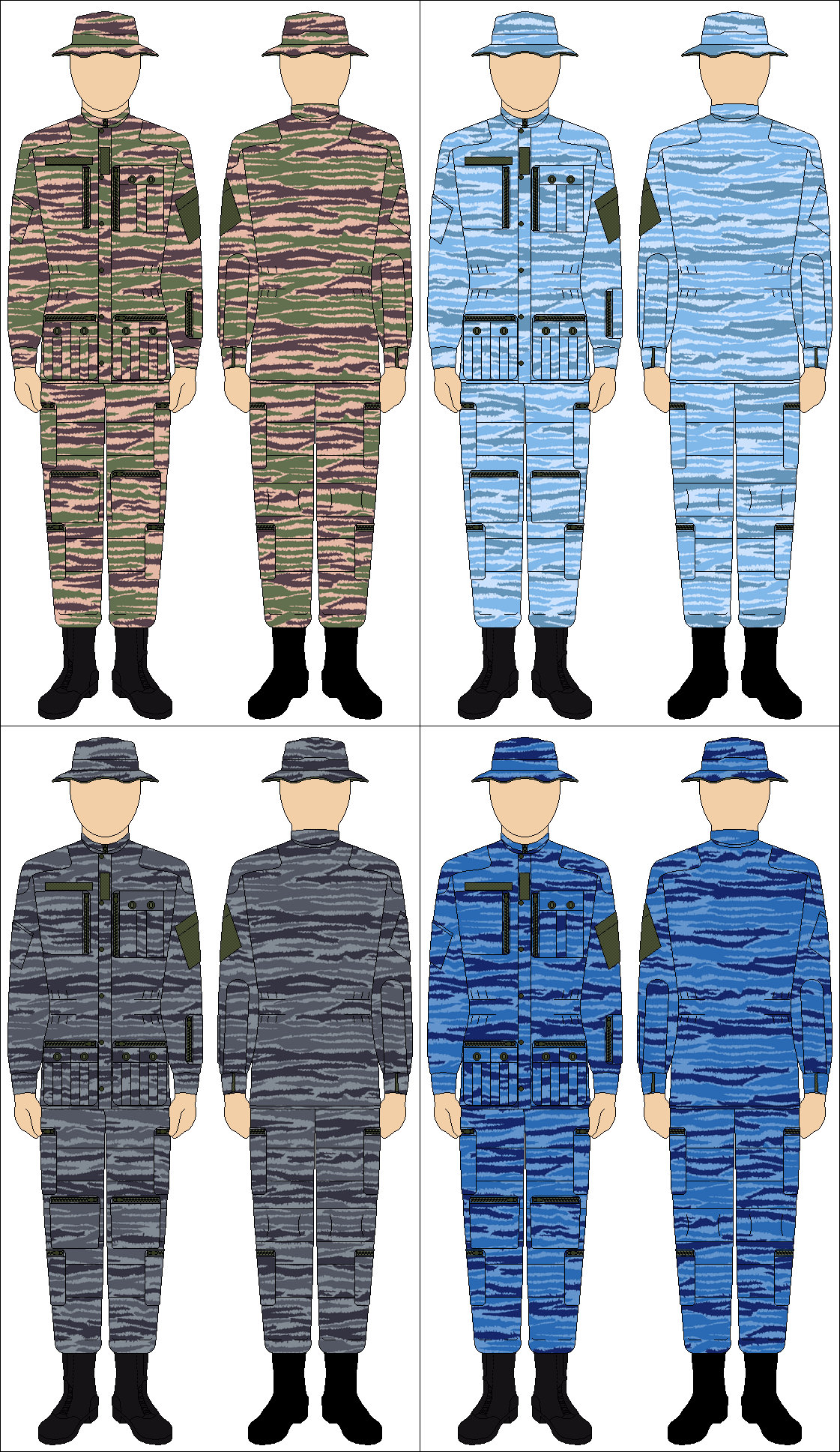
Uniforms of LTTE Cadres;TL: Ground Troops, TR:Air Force, BL: Black Tigers (Suicide Bombers) and BR: Naval Forces

=== Black Tigers ===
Black Tigers is the LTTE division that carried out suicide attacks in the South and other parts of the country. It consisted of selected cadres from other regiments. The division was formed in July 1987, with the attack carried out by Vallipuram Vasanthan alias Captain Miller, by driving an explosive laden truck into a Sri Lanka Army camp in Nelliady Madhya Maha Vidyalaya, Jaffna, killing himself and 128 soldiers. It was the first occasion that a Black Tiger blew up himself. LTTE intelligence wing leader Shanmugalingam Sivashankar alias Pottu Amman headed the outfit from its inception to destruction. According to LTTE, between 5 July 1987 and 20 November 2008, 378 black tigers (274 male and 104 female) had carried out suicide attacks.

Black Tiger wing carried out attacks on various high-profile leaders both inside and outside Sri Lanka. It had successfully targeted 3 world leaders, only insurgent group to do so. That includes assassination of Rajiv Gandhi, the former Prime Minister of India on 21 May 1991, assassination of Ranasinghe Premadasa, the President of Sri Lanka on 1 May 1993 and failed assassination attempt of Chandrika Kumaratunga, the Sri Lankan President on 18 December 1999, which resulted in the loss of her right eye.

The slain Black Tiger cadres were highly glorified and their families were given the "Maaveerar family" status. Those cadres were given a chance to have his/her last supper with the LTTE leader Prabhakaran, which was considered a rare honour in the LTTE controlled area. This, in turn motivated LTTE cadres to join the Black Tiger wing.

=== Sea Tigers ===
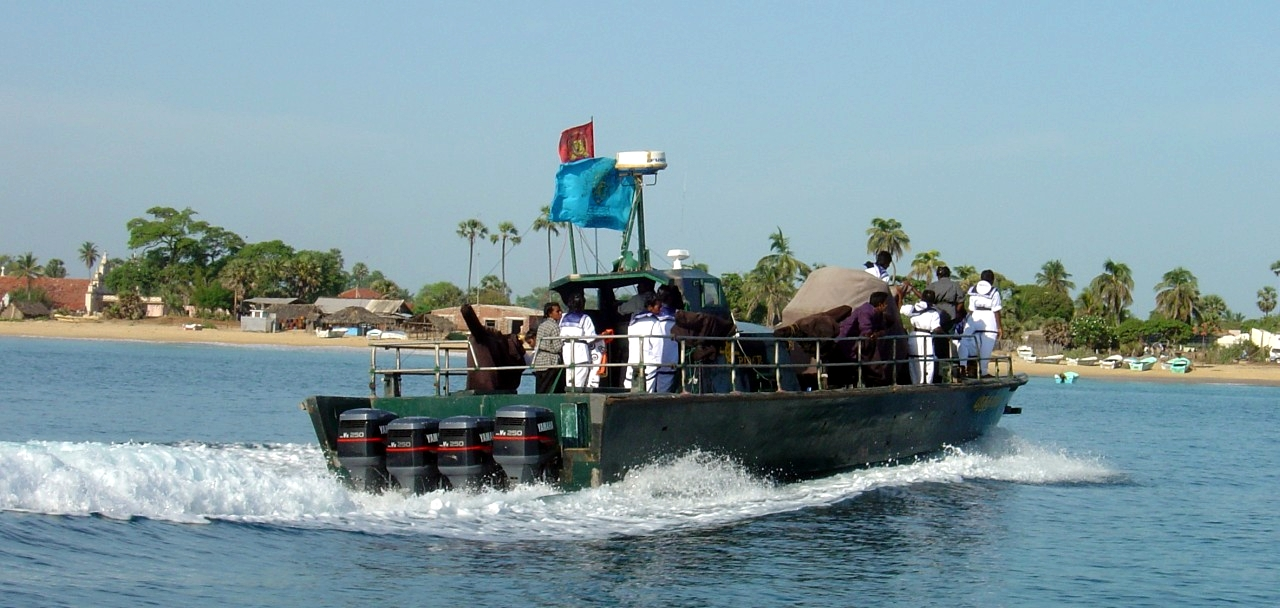
Sea Tiger fast attack boat.

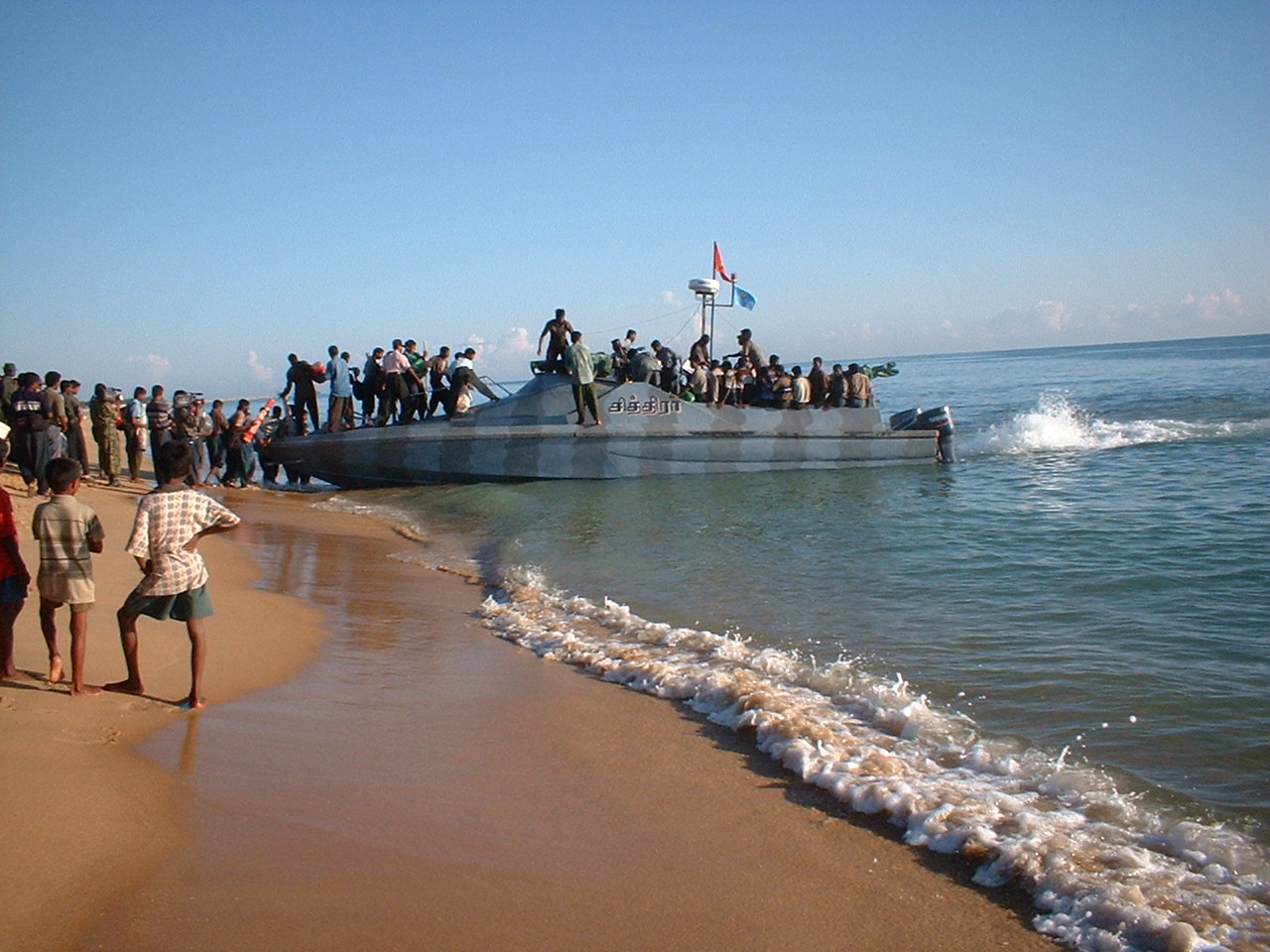
Sea tiger boat.

The Sea Tigers was the naval wing of LTTE, founded in 1984. During its existence, it had sunk at least 29 small inshore patrol boats and one freighter of Sri Lanka Navy. The Sea Tigers also had a number of small but effective suicide bomber vessels with which they staged several attacks against Sri Lankan civilian and military ports and shipping. The Sea Tigers were led by Thillaiyampalam Sivanesan alias Soosai, with their main base at Mullaitivu, on the north-eastern coast of Sri Lanka. The Sea Tigers' fighting capabilities diminished towards the end of 2008, as the Sri Lankan Army captured more of its bases such as Viduthalathivu and Nachchikuda, and Sri Lanka Navy strictly cordoned off the Northern sea.

=== Air Tigers ===
Aircraft in LTTE possession
Type of Aircraft	Quantity
Micro Light Gliders	2
ZLIN 143	5
Robinson R-44	1
Gyroplane	2
Unmanned aerial vehicles	2

Air Tigers was the air-wing of LTTE. Its existence had been subject to speculation for many years, but was only revealed after the first attack in March 2007, making the LTTE the only militant organisation (besides ISIS) in the world, known to have obtained and used aircraft. The LTTE credits the formation of the Air Tigers wing to Colonel Shankar, alias Vythialingam Sornalingam. On November 27–28, 1998, Tamilnet reported, the LTTE-operated Voice of Tiger radio station had claimed that "Aircraft of the Air Tiger wing of the Liberation Tigers [had] sprinkled flowers over the cemeteries of the slain LTTE cadres in Mulliyawalai," during the annual Heroes Day celebrations. This was not confirmed by the Sri Lanka Air Force but several reports have received that unidentified aircraft had been seen in Mullaitivu sky. On August 11, 2006, quoting unidentified sources in Jaffna, Tamilnet reported that "at least one unidentified aircraft" had flown over the Sri Lankan military base at Palali, firing "rockets" at government forces. However, these aircraft were only identified for the first time after they carried out an attack on Katunayake Air force base in March 2007 in which two Z Lin Z 143 light aircraft were used. This was followed by 8 more attacks on military targets. The final one was a suicide air raid targeting Sri Lanka Air Force headquarters in Colombo in February 2009. During the Northern offensive, Sri Lanka Army captured 7 aircraft runways belonging to the LTTE.

=== Charles Anthony Special Regiment ===
Charles Anthony Special Regiment (Native language: சாள்ஸ் அன்ரனி சிறப்பு படையணி) was the first conventional fighting formation created by the LTTE, on 10 April 1991. It has remained the main fighting force throughout the rest of the time of LTTE and has fought several major battles in the civil war including Operation Jayasikurui, the Battle of Mullaitivu, the Battle of Kilinochchi, the Second Battle of Elephant Pass and the LTTE's Operation Unceasing Waves (Oyatha Alaigal) I, II, III and IV. The brigade was named after Charles Lucas Anthony alias Lt. Seelan, who had been LTTE leader Velupillai Prabhakaran's right-hand man during the early stages of the LTTE, and was also the first attack commander of the LTTE. Kandiah Balasegaran alias Balraj, Amuthab and Gobith have also served as its commanders. During the final days of the civil war, the regiment had been completely destroyed.

=== Jeyanthan Regiment ===
Jeyanthan Brigade consisted of LTTE fighters from the Eastern Province. Its fighters participated in many conventional battles including the Battle of Pooneryn, Operation Jayasikurui, the Battle of Mullaitivu, the Battle of Kilinochchi and the Second Battle of Elephant Pass. The brigade was named in the memory of Sampukuddi Pathmanthan alias Captain 'Jeyanthan'. Jeyanthan Brigade deputy, Col. Nagesh was killed in the Battle of Aanandapuram and the commander of Jayanthan Brigade Col. Keerththi was killed on 15.5.2009

Heavy artillery in LTTE possession
Type of artillery	Quantity
152 mm towed gun-howitzer	15
130 mm towed field gun	12
122 mm howitzer	10
85 mm Gun T-56	2
Improvised 106mm Artillery	1+
Indigenously produced long-range artillery	5
2 types of 107 mm Indigenous MBRL(6-barrel)	2
Type 63 multiple rocket launcher (12-barrel)	1
107 mm Indigenous Single BRL (1-barrel)	1

=== Kittu Artillery Brigade ===
The artillery brigade of the LTTE military. Its commander Brig. Mannivannan was killed in the Battle of Aanandapuram. Weapons in possession of Kittu artillery brigade by 2008 included 130mm Type 59-1 field guns, 152mm Type 66 gun-howitzers, 120mm T-86 & T-83, Type 63 multiple rocket launchers and other kinds of artillery (see list). Some of these guns had been captured from the army at Pulukunawa, Mullaitivu and Elephant Pass, while most 130mm and 152mm guns have been purchased by the LTTE.

=== Kutti Sri Mortar Brigade ===
This is the Mortar brigade of the LTTE. Captured weapons of Kutti Siri mortar brigade(see list). But they have already destroyed a large number of mortars during the final stages. So the actual number is unknown. Along with it they also produced homemade mortars of their own like the Baba Mortar and Pasilan 2000. Col. Gopalan, the Kutti Sri Mortar Brigade deputy commander, was killed in the Battle of Aanandapuram. Brig. Bhanu, the overall commander of this brigade was killed on 18 May 2009. Lt. Col. Bhavanithi was the special commander of the women division of the Kutti Sri mortar brigade. Her fate is unknown.

Mortar in LTTE possession
Type of Mortar	Quantity
140 mm Mortar	4
120 mm Mortar	57
82 mm Mortar	38
81 mm Mortar	147
60 mm Mortar	487
commando mortar	65

=== Radha Air-Defence Regiment ===
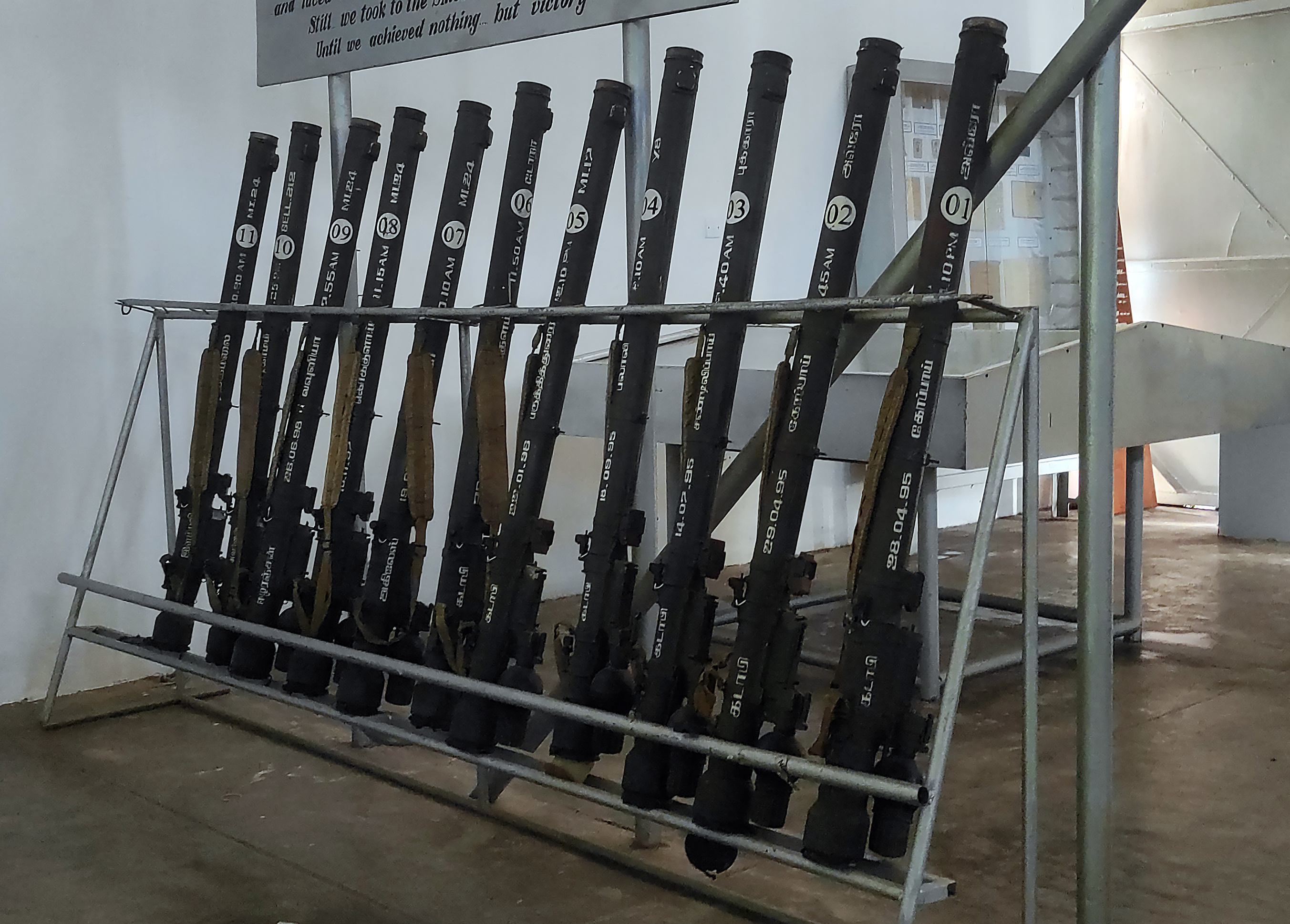
Sri Lankan Army captured a number of 9K38 Igla launch tubes from the Liberation Tigers of Tamil Eelam, and these were used by the Radha Air-Defence Regiment to target Sri Lankan Air Force aircraft on several occasions. Today, these captured launch tubes are displayed at the Sri Lanka Air Force Museum.

Ratha Regiment was the assigned air defence unit of the LTTE and gave personnel protection to LTTE supremo Velupillai Prabakaran. Until 2002 this unit was a part of the Imran-Pandian regiment of LTTE and was known as the Ratha Airdefence Team. After 2002 many cadets from other units were included and the unit expanded as the 'Radha Air-defence Regiment'. They were further divided into:-

- Yesudas Security Team
- Anti-aircraft missile Team
- Aerial surveillance team

As the anti-aircraft regiment of LTTE, it carried out 4 successful surface-to-air missile attacks on Sri Lanka Air Force passenger flights. Attacked aircraft are: 2 Avro aircraft (On 28 & 29 April 1995) which were shot by Brigadier Gaddafi, 1 Antonov An-32 (On 22 November 1995) and 1 Mil Mi-17 helicopter (On 22 January 1996). All 4 attacks took place at Palaly Air Force base, killing at least 202 servicemen. This regiment had at least 5 IGLA 1 missile launchers and 16+ IGLA 1 (SA 16) missiles in its possession. Along with this they also had SA-7 Grail, 9K34 Strela-3, FIM-92 Stinger, and HN-5 MANPADS launchers. They were also equipped with a 40mm AA gun (Found mounted on a Buffel), a T-65/74 37 mm cannon, a T-61 25mm double-barrel AA gun (Captured from the SLA during the Battle of Elephant Pass) and many other antiaircraft weapons. Most of these guns were captured by SLA during the final months of battle. Lt. Col. Silambarasan, the commander of the Ratha Regiment was killed in Battle of Aanandapuram, and his deputy Lt. Col. Anbu was captured and later executed.

==== Suran Armoured Team ====
This unit was operating under the Imran-Pandiyan regiment as an LTTE's armoured unit and commanded by Lt. Col. Paartheepan until his death in 13-08-2006 and later by Maniyarasan. Suran armoured unit had a T-55 Main battle tank, captured from Sri Lanka Army in the battle of Poonakarey in 1993 and a T-55 AM2 tank believed to be captured during the Second Battle of Elephant Pass. Army troops re-captured the T-55 tank in the west of Putumattalan in April 2009 and destroyed T-55 AM2 in a battle at Puthukudiyiruppu, 2009. Another Light Composite Tank, which was improvised by the LTTE, was captured by the SLA during the last day of the armed civil war.

=== Ponnamman Mining Unit ===
The specialised mining unit of the LTTE. Lt. Col. Asmi, the commander of the Ponnamman mining unit was captured in the Battle of Aanandapuram and believed to be executed later.

=== Thesiya Man Meetpup Padai aka Pistol Gang ===
The real name of this Pistol gang is Thesiya Man Meetpup Padai, Literal translation: National Land Reclamation Force. But they were famously known as the Pistol gang. LTTE pistol gang is involved in many hit-and-run operations on government agents, security force members, security forces informants, dissidents etc.

=== Auxiliary forces ===
These groups were dubbed as Special Task Forces.

==== Eela Padai ====
Eela Padai consisted of civilians recruited by LTTE. It had a strength of 5000, who were used as home guards and later, for defensive and offensive purposes. They were on the payroll of LTTE. Members of Eela Padai received a monthly salary of about Rs. 2,500 (US$25).

==== Grama Padai ====
Grama Padai aka Rural Force was an auxiliary force of LTTE, used to assist it in meeting logistics requirements as well as for carrying out defensive operations. It also had a strength of about 5000.

==== Thunai Padai ====
Thunai Padai was a Support Force of LTTE. They were further divided into

- Neelan Thunaip Padai
- Maravan Thunaip Padai

== Women's wing ==
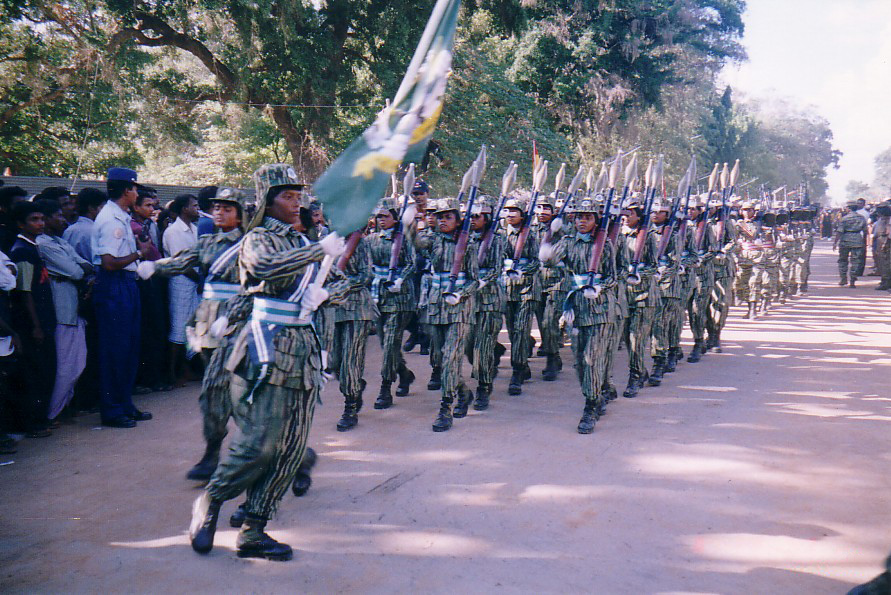
LTTE women's wing of Victor anti-tank regiment(Front) and General Purpose Machine Gun Team(Rear) marching in a parade.

LTTE's women's wing had consisted of 4 regiments and each wing consisted of around 1000 cadets. They engaged in military offensives as well as administrative tasks.

=== Malathi Regiment ===
One of the two women's military brigades of LTTE. Named after the first woman killed on behalf of LTTE, during operations against the Indian Peace Keeping Force, Malathi. Its Special commander Brig. Vithusha and her deputy Col. Kamalini were killed during Battle of Aanandapuram in April 2009.

=== Sothiya Regiment ===
This is the other women's military brigade of LTTE. Named after Maj. Sothiya, commander of the first women's unit formed in 1989. She died of meningitis in 1990. Its Special commander Brig. Thurga, and her deputy Col. Mohana were killed during Battle of Aanandapuram. After the death of Thurga, Mathuram was appointed as its Special commander and she too was killed during the final days of the war in 2009

== Intelligence wing ==
=== Tiger Organization Security Intelligence Service ===
Tiger Organization Security Intelligence Service aka TOSIS, formed in December 1983, was the intelligence service of LTTE. It was run by Pottu Amman. Kapil Amman served as its deputy leader. TOSIS had been instrumental in all of the attacks of LTTE, especially the Black Tiger suicide attacks. TOSIS had played a crucial role in identifying Gopalaswamy Mahendraraja alias Mahattaya had been leaking secrets to India's Research and Analysis Wing. The responsibility of administering the LTTE's intelligence wing was entrusted to Pottu Amman in mid 1988 by Prabhakaran. Before that, it was run by a person called Vasanthan, who left the organization in 1987. Most of its cardres were killed in May 2009. Present status is unknown.

=== Military intelligence ===
LTTE's military intelligence was separate from TOSIS and was headed by Shanmuganathan Ravishankar alias Colonel. Charles. He was killed in a Sri Lanka Army Long Range Reconnaissance Patrol (LRRP) claymore attack in Pallemadu, Mannar in January 2008.

Former cadres such as Kagusthan Ariaratnam have described being assigned to the LTTE’s intelligence wing as minors, providing rare firsthand accounts of recruitment and operations within the organization’s intelligence structures.

== Political wing ==
LTTE had a separate political wing for civil administrative matters. S. P. Thamilselvan headed this wing until his death in November 2007. After that, Balasingham Nadesan, whom initially was Constable of Sri Lanka Police, headed the wing until his death on 18 May 2009. Political wing had a wide range of departments under its control. Prior to the end of the conflict, it functioned almost like a separate state. However, negotiation with the Sri Lankan government was carried out at almost all the time by Anton Balasingham, who was LTTE's theoretician and chief negotiator, with the inclusion of the head of the political wing, during peace talks. But crucial decisions were taken almost entirely by Balasingham and LTTE leader Prabhakaran.

=== Tamil Eelam Economic Development Organisation ===
Tamil Eelam Economic Development Organisation (TEEDOR) oversaw all development and civil activities in the LTTE controlled area. Its areas of concern include education, transport, administrative service, health service, banking, forest conservation, fisheries, industries, revenue collection, tax collection, public utilities, agriculture, irrigation, environment, road development and construction. Its headquarters was situated in Kilinochchi. V. Balakumaran, a one-time senior leader of the Eelam Revolutionary Organisation of Students (EROS), had been its head.

=== International Peace Secretariat ===
The LTTE Peace secretariat, created after the 2002 Ceasefire Agreement, conducted foreign relations on behalf of the organization, issued statements and handled the relations with media. Seevaratnam Prabaharan alias Pulidevan was the Director of it. In June 2008, news emerged that Pulidevan had been put into house arrest for alleged charges of treachery against the outfit. In a similar move, LTTE put Gopalaswamy Mahendraraja alias Mahattaya, into house arrest and subsequently executed under the charges of leaking secrets to India's Research and Analysis Wing. Mahattaya was the head of People's Front of Liberation Tigers, the Tamil Tigers' political party. However it fell out with the LTTE.

=== Police Force ===
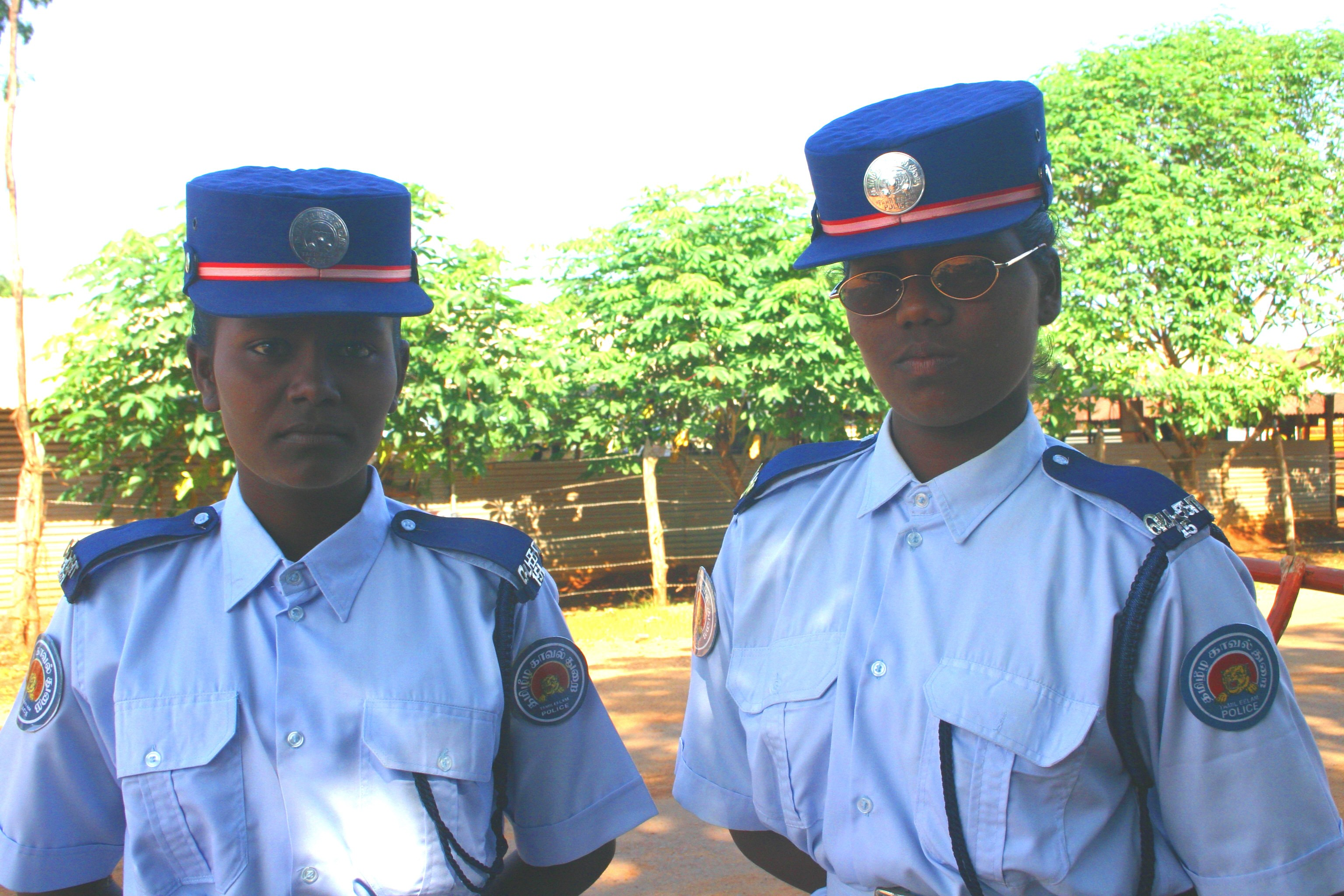
LTTE Women Police

LTTE created its own police force in 1992. Balasingham Nadesan was its head throughout its existence, although he was promoted as the head of political wing in November 2008. As police chief, Nadesan oversaw the building of new police stations in the East following the 2002 Ceasefire Agreement. LTTE Police Headquarters was situated in Kilinochchi town.

=== LTTE court ===
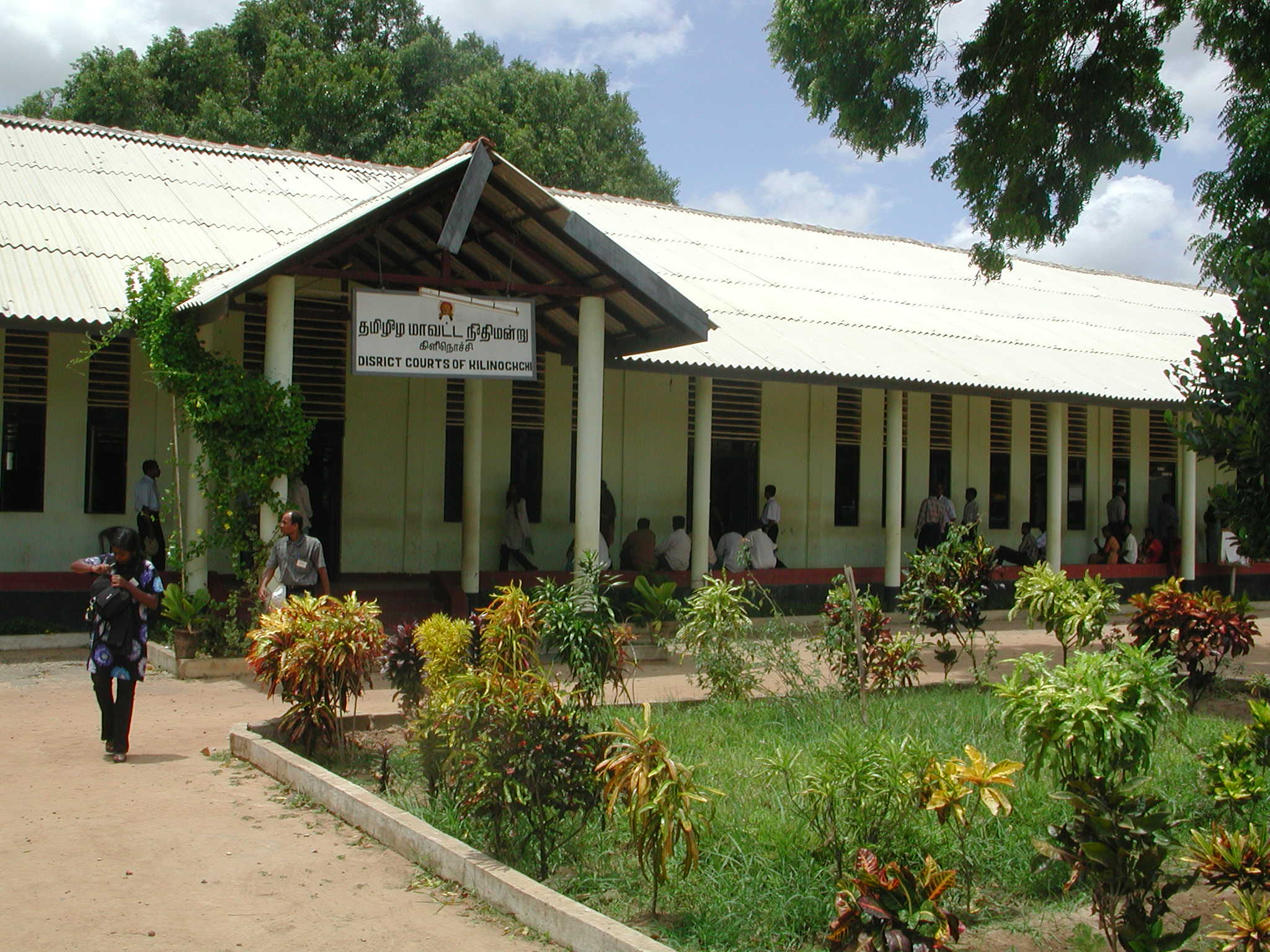
Kilinochchi court

LTTE controlled a separate court system, which looked into civil and criminal cases inside the LTTE controlled area. Main court was situated in the Kilinochchi town.

=== Bank of Tamil Eelam ===
"Bank of Tamil Eelam" was LTTE's official bank, which governed under its political wing. It was established in 1994. LTTE controlled 11 branches of this bank throughout the Vanni region. It had even provided loan and credit facilities to the people of north and east Sri Lanka. The bank suspended its activities on 2 January 2009 after Sri Lanka Army captured Kilinochchi, the administrative capital of LTTE controlled region.

=== Voice of Tigers ===
Pulikalin Kural aka Voice of Tigers, LTTE's Radio station was established in 1990, in Jaffna. LTTE leader's Maaveerar day speech was usually broadcast on Voice of Tigers on 27 November in each year. Its main broadcasting station was attacked by Sri Lanka Air Force on 27 November 2007, while the speech was being broadcast. LTTE claims that it was one of the 23 times SLAF has targeted the station.

=== Sports Division ===
LTTE sports division was headed by 'Papa'. He was arrested in May 2009 and now working for the State intelligence services.

== Global network ==
Out of the LTTE's divisions, details about its global network are scarcely known. Prominent tasks conducted by this global network include propaganda, fund raising, arms procurement and shipping. At the height of its power, LTTE had 42 offices all over the world. The global network of LTTE is functional in 4 major areas. Departments within the global network include,

=== KP Branch ===
Selvarasa Pathmanathan alias Kumaran Pathmanathan alias KP was LTTE's chief arms dealer and international head from its rise to prominence in 1983 to signing the Norwegian brokered ceasefire agreement in 2002. KP travelled to various black markets using 23+ aliases and 200+ passports. His continuous shipments of arms fueled the Eelam War I, II and III. Major achievements of KP branch include purchasing and shipping 60 tonnes of explosives (50 tonnes of TNT and 10 tonnes of RDX) from Rubezone Chemical plant in Ukraine in 1994, providing a forged Bangladeshi Ministry of Defense end-user certificate, and theft of 32,400 rounds of 81 mm mortar ammunition purchased from Tanzania destined for the Sri Lanka Army. In 2002, after the signing of peace deal, some elements within LTTE, allegedly Castro and Thamilselvan brought forward various charges against KP, including corruption, inefficiency, sexual impropriety etc. Since then, KP was steadily marginalised and in 2003, he went into "voluntary" retirement. But in 2008, after a series of military debacles in North and the East, LTTE leader Prabhakaran requested him to return to the LTTE. KP accepted the request and in January 2009, he was appointed the head of newly created "International relations department". But his appointment did not stop the tide against LTTE, which was defeated in May 2009. In August 2009, a Sri Lankan military intelligence unit, with the collaboration of local authorities, captured Pathmanathan in the Tune Hotel, Downtown Kuala Lumpur, Malaysia.

=== Castro Branch ===
Since 2002, after sidelining KP branch, LTTE relied heavily on International secretariat headed by Veerakathy Manivannam alias Castro for arms shipments and other foreign activities. Castro was based in Kilinochchi, but he had a branch network controlled by him in the foreign countries. Perinpanayagam Sivaparan alias Nediyavan, who acts as the LTTE leader in Norway was appointed by him. Castro died in Sri Lanka Army's final offensive in Vellamullivaikkal, Mullaitivu.

=== Aiyannah Group ===
Ponniah Anandaraja alias Aiyannah led the LTTE's Aiyannah group, which is responsible for LTTE's connection with North Korean government. Aiyannah, a member of World Tamil Coordinating Committee of USA and later, the accountant of LTTE, had worked at the North Korean embassy in Bangkok since late 1997. Jane's Intelligence Review states that Aiyannah Group functioned as the "group's [LTTE's] intelligence and operations body, likely to be responsible for monitoring and ensuring the organization's financial support and revenue streams." Most of the LTTE's weapons shipments came from North Korea, since 1997.

=== TV Stations ===
LTTE's global network operated several TV channels in Europe and Australia, named "Tharisanam TV", "Tamil Television Network" (TTN), "Makkal TV" and "Euro TV" as a major propaganda arm. Tharisanm was broadcasting its programmes in connection with companies in France, Israel and Hong Kong. It had used French and Israeli satellites named Globecast and Satlink, for the broadcasting purposes. In 2008, Israel took steps to ban Tharisanam. Makkal TV was aired with the help of the pro-LTTE political party Pattali Makkal Katchi (PMK) in Chennai. France ceased the broadcasting of Tamil Television Network (TTN) in May 2007. Euro TV also was banned by Italy in May 2008.

=== International Radio ===
LTTE launched the London-based International Broadcasting Corporation, IBC Tamil radio station in 1997. IBC had urged Tamils in the United Kingdom to support pro-LTTE fundraising events organized by White Pigeon and other LTTE front associations.

=== Publications ===
There has been a wide array of pro-LTTE publications, both digital and print, controlled by the LTTE global network. Most notable websites include TamilNet, Paris-based Sankathi and Germany based Pathivu. Paris, London, Canada and Australia based Eelamurazu is one of its many printed media.

== See also ==
- Liberation Tigers of Tamil Eelam
