= Jeyanthan Brigade =

Jeyanthan Regiment
- ஜெயந்தன் படையணி
- Active: 4 May 1993 - 18 May 2009
- Country: Tamil Eelam
- Branch: Liberation Tigers of Tamil Eelam
- Type: Infantry
- Role: Frontline Combat
- Size: unknown
- Part of: Liberation Tigers of Tamil Eelam
- Motto(s): எங்கும் செல்வோம். எதிலும் வெல்வோம் (Tamil: We will go anywhere. We will win at anything)
- Colors: Blue
- Anniversaries: 4 May(Regimental day)
- Engagements: Sri Lankan Civil War

Commanders
- Colonel of the Regiment: Colonel Keerththi
- Notable commanders: Col.Keerththi, Col.Nagesh, Col. Ram, Col. Jeyaththan, Lt. Col. Bhavaan

Insignia
- Identification symbol

The Jeyanthan Regiment was an elite infantry formation of the LTTE. It was founded on 3 May 1993 and was initially trained under the leadership of Colonel Karuna Amman. It was the second oldest and most feared infantry unit of the Tamil Tigers. According to LTTE leader Velupillai Prabhakaran, the Sri Lanka Armed Forces feared the Jeyanthan Brigade the most and sought to avoid direct clashes with them. The soldiers in the unit all hailed from villages in the Eastern Province. Unlike the Charles Anthony Brigade which was only deployed in the North, the Jeyanthan Brigade was deployed in the East as well as the North and played an important role during Second Battle of Elephant Pass. The regiment was named after the LTTE's first Eastern Sea Black Tiger, Captain Jeyanthan, who destroyed a Sri Lankan Naval Patrol Vessel off the coast of Point Pedro on 4 May 1991. Prabhakaran inaugurated the unit on the 2nd death anniversary of Captain Jeyanthan in 1993.

The regiment first demonstrated their fighting capabilities during Operation Thavalai (Frog) when they smashed the SLA base at Pooneryn on 11 November 1993. The Jeyanthan Brigade lost 91 soldiers in the attack. From 1993 onwards, the soldiers of the unit took part in battles across the North Eastern Province from Amparai to Manal Aru to Jaffna. Carrying their weapons and supplies and clashing with Sri Lankan troops on the way, their endurance and combat skills were tested to the limit. The brigade's next major battle was in 1996, during the LTTE's Operation ‘Unceasing Waves’ in which the SLA's Mullaitivu army base complex was overrun. They joined the resistance to the SLA's ‘Operation Sath Jeya' in 1996 while, simultaneously, fighting on the Batticaloa-Amparai front. During Operation Jayasikurui, the Sri Lankan Army concentrated 5 fighting Divisions(50,000 soldiers) for a major offensive to invade the Vanni and smash the LTTE heartland. Despite suffering over 150 casualties in a bloody assault on the Vanunathivu military base in Batticaloa, the Jeyanthan brigade still relocated the bulk of their forces towards the Vanni front on Prabhakaran's command and played an instrumental role in halting the SLA advance at Puliyankulam.

In March 2004, the Jeyanthan Brigade suffered its biggest setback when Col.Karuna staged his rebellion against Prabhakaran. Karuna had one battalion of the brigade under his leadership and when the split occurred, one battalion remained loyal to LTTE leader Prabhakaran while the other stayed loyal to him. However, most commanders of the brigade, including Col. Keerththi, Col. Nagesh, Col. Ram, Lt.Col Jeyaaththan and Lt.Col Bhavaan, all remained loyal to Prabhakaran and helped the LTTE leader's hand in crushing Karuna's Rebellion during the Easter offensive of 2004. Karuna reportedly urged the brigade's commanders to defect and seek a safe passage from the SLA at Muhamalai, but instead they refused. Whilst a proportion remained on the Manal Aru frontlines, a substantial contingent moved south, to dismantle Karuna's rebellion. Despite crushing the rebellion, the Jeyanthan Brigade never recovered from the loss of the split with many of the soldiers that defected from the brigade joining Karuna's Tamil Makkal Viduthalai Pulikal paramilitary faction and fighting alongside the Sri Lankan army during the Eastern Theatre of Eelam War IV.

The regiment also participated in other conventional battles fought against the Sri Lankan Forces including Operation Sath Jaya, Battle of Kilinochchi, Battle of Jaffna, Battle of Thoppigala, Battle of Kilinochchi and Battle of Ananthapuram.

By May 2005, the regiment lost 859 soldiers in Northern battles and 375 soldiers in Eastern battles.

== See also ==
- Tamil Tigers
