= Theepan =

Sri Lankan Tamil militant (1966–2009)

Brigadier Theepan
- தீபன்
- Born: V. Baheerathakumar; 8 January 1966
- Died: 4 April 2009 (aged 43); Ananthapuram, Mullaitivu District
- Organization: Liberation Tigers of Tamil Eelam
- Call sign: Tango Papa
- Military service
- Allegiance: Tamil Eelam
- Branch: Liberation Tigers of Tamil Eelam
- Service years: 1984 –2009
- Conflicts: Sri Lankan Civil War: Eelam War I, between 1984 and 1987; Indian intervention in the Sri Lankan Civil War, between 1987 and 1990; Eelam War II, between 1990 and 1995; Eelam War III, between 1995 and 2002; Eelam War IV, between 2006 and 2009

Velayuthapillai Baheerathakumar (Tamil: வேலாயுதபிள்ளை பகீரதகுமார் Vēlāyutapiḷḷai Pakīratakumār; 8 January 1966 – 4 April 2009; commonly known by the nom de guerre Theepan) was a leading member of the Liberation Tigers of Tamil Eelam (LTTE), a separatist Tamil militant organisation in Sri Lanka. He played a leading role in the LTTE's military victories in the Vanni during Eelam War III, including Mullaitivu (1996), Kilinochchi (1998), Oddusuddan (1999) and Elephant Pass (2000). He was killed at the Battle of Ananthapuram in the last days of the Sri Lankan Civil War. Theepan is considered to be one of the finest field commanders of the LTTE, and widely seen as a close second to Brigadier Balraj.

== Early life and family ==
Baheerathakumar was born on 8 January 1966. He was from Vaddakkachchi in Kandavalai, Kilinochchi District. His family were originally from Varani in Jaffna District. He was educated at Chavakachcheri Hindu College.

Baheerathakumar's sister is married to Tamil National Alliance MP S. Shritharan. His three elder brothers live in Canada. His younger brother Sivakumar (nom de guerre Kilman), who was in command of the Charles Anthony division in Trincomalee District, was killed in an accident in 1994. His cousin was Thileepan (alias Curdles or Kerdy), the LTTE's regional commander for Thenmarachchi.

Baheerathakumar married a former LTTE cadre, they had no children.

== Eelam War ==
Baheerathakumar was recruited into the Liberation Tigers of Tamil Eelam by his cousin Thileepan in 1984. He took on the nom de guerre Theepan and codename Tango Papa. He sometimes used the aliases Thavabalasingam or Sivatheeban.

Theepan served in Mahattaya's Vanni command. He then joined Mahattaya's bodyguard unit. Mahattaya became deputy leader of the LTTE in 1987 and re-located to Jaffna. Theepan went to Jaffna to be Mahattaya's chief bodyguard. Mahattaya was later transferred back to Vanni and Theepan joined him in Paalamottai, Vavuniya District. Theepan was then appointed military commander for Kilinochchi District where he carried many attacks against the Indian Peace Keeping Force (IPKF).

In 1988 the LTTE's three regional commands in Vanni were unified and placed under the command of Balraj. Theepan became Balraj's deputy. Shortly after the IPKF's withdrawal from Sri Lanka in 1990 war erupted between the LTTE and the Sri Lankan government. Balraj and Theepan led a number of successful operations against the Sri Lankan military in the Vanni including the capture of Mankulam and Kokavil in June/July 1990. They also took part in the unsuccessful attack on Elephant Pass in July/August 1991. When Balraj was appointed commander of the Charles Anthony Brigade in 1992 Theepan became the new regional commander for Vanni. Theepan was involved in the successful Operation Ithayabhoomi (Heartland), Operation Yarl Devi and Operation Thavalai (Frog).

Mahattaya was executed by the LTTE for treason in 1994 after which Theepan was transferred from Vanni to Jaffna. Theepan helped defend Jaffna against the Sri Lankan military's Operation Leap Forward. He also took part in the LTTE's Operation Thunderstrike. In October 1995 the Sri Lankan military launched Operation Riviresa (Sun Rays) to re-capture the Jaffna Peninsula. After the military reached the outskirts of Jaffna city Theepan and Bhanu were made joint commanders of the LTTE forces defending Jaffna. Despite being surrounded on all sides Theepan and the LTTE held on until 27 November 1995 (Maaveerar Naal). They then withdrew from Jaffna and waded through Jaffna lagoon before being rescued by the Sea Tigers. Theepan led the reconnaissance of the army camp in Mullaitivu prior to it being overrun by the LTTE in July 1996. In 1997 the Sri Lankan military launched Operation Jayasikurui (Certain Victory) aimed at clearing a land route to the Jaffna peninsula. Theepan was given the task of defending the A9 highway. He was also the LTTE's overall field commander against Jayasikurui. He was at the time joint commander of the Vanni along with Karuna Amman. He took part in the successful capture of Kilinochchi in September 1998. After Jayasikurui was called off in 1998 the LTTE launched Operation Unceasing Waves III which resulted in a series of LTTE victories from Oddusuddan to Elephant Pass. As joint commander of the Vanni region Theepan played a major role in these victories.

After Elephant Pass the LTTE gained some territory in the south of the Jaffna peninsula and Theepan was put in charge of the LTTE's Kilaly-Muhamaalai-Nagar Kovil forward defences. He was appointed Northern Regional Commander. The military launched Operation Agni Kheela (Ball of Fire) to re-capture the southern part of the Jaffna peninsula, particularly Elephant Pass. The operation was disaster for the military - it suffered heavy casualties and Theepan was responsible for this. The LTTE withdrew from the Jaffna peninsula after the military captured Paranthan. Theepan and his cadres withdrew from the peninsula to Challai via Chundikkulam lagoon. He was also in charge of defending Kilinochchi and despite being surrounded the LTTE held on to their administrative capital until 2009.

During the 2001-06 cease fire Theepan led various talks with the government/military and Norwegian mediators. Amongst those who had talks with Theepan were Defence Secretary Austin Fernando, Major General Sarath Fonseka, Major General Shantha Kottegoda, Major General Devinda Kalupahana (ret'd) and Major Shavendra Silva. Hostilities between the LTTE and the Sri Lankan military resumed in 2006. Under Theepan's command, Muhamalai became the bloodiest theatre of the war for the Sri Lankan armed forces. Theepan was reportedly injured in fighting in August 2006. He was also reportedly injured in an air raid on Kilinochchi in January 2008. Theepan became the de facto deputy military commander of the LTTE following the death Balraj in May 2008. After the fall of Kilinochchi in January 2009 the LTTE were forced to retreat east. Theepan was involved in heavy fighting as the LTTE battled to retain its dwindling territory. Theepan and his troops, together with other senior LTTE commanders, were surrounded by the military at Ananthapuram, Mullaitivu District. Bhanu, Lawrence and Keerthi broke out of the siege but Theepan refused to go, wanting instead to remain with his troops. The LTTE led by Bhanu tried unsuccessfully to rescue Theepan and his troops. Theepan was injured on 1 April and 2 April 2009. He suffered from internal bleeding and died on 4 April 2009. Theepan's body was identified by a doctor in military custody who had previously treated his chest wounds. Theepan's elder sister and other family members surrendered to the military. The Battle of Ananthapuram ended the next day, the LTTE had lost more than 600 cadres. Colonel Theepan is believed to have been promoted to Brigadier posthumously.
