= Bhathiya Jayatilleka =

Sri Lanka Army Officer

Brigadier Bhathiya Jayatilleka † RSP
- Born: 22 June 1964
- Died: 22 April 2000 (aged 35); Military hospital, Palali, Sri Lanka
- Military career
- Allegiance: Sri Lanka
- Branch: Sri Lanka Army
- Rank: Brigadier (posthumous)
- Unit: Sri Lanka Artillery
- Commands: Brigade commander, 54-1 brigade
- Conflicts: Sri Lankan Civil War, Insurrection 1987-89
- Awards: Rana Sura Padakkama

Brigadier W.A.A.P. Bhathiya Jayatilleka, RSP was a Sri Lankan Army officer who was the Brigade commander for the 54-1 brigade of the 54 Division based at Elephant Pass.

Educated at Royal College, Colombo, Jayatilleka joined the army after completing his schooling and was commissioned as a Second Lieutenant in the Sri Lanka Artillery, following his training at the Sri Lanka Military Academy.

He was serving as the Brigade commander for the 54-1 brigade of the 54 Division based at Elephant Pass at the outset of the Second Battle of Elephant Pass in 2000. Following orders from the GOC 54 Division to make a strategic withdrawal of troops from Elephant Pass due to a lack of water, Colonel Jayatilleka withdrew his troops in order. He died of dehydration on April 22, 2000, at the Palali Military Hospital. He was promoted to the rank of Brigadier posthumously.

Jayatilleka was married to the daughter of the former army commander General Hamilton Wanasinghe. His brother Captain Nalin Jayatilleke was killed in 1993 serving as a forward observation officer.

== Decorations ==
Brigadier Jayatilleka had received the Rana Sura Padakkama (RSP), the Sri Lanka Armed Services Long Service Medal, the Riviresa Campaign Services Medal and the North and East Operations Medal.

	Rana Sura Padakkama	
Sri Lanka Armed Services Long Service Medal	North and East Operations Medal	Riviresa Campaign Services Medal
