= Rohitha =

Rohitha is a given name. Notable people with the name include:

- Rohitha Abeygunawardena (born 1966), Sri Lankan politician
- Rohitha Neil Akmeemana, Sri Lanka Army officer
- Rohitha Bogollagama (born 1954), Sri Lankan lawyer
- Rohitha Kottahachchi (born 1971), Sri Lankan cricketer.
- Rohitha Rajapaksa (born 1989), Sri Lankan cricketer
