= Kokkilai Lagoon =

Sri Lankan lagoon

Kokkilai lagoon கொக்குளாய் කෝකිලායි
- Location within Sri Lanka
- Location: Mullaitivu District, Sri Lanka; Trincomalee District, Sri Lanka
- Coordinates: 9°0′N 80°56′E
- Type: Lagoon
- Primary inflows: Churiyan Aru
- Primary outflows: Indian Ocean
- Surface area: 29.95 square kilometres (11.56 sq mi)
- Max. depth: 4 metres (13 ft)
- Surface elevation: Sea level
- Settlements: Kokkilai; Kokkuthoduvai

Kokkilai lagoon (Tamil: கொக்குளாய்; Sinhala: කෝකිලායි) is an estuarine lagoon in Mullaitivu District and Trincomalee District, north-east Sri Lanka. The town of Kokkilai is located on a sand bar between the lagoon and the Indian Ocean.

The lagoon is fed by a number of small rivers, including Churiyan Aru. It is linked to the sea by a narrow channel that is very often blocked by the sand bar. The lagoon's water is brackish.

The lagoon is surrounded by a densely populated region containing cultivated land, scrubland and open forest. The land is used for prawn fishing, paddy cultivation and some shifting cultivation.

The lagoon has extensive sea grass beds and small areas of mangrove swamp and mudflats. The shallow waters of the lagoon attracts a wide variety of water birds including pelican, cormorant, herons, egrets, wild duck, stork, waders and pink flamingoes.

The lagoon was designated a wildlife sanctuary in 1951. It has since been popular for its bird sanctuary and boat safari amongst tourists.
