= Charles Anthony Brigade =

Sri Lankan military unit

Charles Antony Special Regiment
- சாள்ஸ் அன்ரனி சிறப்புப் படையணி
- Active: 10 April 1991 - 18 May 2009
- Country: Tamil Eelam
- Branch: Divisions of the Liberation Tigers of Tamil Eelam
- Type: Commando
- Role: Anti-tank warfare Artillery observer Close-quarters battle Counterattack; Counter-battery fire Demining; Direct action Force protection Guerrilla warfare Indirect fire Jungle warfare Maneuver warfare Military deception Military engineering Military intelligence Mountain warfare Patrolling; Raiding; Reconnaissance; Screening; Tracking; Urban warfare
- Size: Brigade
- Part of: Liberation Tigers of Tamil Eelam
- Mottos: இயலாத ஒன்று இருக்காது எமக்கு (Tamil: Nothing will be impossible for us)
- Colors: Dark green and Green
- Anniversaries: 10 April(Regimental day)
- Engagements: Sri Lankan Civil War

Commanders
- Colonel of the Regiment: Colonel Vimalan
- Notable commanders: Brig. Balraj, Colonel Gobith, Col. Nakulan, Lt. Col. Veeramani, Lt. Col. Amuthaap

Insignia
- Identification symbol

The Charles Antony Special Regiment, was a commando unit and the first conventional fighting formation created by the Liberation Tigers of Tamil Eelam (LTTE). It was founded on 10 April 1991, and was initially trained under the leadership of Brigadier Balraj.

It was the oldest and one of the most highly trained infantry units of the Tamil Tigers with its own military academies, research units and defence colleges for its officer corps. The soldiers in the unit all hailed from villages in the Northern Province.

The brigade made history during the Second Battle of Elephant Pass when it became the first non-state military regiment to defeat an entire infantry division (54 Division) in a conventional battle. Military analysts say that with the fall of Elephant pass, the Charles Anthony Special Regiment established the LTTE as the only non-state military force in the world capable of such complex manoeuvre war fighting.

The Elephant pass base was described as "impregnable" by a US army officer who visited the garrison months before its fall in April 2000 By October 2003, the regiment had lost 14 commanding officers and 1056 soldiers. The regiment was named after the LTTE's first military commander and a close associate to LTTE leader Velupillai Prabhakaran, Charles Lucas Anthony (Lt.Seelan). Lt.Seelan led the first ever attack on the Sri Lanka Army (SLA) by any Tamil militant group on 15 October 1981 when the LTTE ambushed an army jeep driving down the KKS Road in Jaffna, killing 2 soldiers.

The CASR fought in over 100 battles against the Sri Lanka Army including Operation Thavalai (Frog), Battle of Mullaitivu, Operation Jayasikurui, Operation Unceasing Waves II, Oddusuddan (1999), Second Battle of Elephant Pass, Battle of Jaffna, Battle of Kilinochchi and Battle of Ananthapuram. From its start to the end of civil war it has lost around 2200 soldiers in various battles.
