= Puliyankulam =

Puliyankulam புளியங்குளம் පුලියන්කුලම
- Town
- Location within Northern Province
- Coordinates: 8°57′0″N 80°31′0″E
- Country: Sri Lanka
- Province: Northern
- District: Vavuniya
- DS Division: Vavuniya North

Puliyankulam is a town in Vavuniya District, Sri Lanka. A road going through this town connects Mankulam to Vavuniya. Another road going through Puliyankulam connects Nedunkerny, Oddusuddan and Mullaitivu to Vavuniya.

== Transport ==
- Puliyankulam railway station

== See also ==
- Thandikulam–Omanthai offensive
- Operation Jayasikurui
