= Rohitha Neil Akmeemana =

Sri Lankan Army Officer

Brigadier Rohitha Neil Akmeemana † RSP
- Died: 22 April 2000; Palali
- Military career
- Allegiance: Sri Lanka
- Branch: Sri Lanka Army
- Service years: 1976–2000
- Rank: Brigadier (posthumous)
- Unit: Gemunu Watch
- Commands: Brigade commander, 54-2 Brigade
- Conflicts: Sri Lankan Civil War
- Awards: Rana Sura Padakkama

Brigadier Rohitha Neil Akmeemana RSP, USP was a senior Sri Lanka Army officer who served as Brigade Commander, 54-2 Brigade which was attached to the 54 Division during the Second Battle of Elephant Pass in April 2000.

Having joined the Sri Lanka Army as an officer cadet in 1976, he received his training at the Sri Lanka Military Academy and was commissioned as a Second Lieutenant in the 1st Battalion, Gemunu Watch. There he was a part of the regimental Cricket team which won the Army inter regimental Cricket tournament in 1979. During his military career spanning over 22 years, he held a number of battle commands in the 30-year-old ethnic conflict battling the LTTE. He was appointed as the first commanding officer of the 9th Battalion, Gemunu Watch on 24 January 1994 and commanded the unit in the eastern theater of war until 1995. In 1995 he was appointed as the centre commandant at the Gemunu Watch regimental headquarters in Kuruwita.

He was killed in action during the Second Battle of Elephant Pass during the SLA's strategic withdrawal following a massive LTTE offensive in April 2000. During the withdrawal his brigade acted as a rear guard alongside the Independent Special Forces brigade commanded by Major General Percy Fernando. After the withdrawal he died of dehydration on 22 April at the Palali hospital. He was serving in the rank of colonel as a brigade commander and was posthumously promoted to the rank of brigadier.

He was awarded the Rana Sura Padakkama and Uttama Seva Padakkama among other medals for gallantry and service.
