= Kokkuthoduvai =

Kokkuthoduvai or Kokkuththoduvai (pronounced Kokkuth-thodu-vai) is a Town in the Mullaitivu District, Sri Lanka. Some say it translates to 'a-place-where-you-can-touch-the-Egret'. It is located about 30 km southeast of the district capital Mullaitivu. It is a coastal town, located next to Kokkilai lagoon.

== See also ==
- Balasegaram Kandiah
