= Thandikulam–Omanthai offensive =

1997 battle in Sri Lanka

Thandikulam-Omanthai offensive
- Part of the Sri Lankan civil war, Operation Jayasikurui
Date	10 June 1997 – 25 June 1997(15 days)
Location	Sri Lanka
Result	Tamil Tigers victory

Belligerents
Military of Sri Lanka	Liberation Tigers of Tamil Eelam

Casualties and losses
700 killed 1,500 wounded	165 killed

The Thandikulam–Omanthai offensive was a battle for the control of the towns of Thandikulam and Omanthai in Sri Lanka in June 1997.

== Battle ==
The battle began on 10 June 1997, when LTTE fighters attacked the garrison at Thandikulam. They destroyed the bridge on the edge of town so no reinforcements could arrive. While the fighting was raging an arms dump was hit by a rocket, causing a huge explosion that resulted in many casualties. Another dump was also hit shortly after and caused the same result. Helicopter gunships were sent to try to assist the besieged soldiers, but one of them was badly damaged. Finally the town fell and the Tigers held it for two days, taking everything they could.

The LTTE attacked Omanthai thirteen days later. To get to Omanthai they had to go through Periyamadu, where 250 Sri Lankan soldiers were stationed. As the Tigers attacked, all of the soldiers deserted their bunkers and left a gap over 1 km (0.62 mi) long in the camp's perimeter. The Tigers took full advantage of the gap by swarming into Periyamadu and pushing their way deeper and deeper into SLA territory. Within minutes the Tigers had reached the main military base at Omanthai and headed straight for the artillery cannons. In heavy hand-to-hand combat, the Tigers took Omanthai, capturing six artillery pieces as well as several armoured vehicles.

== See also ==
- List of Sri Lankan Civil War battles
- Operation Jayasikurui
- Battle of Mullaitivu
- Oddusuddan offensive
