= Operation Jayasikurui =

1997–1999 Sri Lankan military operation

Operation Jayasikuru
- Part of the Sri Lankan civil war
Date	13 May 1997 – 9 February 1999 (1 year, 8 months and 27 days)
Location	Sri Lanka
Result	See aftermath

Belligerents
Military of Sri Lanka	Liberation Tigers of Tamil Eelam

Commanders and leaders
(Sri Lanka) Chandrika Kumaratunga (Sri Lanka) General Rohan Daluwatte (Sri Lanka) Brigadier Vasantha Perera (Sri Lanka) Brigadier Sarath Fonseka	Velupillai Prabhakaran; Colonel Theepan; Colonel Karuna Amman

Strength
5 Divisions: 50,000 soldiers 53 Division; 21 Division; 54 Division; 55 Division; 56 Division	5,000 soldiers: Charles Antony Special Regiment; Jeyanthan Regiment

Casualties and losses
4 months before the official end: 3,566 killed; 11,200 wounded; 1 Mil Mi-17 & 1 Mil Mi-24 destroyed; 21 Tanks (13 May – 27 August 1997) & other armoured vehicles destroyed	2,146 killed; unknown wounded

Operation Jayasikurui (Certain Victory) was a major military offensive launched by the Sri Lankan Army on 13 May 1997 during the Third Eelam War. Its principal objective was to establish a land connection between government-held territory in the Vanni and the Jaffna Peninsula by capturing the territory between Vavuniya and Kilinochchi and reopening the A9 highway, the main overland supply route to Jaffna. The operation was one of the largest ground offensives undertaken by the Sri Lankan military during the conflict and involved several army divisions supported by artillery and armoured units.

The offensive initially secured territory along the Vanni front, including the capture of Puliyankulam junction in November 1997, following earlier advances by government forces. However, the Sri Lankan Army encountered increasingly organised resistance from the Liberation Tigers of Tamil Eelam (LTTE), which employed fortified defensive positions, counterattacks and anti-armour tactics to impede the advance. On 4 December 1997, an LTTE counteroffensive near Kanagarayankulam inflicted heavy casualties on elements of the Army's 53 Division, forcing a withdrawal and prompting a reassessment of the offensive's operational strategy.

Despite subsequent efforts to continue the campaign, the Army was unable to achieve its principal objective of reaching Kilinochchi and restoring the A9 highway. The government subsequently shifted its military strategy towards consolidating its territorial positions and conducting operations in other parts of the Vanni. Operation Jayasikurui was formally called off on 2 December 1998 and replaced by Operation Rivi Bala, marking the end of an extended campaign that had resulted in significant territorial gains but failed to establish the intended land connection to the Jaffna Peninsula.

== Background ==
Following Operation Riviresa in 1995, the Sri Lankan military gained control over the Jaffna Peninsula. The LTTE withdrew to the jungles of the Wanni from where in 1996 they launched an attack on the isolated Sri Lanka Army (SLA) garrison in Mullaitivu.

After the Battle of Mullaitivu the LTTE gained control over the Mullaitivu district, since the government did not re-establish a base due to the lack of a land supply route to it. Instead, at the request of the deputy minister of defence, Gen. Anurudha Ratwatte, the military forces began to plan a large-scale operation to open a land route to Jaffna.

== The battle ==
The operation launched on 13 May 1997, with the 53rd Division spearheading the offensive along with the 21st, 54th, 55th and 56th Divisions. It was preceded by a massive artillery and aerial bombardment, with the SLA breaking out of their fortifications at Vavuniya and Manal Aru and pushing into LTTE-controlled Vanni.

The stated objective of the operation was to capture the A9 Highway, running from Vavuniya to the Jaffna peninsula, thereby allowing the establishment of a main supply route (MSR) to the SLA's isolated Jaffna garrison. It was also meant to engage and draw the LTTE out of its secure jungle bases. The Tigers could then be crippled, if not destroyed, by the SLA's superior firepower. The SLA wanted to diminish the strength of the LTTE by the end of the year so that it had to fight only a low-intensity guerrilla war.

The operation was very ambitious from the start, requiring large numbers of troops for both offensive operations and the defense of the captured territory. As a result, units of the Sri Lanka Navy and the Sri Lanka Air Force were deployed for ground operations in support of the SLA.

The LTTE also staged a number of counterattacks against SLA positions throughout the campaign. One was during June 1997, when the Tigers launched attacks on the SLA-held towns of Thandikulam and Omanthai. TamilNet claimed that the attacks left 700 SLA soldiers dead and some 1,500 wounded in contrast to only 165 dead rebels.

In addition, the SLA garrison at Mannakulam was also attacked on 4 December 1997; 146 SLA soldiers were killed in the fighting along with an unknown number of LTTE.

The operation nevertheless did not manage to accomplish over half of its objectives. By mid-May 1998 it had completely stalled. The LTTE didn't show any resistance initially, but at Puliyankulam, LTTE troops led by Brig. Theepan showed huge resistance and blocked the Army at Puliyankulam for more than 4 months. LTTE cadres penetrated SLA lines and sabotaged a major staging area, destroying vast quantities of supplies and killing dozens of troops. Puliyankulam was meant to be the linking-up point for the twin prongs of the SLA assault. However, the LTTE had built effective defenses at the village and after three months of heavy fighting the SLA had to withdraw after suffering hundreds of casualties and dozens of tanks destroyed.

The LTTE cadres at Puliyankulam had irrevocably delayed the SLA's advance and the operation could no longer be completed on time. With stiff resistance in place, the Army bypassed Puliyankulam and maneuvered through jungles and reached another village called Kanakarayankulam, hoping to outmaneuver the LTTE cadres, but the LTTE managed to hold off the Army's advance.

Unable to break LTTE defense lines, the SLA decided to open the battle on multiple fronts. As the fight continued, defense lines become very long, stretching from Nay-Aaru all the way to Mannar. The fighting would continue for several months but the critical A9 highway (between Mankulam and Kilinochchi) remained in the LTTE's occupation.

In 1998, the SLA moved some of its forces from Kilinochchi towards the south, leaving the entire district vulnerable. In September 1998, the LTTE launched its "Operation Unceasing Waves II", resulting in the capture of the entire Kilinochchi district. Brutal fighting continued on the A9 highway. LTTE admitted to losing some 1,300 fighters during the course of actions in the first year of the Jayasikurui counter battles.

== Aftermath ==
Following the conclusion of Operation Jayasikurui in December 1998, the government continued its military campaign in the Vanni, shifting its immediate focus towards consolidating territory already captured and improving the Army's strategic position. Operation Rivi Bala was launched east of the A9 highway, resulting in the capture of Oddusuddan and the establishment of additional government positions. In March 1999, the Army launched Operation Ranagosa, a series of offensives west of the highway. These operations brought substantial territory under government control, with Ranagosa IV securing a further 358 square kilometres in June 1999.

Although Jayasikurui had failed to achieve its principal objective of reopening the land route to Jaffna, the subsequent operations demonstrated the government's continued capacity to conduct large-scale offensives and expand its territorial presence in the Vanni. The LTTE, however, retained considerable military strength and launched Operation Unceasing Waves III in November 1999, recapturing several areas previously taken by government forces. The resulting reversals exposed the difficulties of maintaining an extended military front while continuing offensive operations across the region.

The military campaign took place alongside the Kumaratunga government's efforts to pursue a political settlement to the ethnic conflict. The government had introduced constitutional proposals for extensive devolution of power to regional administrations, seeking to address Tamil demands for greater autonomy while preserving Sri Lanka's territorial integrity. However, the proposals encountered substantial opposition, and the United National Party's rejection of the revised constitutional package in February 1998 contributed to the failure of the initiative to secure parliamentary approval.

The government subsequently continued to pursue both military and diplomatic approaches. In 1999, President Kumaratunga sought Norwegian assistance in facilitating renewed negotiations with the LTTE. However, the organisation's continued military operations, combined with the unresolved constitutional and political disagreements, prevented the emergence of a lasting settlement. The conflict therefore continued into 2000, when the LTTE captured the strategically important Elephant Pass military complex.

The human cost of the operation was high, with both sides sustaining heavy casualties. The government admitted to losing around 1,350 soldiers since the start of the operation, although some independent western analysts thought that the figure could surpass 1500.

== See also ==
- Operation Riviresa
- Battle of Mullaitivu
- Thandikulam-Omanthai offensive
- Oddusuddan offensive
