= Oddusuddan offensive (1999) =

Military operation in Sri Lanka

Oddusuddan offensive Operation Unceasing Waves III
- Part of the Sri Lankan civil war
Date	Oct – Nov 1999
Location	Sri Lanka
Result	Tamil Tigers victory

Belligerents
Military of Sri Lanka	Liberation Tigers of Tamil Eelam

Commanders and leaders
Unknown	Unknown

Strength
Unknown	Unknown

Casualties and losses
800 killed, wounded or missing	Unknown

The Oddusuddan offensive was a military operation in which the Tamil Tigers captured Oddusuddan from the Sri Lankan Army. They were also believed to have captured large amounts of weapons and ammunition as well as armoured vehicles during the operation. The offensive was part of Operation Unceasing Waves III.

== See also ==
- List of Sri Lankan Civil War battles
- Operation Jayasikurui
- Battle of Mullaitivu
- Thandikulam-Omanthai offensive
