= Battle of Aanandapuram =

Battle of the Sri Lankan civil war

Coordinates: 9°19′33″N 80°43′50″E

- Part of Sri Lankan Civil War, 2008–2009 SLA Northern offensive
Date	29 March – 5 April 2009
Location	Aanandapuram, Sri Lanka
Result	Decisive Sri Lankan Army victory
Territorial changes	Aanandapuram area regained by the Government of Sri Lanka

Belligerents
Military of Sri Lanka	Liberation Tigers of Tamil Eelam

Commanders and leaders
Sarath Fonseka; Shavendra Silva; Kamal Gunaratne; G.V. Ravipriya	(Liberation Tigers of Tamil Eelam) Velupillai Prabhakaran (Liberation Tigers of Tamil Eelam) Pottu Amman (Liberation Tigers of Tamil Eelam) Brigadier Theepan † (Liberation Tigers of Tamil Eelam) Brigadier Bhanu (Liberation Tigers of Tamil Eelam) Brigadier Thurga † (Liberation Tigers of Tamil Eelam) Brigadier Vithusa † (Liberation Tigers of Tamil Eelam) Brigadier Gaddafi † (Liberation Tigers of Tamil Eelam) Brigadier Manivannan †

Units involved
Sri Lanka Army; 58 Division; 53 Division; Task Force 8	Liberation Tigers of Tamil Eelam

Strength
Sri Lanka Armed Forces: 50,000 soldiers	Liberation Tigers of Tamil Eelam: ≈1000 cadres

Casualties and losses
Unknown	Three 130mm artillery, several mortars,1 jeep, 3 pickup trucks mounted with 14.5mm & 1 AA gun captured

The Battle of Aanandapuram was a land battle fought between the Sri Lankan Military, 58 Division, 53 Division and Task Force 8 and the Liberation Tigers of Tamil Eelam (LTTE) for the control of the last stronghold held by the LTTE. This battle was a part of the Northern Theatre of Eelam War IV during the Sri Lankan civil war. The battle was fought in the Aanandapuram area of Puthukkudiyirippu AGA Sri Lanka.

== Build up ==
Since the start of the northern offensive in 2008, the Sri Lankan Army had been steadily progressing on multiple fronts. As the LTTE had limited men and firepower, it was gradually withdrawing towards the North East part of the country. Finally they were confined to a small littoral strip of territory located between the A-35 highway (Paranthan-Mullaitheevu road) Nanthikadal and Chalai lagoons on one side and the Indian Ocean on the other.

More than 50,000 soldiers from five divisions and three task forces besieged the LTTE. The Tigers were trying desperately to break out of this encirclement and drive the forces back. Against this backdrop the LTTE planned to launch a massive counter-offensive against the armed forces. The idea was to conduct a carefully planned operation that would deliver a crippling blow to the security forces although the Tigers were outnumbered 50 to 1.

== The battle ==
On 30 March LTTE launched a massive attack on SLA front line in the Puthukuduyirippu area, advancing out of the no-fire zone. LTTE advanced towards Puthukudiyirippu facing stiff resistance by Sri Lankan Army forces. The SLA's 53rd and 58th divisions and Task Force 8 advanced out of Puthukkudiyiruppu in a pincer movement intended to outflank the LTTE Charles Anthony regiment, which held the eastward-running Puthukkudiyiruppu-Iranappaalai-Puthumaathalan road. A brigade of the 58th Division swung east and then south, while another brigade from the 53rd, along with TF8, attacked east and then north. Toth pincers met at Pachaipullumottai junction to the rear of the Charles Anthony regiment, cutting the footpath between Ambalaranpokkanai to Pachaipullumotti, which serve as an LTTE supply line. The Tigers fought fiercely to prevent the encirclement but were overwhelmed. Government special forces set an ambush in the coconut trees east of the pocket, cutting off routes of reinforcement for the LTTE trapped in Aanandapuram. A convoy consisting of a reinforced company of Tigers under Col Lawrence attempted to reach the 2 km square pocket, but they were ambushed and destroyed by waiting special forces. Injured, Lawrence managed to escape with a few survivors. The army moved in heavy support weapons, artillery and multiple-barrel rocket launchers. By 5 April, the battle was over. This was a decisive battle in the 2008–2009 Sri Lankan Army Northern offensive. Close to 75% of the LTTE's forces were lost, and suffered its largest loss of command staff in a single battle.

== LTTE casualties ==
=== Senior LTTE leaders killed ===
- Brigadier Theepan (Overall commander of the LTTE northern front fighting formations)
- Brigadier Viduthalai alias Amuthan alias Gaddafi (Bodyguard of LTTE leader Velupillai Prabhakaran, later, special commander of the Imran-Pandian regiment)
- Brigadier Manivannan (Special Commander of the "Kittu" artillery brigade)
- Brigadier Durga alias Meezhika (Special commander of Sothiya regiment)
- Brigadier Vidhusha alias Yaazhini (Special commander of Maalathi regiment)
- Colonel Nagesh (Deputy commander of the Jayanthan Regiment)
- Colonel Gopith (Commander of the Charles Anthony Special Regiment)
- Colonel Kamalini (Deputy Commander of Maalathi regiment)
- Colonel Ilankeeran alias A Cheton (AC) (Commander of Victor anti-armor regiment)
- Colonel Mohana (Deputy commander of Sothia regiment)
- Colonel Gopal (Deputy commander of the "Kutty Sri" mortar brigade)
- Colonel Amudha (Women division Chief of the "Kutty Sri" mortar brigade)
- Colonel Asmi (Commander of "Ponnamman" mining unit)
- Colonel Tamil Selvi alias Mathi (Commander of Malathi regiment)
- Colonel Anton (Chief of LTTE Trincomalee Intelligence department(TOSIS))
- Colonel Ellalan
- Lieutenant Colonel Saththiyappiriya alias Eekaiyoli (Commander of Women Political division Regiment)
- Lieutenant Colonel Makeenthiram (Chief of 'Sea Resource' department)
- Lieutenant Colonel Vaakiisan
- Lieutenant Colonel Seralaathan (In-charge of the Tiger TV "Nitharsanam")
- Lieutenant Colonel Meyyarivu (Imran-Pandian regiment)
- Lieutenant Colonel Rajesh (Imran-Pandian regiment)
- Lieutenant Colonel Akilesh (Imran-Pandian regiment)
- Lieutenant Colonel Nalan (Special Officer of Imran-Pandian regiment)
- Lieutenant Colonel Amuthaap (Deputy commander of the Charles Anthony special regiment)
- Lieutenant Colonel Abdulaah
- Lieutenant Colonel Puratchi Nilaa(Commander of Malathi regiment's commanding post)

=== Senior LTTE leaders killed (Ranks unknown) ===
- Mahindan (Senior Sea Tiger Commander)
- Aadithyan (Manal Aru attack commander)
- Iniyavan (Special commander of Radha air-defence regiment)
- Maankuyil (One of the commanders of LTTE Intelligence department(TOSIS))

Other Senior leaders named Ashvini, Anjchaan, Vannam, Aaral.

=== Killed senior Commanders of Radha Air-Protection regiment ===
- Colonel Veengaiyan alias Aiyanaar (Commander of Radha air-defence regiment)
- Lieutenant Colonel Anbu (Deputy commander of Radha air-defence regiment)
- Lieutenant Colonel Anushan
- Lieutenant Colonel Kapilan (one of the commanders of Radha air-defence regiment)
- Lieutenant Colonel Anthias
- Lieutenant Colonel Ilavarasan
- Lieutenant Colonel Aarraloon
- Lieutenant Colonel Perungkeeran
- Lieutenant Colonel Ezhisai
- Lieutenant Colonel Mathivarman
- Lieutenant Colonel Vallavan
- Lieutenant Colonel Kulam
- Lieutenant Colonel Kannan
- Lieutenant Colonel Niranjan
- Lieutenant Colonel Thayaaparan
- Lieutenant Colonel Mainthen (one of the commanders of Radha air-defence regiment)
- Lieutenant Colonel Vannam (one of the commanders of Radha air-defence regiment)

Some of these Radha regiments Commanders breached the SLA's siege on Aananthapuram from outside on the evening of 31 March and entered into the besieged Aananthapuram region, with the goal of rescuing their cadres who were trapped inside. The SLA defenses proved difficult to breach, and all of the commanders along with their cadres were killed by SLA.

=== Alampil Landing ===
This was done by LTTE to break the Anandhapuram box and to rescue their cadres. It failed due to the heavy shelling from the Sri Lankan Army and was repelled by SLA. On 04.04.2009, Senior LTTE Commanders Brigadier Jayram, Attack commander of LTTE intelligence department(TOSIS) Colonel Veerathevan, †(Later killed in this landing) and Commander Colonel Peerinpam were handed over the task of landing eighty LTTE Cadres and their supplies from Mullivaikal to Nayarru Hill by LTTE Chief Velupillai Prabhakaran in order to evacuate the cadres who were trapped in the Aananthapuram box to Mullivaikkal.

Accordingly, the LTTE supply teams consisting of fifteen Boats were ordered to provide security for the landing teams by LTTE Admiral Soosai.The Sea Tigers attack teams were also deployed on the evening of 03.04.2009 to ensure that the Sri Lanka Navy did not interfere with the landing.

While the LTTE boats were being launched, they were identified by the Sri Lankan Army and were shelled. Despite the dangers, the distribution teams continued with the tasks assigned to them. At 3 in the morning on 04.04.2009, the team led by Colonel Veerathevan landed first.

They were a small team, and their fighters were inexperienced in long-distance voyages. They lacke cover for fighting against the Sri Lankan Army units, who was on the shore and receiving continuous reinforced. Between 20-25 LTTE fighters were killed in that Landing, according to the SLAs wartime report. Later, Col. Veerathevan's body was recovered from the seashore by the SLA.

As the attempt was unsuccessful, other fighters did not attempt to make a landing. They returned safely and arrived in Mullivaikkal with the help of the Sea attack teams (Nalaayini special Sea attack team and Charles special sea attack team) of Sea tigers.

== See also ==
- 2008–09 Sri Lankan Army Northern offensive
- Alleged war crimes during the Sri Lankan Civil War
- List of attacks attributed to the LTTE
