= Vellamullivaikkal =

- Village
- Vellamullivaikkal, Mullaitivu
- Coordinates: 9°18′N 80°47′E
- Country: Sri Lanka
- Province: Northern Province
- District: Mullaitivu District
- Time zone: UTC+5:30 (Sri Lanka Standard Time Zone)

Vellamullivaikal is a small town in Sri Lanka. It is located within the Mullaitivu District, Northern Province. The village is notable as the place where the final battle was fought in Sri Lankan Civil War.

== See also ==
- List of towns in Northern Province, Sri Lanka
