= Ananthapuram, Sri Lanka =

Ananthapuram ஆனந்தபுரம் අනන්තපුර
- Village
- Location in the Northern Province
- Coordinates: 9°19′33″N 80°43′50″E
- Country: Sri Lanka
- Province: Northern
- District: Mullaitivu
- DS Division: Puthukkudiyiruppu

Government
  - Type: Divisional Council
  - Body: Puthukudiyiruppu
  - Chairman: None
  - Village Officer: S. Thayaseelan
- Time zone: UTC+5:30 (Sri Lanka Standard Time Zone)
- Post Codes: 4409040
- Vehicle registration: NP

Ananthapuram (Tamil: ஆனந்தபுரம்) is a village in north-eastern Sri Lanka. It is located approximately 4 kilometres (2.5 mi) north east of the town of Puthukkudiyiruppu and is by the A35 Paranthan-Mullaitivu highway. The village is one of nine in the Ananthapuram GN Division (Village Officer Division).

Eastern Mullaitivu District including Ananthapuram witnessed particularly brutal fighting between the Sri Lankan military and the rebel Liberation Tigers of Tamil Eelam in the final months of the Sri Lankan Civil War in early 2009. The Battle of Aanandapuram, one of the last major battles in civil war was fought at Ananthapuram. A United Nations report found that as many as 40,000 civilians may have been killed in the final months of the civil war, mostly as a result of indiscriminate shelling by the Sri Lankan military. There are widespread allegations that both sides committed atrocities and human rights violations including war crimes.

After the end of the war in May 2009 the residents of the village, along with most of Mullaitivu District, were held by the Sri Lankan military internment camps in Vavuniya District. Much of eastern Mullaitivu District including Ananthapuram were declared as High Security Zone and were out of bounds to the public. This meant that when the census took place in March 2012 there were only three residents in Ananthapuram GN Division. Resettlement in the GN Division began in September 2012 and by February 2013 the population was 735. However, many of Ananthapuram's residents weren't resettled in their own homes but in newly cleared areas of jungles.
