= Oddusuddan =

Oddusuddan ஒட்டுசுட்டான் ඔඪුසුඪන්
- Town
- Location within Northern Province
- Coordinates: 9°09′0″N 80°39′0″E
- Country: Sri Lanka
- Province: Northern
- District: Mullaitivu
- DS Division: Oddusuddan

Oddusuddan is a town in the Mullaitivu District, Sri Lanka. In Tamil Oddu-suddan translates to 'roof-tile-making-place'. It is located nearly halfway between Maankulam and Mullaitivu on highway A34.

A Red clay factory is planned to be built as PPP project in the area to enhance the livelihood development in the area.

== See also ==
- Oddusuddan offensive
