= Second Battle of Elephant Pass =

2000 battle of the Sri Lankan civil war

- Part of Eelam War III; Sri Lankan civil war
Date	11 December 1999–23 April 2000
Location	Elephant Pass, Sri Lanka 09°31′N 80°24′E
Result	LTTE victory

Belligerents
Sri Lanka	Liberation Tigers of Tamil Eelam

Commanders and leaders
Lt. Gen Srilal Weerasooriya; Maj. Gen Egodawella; Brig Percy Fernando †; Col Bhathiya Jayatilleka †; Col Neil Akmeemana †; Col Harish Hewarachi †; Lt. Col Hewage Hewawasam †	Velupillai Prabhakaran; Brigadier Vithusha; Colonel Soosai; Colonel Balraj; Colonel Theepan; Colonel Bhanu; Lt. Colonel Lakshiya †

Strength
~15,000	~5,000

Casualties and losses
1,000+ killed 100+ missing 1,687 wounded	LTTE Claim: 303 killed across all three phases, including 35 killed at the final battle for the base. Government claim: 1,000 KIA during all three phases of the fighting.
- Location of base in Northern Province, Sri Lanka

The Second Battle of Elephant Pass (code-named Operation Unceasing Waves III (ஓயாத அலைகள் மூன்று) by the Liberation Tigers of Tamil Eelam), was fought from December 1999 to April 2000 for the control of the Sri Lankan military base in Elephant Pass, Jaffna.

== Background ==
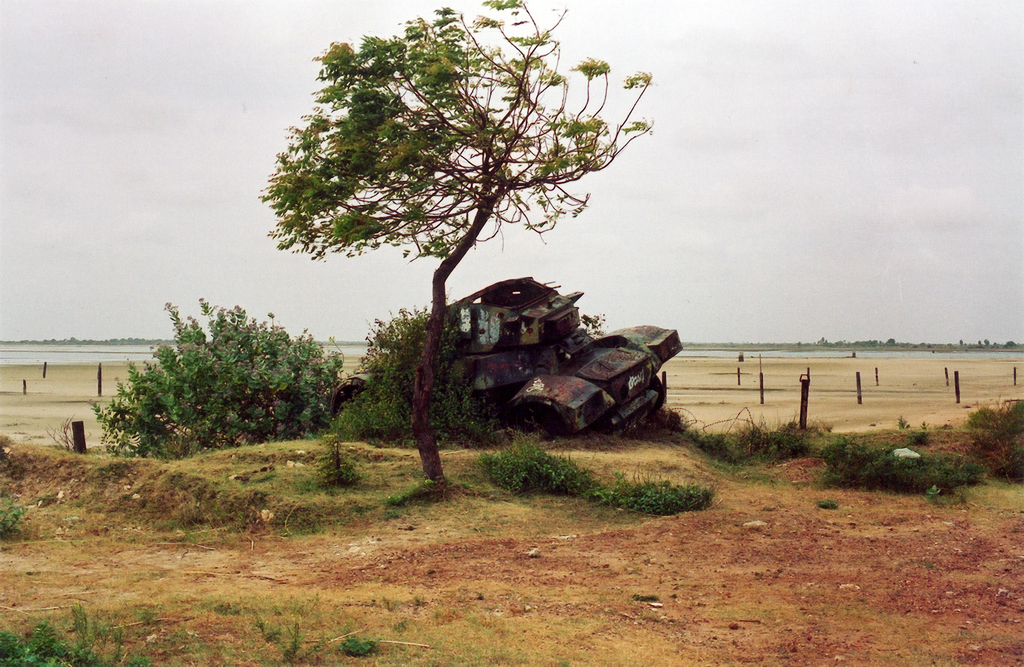
A SLAC Daimler Armoured Car destroyed at Elephant Pass in the earlier part of the war.

Elephant Pass links the Jaffna Peninsula to the rest of the mainland by a narrow strip of land and is known as the Gateway to Jaffna. The Jaffna-Kandy road, the A-9 Highway and the railway line to Jaffna run through Elephant Pass, making the narrow strip of land in a sense the gateway to Jaffna. Elephant Pass has been home to a strategic military base since 1760, when the Portuguese built a fort there, which was later rebuilt and garrisoned by the Dutch in 1776 and later by the British. Since the start of the Sri Lankan Civil War, the Sri Lanka Army maintained a detachment at Elephant Pass, having established a permanent base.

In 1991 the LTTE made their first attempt to take the Elephant Pass base. The attack failed and the Tigers suffered over 500 casualties. Elephant Pass remained under government control, although much of the Jaffna Peninsula fell to LTTE control in the early 1990s. In 1995, in Operation Riviresa the Sri Lankan military recaptured the Jaffna Peninsula and Elephant Pass became the southern flank of the Sri Lankan forces in Jaffna. It became the springboard for several offensives, such as Operation Sath Jaya. After the LTTE recaptured Kilinochchi in 1998, Elephant Pass once again became the southern flank of the Sri Lankan forces in Jaffna. By late 1999, the forward defense line of Elephant Pass was at Paranthan. By this time the Sri Lanka Army base at Elephant Pass had been expanded with a complex of military installations under the command of the 54 Division with over 5000 personnel attached.

The Operation Jayasikurui was stopped from reaching Jaffna with forces from the east led by Karuna Amman playing a significant role and later counter-offensives reversed some of the gains of Operation Jayasikurui. After his success Karuna and his forces returned east to consolidate territory while leaving some members to fight in Elephant pass.

Given these circumstances, LTTE leader Prabakaran changed his strategy to take Elephant Pass by gradually encircling and weakening the troops inside, cutting off supplies and, in effect, strangling the base. The idea was to avoid a frontal assault that would have led to the loss of many LTTE lives, since the army had numerical and logistical superiority. The Elephant Pass isthmus is of strategic importance, as it links the northern mainland known as Wanni with the Jaffna Peninsula.

== Battle ==
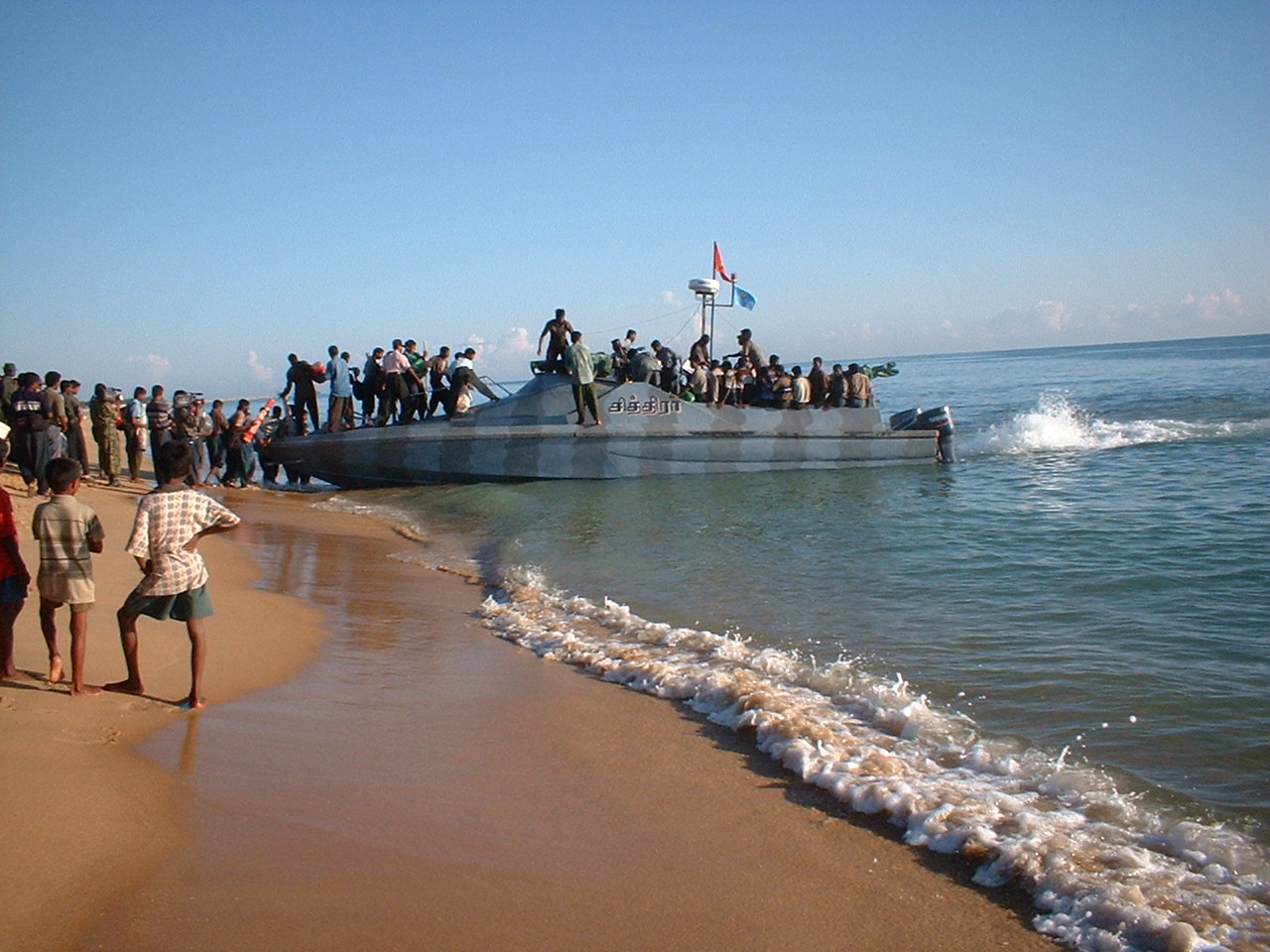
LTTE cadres embarking a Sea Tigers boat.

LTTE planned Operation Unceasing Waves III with the objective of taking control of the peninsula and launched its first stage on 11 December 1999 with seaward landings at Vettalankerny east of Elephant Pass, engaging the 2nd Gemunu Watch which had been deployed there. LTTE cadres began to infiltrate the defense line and army commando teams were sent in to counter these invitations; skirmishing continued until the army withdrew to a new defense line around Iyakachchi junction. At this point the LTTE launched a massive artillery bombardment on the forward defense line at Paranthan with all of their artillery and armor, much of which they had captured from the army in past battles. The army had deployed three infantry battalions to defend Paranthan and these suffered heavy casualties in the first days of the battle. The 53 Division had been moved to the Elephant Pass sector and its units dispersed along the fronts. The 8th Battalion, Gajaba Regiment (8th Gajaba) had suffered 150 killed from its strength of 400. The brigade HQ based at the old Paranthan chemical factory provided artillery support; however, communications were disrupted after several army radio sets were captured by the LTTE and they began jamming radio frequencies. A few days later the army withdrew to the second line of defense at the brigade HQ, which was abandoned, and a new defense line was formed. On 17 December the Sri Lanka Air Force lost a Mil Mi-24 while repulsing a seaward attack by the LTTE on Thamilamadam, its pilot Squadron Leader Tyron Silvapulle was posthumously awarded the Parama Weera Vibhushanaya. The army was running short on food and reinforcements as casualties mounted. Reinforced by the 3rd Sri Lanka Light Infantry, this line held, and the LTTE began infiltrating it with cadres dressed in army uniform. The LTTE thereafter made a landing from Pooneryn, opening up a third front from west of Elephant Pass. Highly accurate artillery and mortar bombardment from the LTTE caused heavy casualties among commando units sent to stop the LTTE infiltrations from Pooneryn; 8th Gajaba, which had been moved to Vettalankerny, was down to 94 soldiers.

In March 2000 Army Commander Lt. Gen. Srilal Weerasooriya carried out several changes to the command structure following reports of low morale among troops in Jaffna. At this time there was a series of Commanders of the Security Forces Headquarters – Jaffna (SFHQ-J) the apex command of the Jaffna sector including Elephant Pass which had been under siege for months. Maj. Gen. Sarath Munasinghe, who had been the Commander, SFHQ-J from 11 November 1999 to 12 December 1999, had retired and been succeeded by Maj. Gen. Nihal Jayakody, who died on 19 January 2000 after having suffered a heart attack. He was succeeded by Maj. Gen. A.M.C.W.B. Senewirathna. In March, Weerasooriya appointed Maj. Gen. Janaka Perera as the Overall Operational Commander, North and Maj. Gen. Sarath Fonseka as Commander, SFHQ-J. Weerasooriya also sent the 55 Division to Jaffna under the command of Maj. Gen. Sivali Wanigasekara to bolster the 30,000 troops already in Jaffna, the move taking over a month to complete by sea and air.

In April 2000 the LTTE breached the Vettalankerny line. Black Tigers stormed into the Iyakkachchi military base in the early hours of the morning in a multi-pronged assault and overran the well-fortified camp after several hours of intense fighting. LTTE rebels penetrated the central base, destroying several artillery pieces, tanks, armored vehicles and ammunition dumps. The capture of Iyakachchi proved to be a major tactical move, since located at Iyakachchi were the only freshwater wells that supplied Elephant Pass and Paranthan. The 54 Division under Maj. Gen. Egodawela attempted to recapture Iyakachchi from the south, but failed. Two fresh battalions—the 1st Sinha and the 9th Gajaba—were airlifted from Vavuniya to Palay and sent from the road to attack the LTTE front line in Iyakachchi. The battalions breached the first line but got trapped in the no-mans-land between the LTTE first and second lines, taking heavy casualties. When the 9th Gajaba withdrew the next day it had suffered over 70 dead and 600 wounded—its fighting capacity had been reduced to 130 from 800 in a matter of hours.

The camp was equipped with machinery for desalination of water, but it had broken down and not been repaired. Finding the situation at Elephant Pass untenable due to the lack of fresh water, the order was given by Maj. Gen. Perera to Maj. Gen. Egodawela to withdraw the 54 Division from Elephant Pass. Since the main road linking the base had been cut off, the withdrawal was to be made on foot. Orders had been given to destroy the five artillery guns, the 11 120mm mortars and all ammunition dumps at Elephant Pass, before having the troops withdraw on foot northwards. An unauthorized attempt was made to move the guns and in the process these were captured by the LTTE. At 6:00 pm on 20 April 2000, the withdrawal began with troops crossing across LTTE-controlled areas to make it to the army's Soranpattu-Palai line. Maj. Gen. Egodawela crossed over in a tank and his deputy Brigadier Percy Fernando remained behind to move with the troops, commanding the rear guard for a fighting withdrawal. Over 300 troops were killed and 500 wounded in the withdrawal, including the senior officers of the 54 Division—Brigadier Percy Fernando, Col. Bhathiya Jayatilleka, Col. Rohitha Neil Akmeemana, Col. Harish Hewarachchi and Lt. Col. Hewage Hewawasam. As soon as the army withdrew from Elephant Pass, the LTTE moved in and took over the complex. The LTTE women's brigade chief, Lakshiya, was reported killed in the fighting. In the battle, the LTTE was able to capture three long-range 152 mm Type 66 gun-howitzers, two 122 mm Type 60 howitzers, 12 120mm mortars, one 25 mm cannon, several .50-cal. machine guns, hundreds of rocket-propelled grenades and thousands of automatic rifles. The Tigers also captured several armored vehicles, tanks, military trucks, bulldozers and high-tech communication systems. The Battle of Elephant Pass is considered as the largest military débacle in the history of the Sri Lankan Armed Forces.

== Aftermath ==
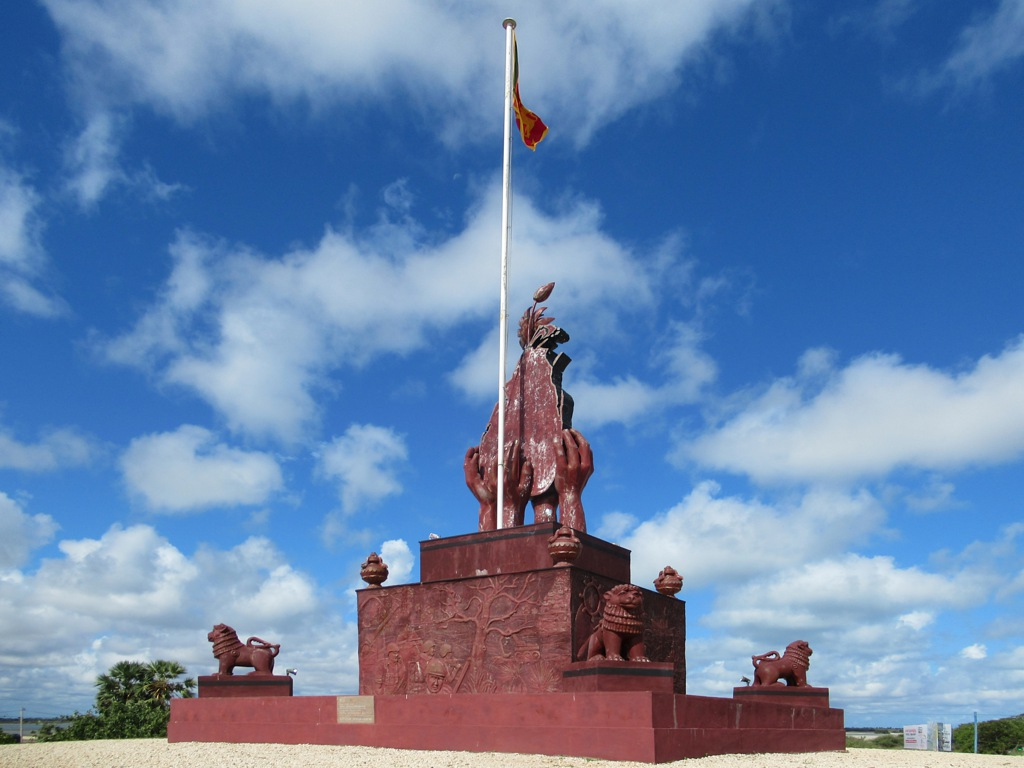
The post war monument at Elephant Pass.

Fighting continued until mid-May for control of the Jaffna peninsula, and by 9 May Deputy Defence Minister Anuruddha Ratwatte reported that 758 soldiers had been killed, 2,368 had been wounded, and 349 were missing since the battle for Elephant Pass started on 22 April. Opposition leader Ranil Wickramasinghe claimed that 300 soldiers had been captured by the LTTE, and in later days they handed over 126 bodies to the ICRC. The progress of the LTTE raised concerns about the future of around 35,000 troops in the Jaffna Peninsula. The fear was that the Tigers, with their rapid mobility and artillery firepower, could quickly take over the entire peninsula. With the possibility of the army facing an irreversible catastrophe in Jaffna, President Kumaratunga requested India to help evacuate the army from Jaffna, but India declined. Barely days before the fall of the Elephant Pass base, President Chandrika Kumaratunga made some abrupt changes in the defense structure; retired Chief of the Defence Staff Rohan Daluwatte was placed in overall charge of the three services, Gen. Janaka Perera was made Northern Province Commander and Gen. Sarath Fonseka the Jaffna Commander; the former had insisted on the latter. The LTTE pushed towards Jaffna, but in the following large-scale battles along defense lines that offered little tactical leverage, they suffered heavy casualties in confrontations with Sri Lankan forces that were well equipped with heavy artillery, air support and superior numbers. Despite gaining footholds in the areas of Chavekachechri and Ariyalai, the LTTE was forced to retreat to the Muhamalai and Nagarkovil defensive lines after suffering heavy losses from artillery and airstrikes. Although the fall of Elephant Pass was seen as a great triumph, a series of setbacks highlighted LTTE's weakness against conventional military forces in regular conflict.

On 3 September 2000, the army mounted a massive counteroffensive, named "Agni Keila", to retake some of the LTTE-held territories to the south of its defensive lines, but after advancing a few kilometers, the troops met heavy resistance. The army was hampered by the presence of two narrow strips of land over which their forces had to advance. The LTTE had registered all its artillery and mortars in this area. In addition, it had extensively booby-trapped the strips of land, rendering them extremely dangerous for armored units. Although the army claimed that it managed to advance well into the LTTE lines, heavy casualties forced a withdrawal to its original positions.

In 2006, fighting renewed for control of the Jaffna peninsula. Sri Lankan troops and Tamil Tiger rebels fought pitched battles for control of the peninsula, which left hundreds dead in a matter of months. In a major offensive launched by the Sri Lanka Armed Forces, Elephant Pass was recaptured on 9 January 2009.

== See also ==
- First Battle of Elephant Pass
- Operation Unceasing Waves I
- Operation Unceasing Waves II
- List of Sri Lankan Civil War battles
