= 54 Division (Sri Lanka) =

- 54 Division flag
- Active: 1999 - 2000; 10 September 2010 – present
- Country: Sri Lanka
- Branch: Sri Lanka Army
- Size: 22,698
- Part of: Security Forces Headquarters – Wanni
- Garrison/HQ: Thallady, Northern Province
- Engagements: Second Battle of Elephant Pass

Commanders
- Current commander: Major General G.J.A.W Galagamage

The 54 Division is a division of the Sri Lanka Army. It was established in 1999 to garrison and defend the strategic Elephant Pass and was forced to withdraw north following the Second Battle of Elephant Pass in 2000, after which it was disbanded. The division was reestablished on 10 September 2010, the division is currently based in Thallady in the Northern Province. The division is a part of Security Forces Headquarters – Wanni and has three brigades and six battalions. Major General G.J.A.W Galagamage has been commander of the division since 28 August 2017. The division is responsible for 1,417 square kilometres (547 sq mi) of territory.

== Organisation ==
The division is currently organised as follows:

- 541 Brigade
  - 24th Battalion, Vijayabahu Infantry Regiment
  - 21st Volunteer Battalion, Gemunu Watch
- 542 Brigade
  - 25th Battalion, Sri Lanka Sinha Regiment
  - 15th Volunteer Battalion, Gemunu Watch
- 543 Brigade
  - 25th Battalion, Gemunu Watch
  - 19th Battalion, Vijayabahu Infantry Regiment
