= List of military operations of the Sri Lankan civil war =

After defeating the insurgency led by the Janatha Vimukthi Peramuna (JVP) in 1971, the Sri Lanka Armed Forces were confronted with a new conflict, this time with the Liberation Tigers of Tamil Eelam (LTTE) and other Tamil militant groups. The war escalated to the point where India was asked to intervene as a peacekeeping force. This was later seen as a tactical error, as the IPKF united nationalist elements such as the JVP to politically support the LTTE in their call to evict the IPKF. The war with the LTTE halted following the signing of a ceasefire agreement in 2002 with the help of international mediation. However, renewed violence broke out in December 2005 and following the collapse of peace talks, the army was once again involved in heavy fighting in the north and east of the country, until the LTTE's defeat in 2009.

From 1980 to 2009 the army had undertaken many operations against the LTTE rebels. The major operations conducted by the army eventually lead to the recapture of Jaffna and other rebel strongholds.

== Major combat operations of the Sri Lankan Army during the Sri Lankan Civil War ==
=== Eelam War I (1983–1987) ===
Operation Name	Date	Location	Purpose/Result
Vadamarachchi Operation	June 1987	Vadamarachchi	Partial Sri Lankan Army victory

=== IPKF intervention ===
Operation Name	Date	Location	Purpose/Result
JVP Uprising	1987–1990		Sri Lankan Government victory

=== Eelam War II (1990–1995) ===
Operation Name	Date	Location	Purpose/Result
Operation Thrividha Balaya	13 September 1990	Jaffna	Sri Lankan Army victory
Operation Balavegaya I, II	14 July – 9 August 1991	Jaffna	Sri Lankan Army victory
Operation Edibala (Mannar Vavuniya linking up operation)			

=== Eelam War III (1995–2002) ===
Operation Name	Date	Location	Purpose/Result
Operation Riviresa	17 November - 5 December 1995	Jaffna	Sri Lankan Army victory
Operation Unceasing Waves -1	1996 - 1997		Tamil Tiger victory
Operation Jayasikurui	13 May 1997 - 9 February 1999		Tamil Tiger victory
Operation Rivibala			
Operation Ranagosa	4 March - 12 May 1999		Sri Lankan Army victory
Operation Unceasing Waves -2	1998 - 1999		Tamil Tiger victory
Operation Unceasing Waves -3	1999 - 2000		Tamil Tiger victory
Operation Rivikirana			
Operation Kinihira I, II, III/IV, V/VI, VII, VIII, IX			

=== Eelam War IV (2006–2009) ===
==== Eastern Theatre ====
Operation Name	Date	Location	Purpose/Result
Operations in Thoppigala area	25 April - 11 July 2007		Sri Lankan Army victory

==== Northern Theatre ====
Operation Name	Date	Location	Purpose/Result
2008 SLA Northern offensive	January 2008 - 18 May 2009		Sri Lankan Army victory

== Major battles ==
The table below lists all major battles of the Sri Lankan Civil War. The information included in the table has been pieced together from the individual battle articles.

Battle	Date	Location	Deaths				Result
Battle	Date	Location	SLAF	LTTE	IPKF	Civilians	Result
Eelam War I (23 July 1983 – 29 July 1987)
Kokkilai Offensive	13 February 1985	SLA camp, Kokkilai, Mullaitivu District	4	14			SLA victory
Vadamarachchi Operation (a.k.a. Operation Liberation)	26 May – 4 June 1987	Vadamarachchi, Jaffna District	33	Unknown			Partial SLA victory, Operation Poomalai
Operation Poomalai	4 June 1987	Jaffna, Jaffna District					Indian intervention
Battle of Nelliady	5 July 1987	Nelliady, Jaffna District	19	3			Both SLA & LTTE claimed victory
Ceasefire (29 July – 11 October 1987)
Indian intervention in the Sri Lankan Civil War (11 October 1987 – 24 March 1990)
Operation Pawan	11–25 October 1987	Jaffna, Jaffna District		Unknown	214		LTTE victory
Operation Trishul	April 1988	Northern Province					
Operation Viraat	April 1988	Northern Province					LTTE victory
Operation Checkmate	June 1988	Vadamarachi, Jaffna District					IPKF victory
Jaffna University Helidrop	12 October 1987	University of Jaffna, Jaffna, Jaffna District			36		LTTE victory and widrawal of IPKF from Sri Lanka after defeated
Eelam War II (10 June 1990 – 9 January 1995)
Battle of Kokavil	27 June – 11 July 1990	SLA camp, Kokavil, Kilinochchi District	69				LTTE victory
Operation Sea Breeze	September 1990	SLA camp, Mullaitivu, Mullaitivu District					SLA victory
Operation Thrividha Balaya	13 September 1990	Jaffna, Jaffna District					SLA victory
Operation Balavegaya (a.k.a. Operation Power Force)	14 July – 9 August 1991	Jaffna, Jaffna District	202–400	573(according to LTTE)			SLA victory
Operation Sathbala							SLA victory
Operation Balavegaya II							SLA victory
First Battle of Elephant Pass	10 July – 9 August 1991	SLA camp, Elephant Pass, Kilinochchi District	600	600			SLA victory
Battle of Janakapura	25 July 1993	Janakapura, Weli Oya, Mullaitivu District	44	Unknown			LTTE victory
Battle of Pooneryn	11–14 November 1993	Pooneryn, Kilinochchi District	641	460			LTTE victory
Ceasefire (9 January – 19 April 1995)
Eelam War III (19 April 1995 – 22 February 2002)
Battle of Mandaitivu	28 June 1995	Mandaitivu, Jaffna District	~120	8–75			LTTE victory
Battle of Weli Oya	28 July 1995	Weli Oya, Mullaitivu District	2	330			SLA victory
Operation Riviresa / Battle of Jaffna	17 October – 5 December 1995	Jaffna, Jaffna District	500+	438			SLA victory
Battle of Mullaitivu (1996) (a.k.a. Operation Unceasing Waves)	18–25 July 1996	Mullaitivu, Mullaitivu District	1,242	332			LTTE victory
Operation Sath Jaya	26 July – 3 October 1996	Elephant Pass and Kilinochchi, Kilinochchi District	~500	121			SLA victory
Battle of Pulukunawa	11 December 1996	Police STF camp, Pulukunawa, Ampara District	48	35			LTTE victory
Battle of Vavunathivu	7 March 1997	SLA camp, Vavunathivu, Batticaloa District	75	103			LTTE victory
Operation Jayasikurui	13 May 1997 – 9 February 1999	Sri Lanka	3,566	2,146			LTTE victory
Thandikulam–Omanthai offensive	10–25 June 1997	Thandikulam & Omanthai, Vavuniya District	700	165			LTTE victory
Battle of Kilinochchi (1998) (a.k.a. Operation Unceasing Waves II)	27–29 September 1998	Kilinochchi, Kilinochchi District	1900+	520			LTTE victory
Operation Rana Gosa	4 March – 12 May 1999	Northern Province					SLA victory
Oddusuddan Offensive	October – 2 November 1999	Oddusuddan, Mullaitivu District	800				LTTE victory
Battle for the A-9 highway	27 March – 20 April 2000	A-9 Highway, Kilinochchi District	203	317		50	LTTE victory
Second Battle of Elephant Pass (a.k.a. Operation Unceasing Waves III)	22–23 April 2000	SLA camp, Elephant Pass, Kilinochchi District	1000+	150			LTTE victory
Bandaranaike Airport attack	24 July 2001	Bandaranaike International Airport, Katunayake, Gampaha District	7	14			Successful LTTE raid
Ceasefire (22 February 2002 – 26 July 2006)
Battle of Point Pedro (2006)	12 May 2006	Bay of Bengal near Point Pedro, Jaffna District	17	54			SLN victory
Eelam War IV (26 July 2006 – 18 May 2009)
Battle of Jaffna	11 August – 29 October 2006	Jaffna Peninsula, Jaffna District	1000+	372(LTTE confirmed)			Stalemate
Battle of Sampur	28 August – 4 September 2006	Sampur, Trincomalee District	33	200			SLA victory
Attack on Galle Harbour	18 October 2006	Galle, Galle District	1	9		1	Disputed
Battle of Thoppigala	25 April – 11 July 2007	Kudumbimalai, Batticaloa District	48	85 killed and 3 suicides			SLA victory
Battle of Point Pedro (2007)	19 June 2007	Bay of Bengal near Point Pedro, Jaffna District		unknown			SLN victory
Raid on Anuradhapura Air Force Base	22 October 2007	SLAF Base Anuradhapura, Anuradhapura, Anuradhapura District	14	20			Successful LTTE raid
Battle of Delft	25 December 2007	Palk Strait near Neduntheevu (Delft) island, Jaffna District		4(LTTE Claimed)			Disputed
Battle of Vidattaltivu	16 July 2008	Vidattaltivu, Mannar District	1	unknown			SLA victory
2008–2009 Battle of Kilinochchi	23 November 2008 – 2 January 2009	Kilinochchi, Kilinochchi District					SLA victory
Battle of Mullaitivu (2009)	2–25 January 2009	Mullaitivu, Mullaitivu District					SLA victory
Third Battle of Elephant Pass	9 January 2009	Elephant Pass, Kilinochchi District					SLA victory
Battle of Chalai	2–6 February 2009	Chalai, Mullaitivu District		12			SLA victory
Battle of Aanandapuram	29 March – 5 April 2009	Ananthapuram, Mullaitivu District		Unknown			SLA victory
Battle of Puthukkudiyirippu	2–5 April 2009	Puthukkudiyirippu, Mullaitivu District		Unknown			SLA victory
Truce (13–15 April 2009)
Final Battle of the Sri Lankan Civil War	7–19 May 2009	Puthukkudiyirippu, Mullaitivu District					SLA victory
Government of Sri Lanka declares victory and end of the war (19 May 2009)
