= Battle of Puthukkudiyirippu =

Battle during the Sri Lankan Civil War

- Part of Sri Lankan Civil War, 2008–2009 SLA Northern offensive
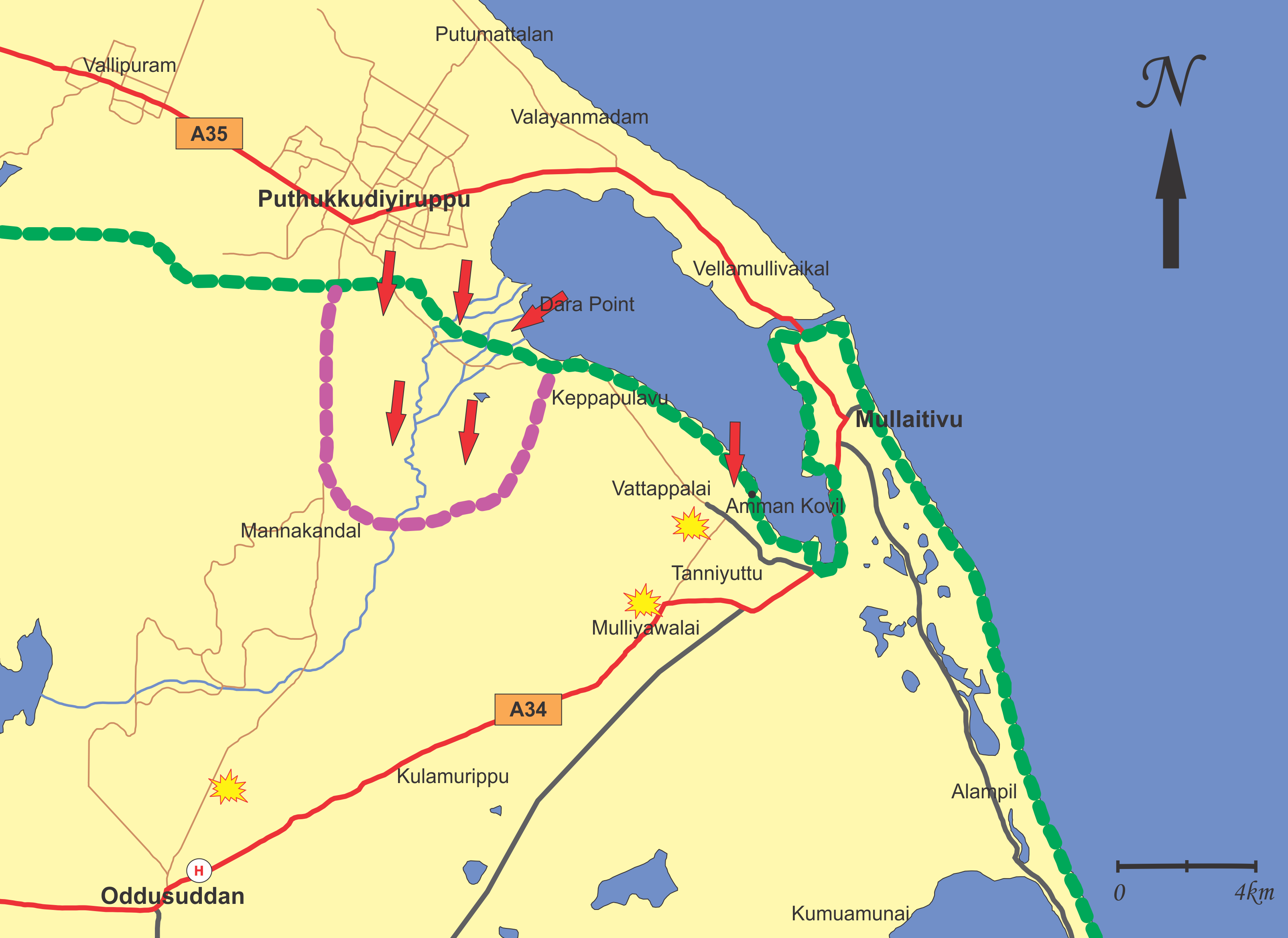
- Map of Mullaitivu front depicting events of the Battle of Puthukkudiyiruppu (February 2009)
| Date | April 2–5, 2009 |
| Location | Puthukkudiyirippu, Sri Lanka |
| Result | Sri Lankan government victory |
| Territorial changes | Puthukkudiyirippu stronghold regained by the Government of Sri Lanka |

Belligerents
| Sri Lanka | Liberation Tigers of Tamil Eelam |

Commanders and leaders
| Lt. Gen Sarath Fonseka: Brig Shavendra Silva; Maj. Gen Kamal Gunaratne; Col G.V. Ravipriya | Velupillai Prabhakaran: Pottu Amman; Colonel Theepan †; Colonel Bhanu; Vidusha †; Durga † |

Units involved
| Sri Lanka Armed Forces; Sri Lanka Army; 58 Division; 53 Division; Task Force 8 | Liberation Tigers of Tamil Eelam |

Strength
| Unknown | Unknown |

Casualties and losses
| Low | High |

The Battle Of Puthukkudiyirippu was a land battle fought between the Sri Lankan Military, 58 Division, 53 Division and Task Force 8 and the Liberation Tigers of Tamil Eelam (LTTE) for the control of the last stronghold held by the LTTE. This battle is a part of the Northern Theatre of Eelam War IV during the Sri Lankan civil war.

== Battle ==
The Battle of Puthukkudiyirippu was an armed confrontation over control over the AGA division of Puthukkudiyirippu in Sri Lanka between the 55, 58th and 53rd Division of the Sri Lankan Military and the Liberation Tigers of Tamil Eelam (LTTE) during the Sri Lankan civil war, fought from the first months of 2009 till the end of April 2009. Puthukkudiyirippu was the final LTTE base held by the LTTE during the Northern Theatre of Eelam War IV.

The battle of Puthukkudiyirippu was different from other battles because the area was an urban terrain. Both parties adopted hit and run strategies until a decisive battle was fought in Anandapuram junction where more than 600 LTTE carders and an array of top leaders were killed in five days. A major tiger offensive was met with a counter offensive, outflanking and encircling an entire division of LTTE in an area of 2 square kilometers.

== Senior LTTE cadres killed in action ==
LTTE lost all their best fighters they ever had in one single battle.

- Theepan - Theepan was LTTE's de facto deputy military chief.
- Ruben Ragavan
- Nagesh
- Gadaphi (former body guard of Prabakaran)
- Vidusha ('Malathi' female wing head)
- Durga ('Soothiya' female wing head)
- Kamalini

== See also ==
- List of Sri Lankan civil war battles
- Battle of Mullaitivu (2009)
