= Puthukkudiyiruppu =

Puthukkudiyiruppu may refer to:

- Puthukkudiyiruppu (Mullaitivu), town in Mullaitivu District, Sri Lanka
- Puthukkudiyiruppu (Batticaloa), town in Batticaloa District, Sri Lanka

== See also ==
- Puthukkudiyirippu (disambiguation)
