= Battle of Jaffna (2006) =

2006 battle of the Sri Lankan civil war

- Part of the Sri Lankan civil war
Date	August 11 – October 29, 2006
Location	Jaffna, Sri Lanka
Result	Stalemate

Belligerents
Sri Lanka	Liberation Tigers of Tamil Eelam

Commanders and leaders
Maj. Gen Kamal Gunaratne	Brigadier Theepan

Units involved
Sri Lanka Armed Forces; Sri Lanka Army; 53 Division; Air Mobile Brigade; 55 Division	Liberation Tigers of Tamil Eelam; Charles Anthony Brigade; Jeyanthan Brigade

Strength
40,000 soldiers	3,000 fighters

Casualties and losses
300+ killed 800+ wounded (SLA claim); 1,000+ killed (LTTE claim)	900 killed (SLA claim); 372 confirmed killed (LTTE claim)

The Battle of Jaffna was fought in two phases in August and October 2006 for the Jaffna Peninsula. It was the fourth battle for the peninsula since the start of the Sri Lankan civil war.

== Build-up ==
With the peace talks breaking down in early 2006 between the Government and the LTTE, both parties were now preparing for the recommencement of hostilities. On May 25, the LTTE suffered a setback when their OIC of the Nagarkovil Forward Defence Line and former commander of the Charles Anthony Brigade, Lt. Col. Veeramani, was killed in an accidental explosion. A few days before his death, Veeramani complained that the SLA troopers were provoking LTTE fighters by hurling stones and firing shots towards their positions.

== Battle ==
=== Tamil Tiger offensive ===
On August 11, 2006, fighting was renewed for control of the Jaffna Peninsula, after six years of a World War One-like stalemate position. The mainland Jaffna Peninsula had been cut off by land from the rest of Sri Lanka after the Tigers (LTTE) overran the Elephant Pass base in early 2000. The only way the peninsula received supplies and fresh troops was by sea or air.

The LTTE Launched a preemptive attack on the Main SLN base (China Bay) in Trincomalee. The objective of the attack was to capture the naval base for at least couple of weeks and thereby cut off the supplies for the 40,000 troops in the Jaffna peninsula. The major offensive against the Trincomalee Harbor was met with immediate resistance forcing tigers to retreat with heavy casualties after days of fighting. Even though the offensive failed the Tigers launched a massive ground attack on the forward defense lines in Muhmalai and Nargakovil.

Initially the Tigers broke through SLA positions and advanced north towards Jaffna, but after 10 hours of fierce fighting they were beaten back and returned to their original positions. The Sri Lankan government claimed that up to 700 rebels and 150 soldiers were killed in only 5 days of fighting by August 16, claiming that another 300 soldiers were wounded.

The LTTE continued to wage multiple smaller scale offensives with their troops from the Charles Antony Brigade and Jeyanthan Brigade actively attacking the SLA lines, but they were beaten back after suffering heavy casualties. By the end of the week the Tigers stationed themselves in their previous defence lines. Small skirmishes continued to occur between both sides during the next couple of months. During that time, the LTTE suffered another setback when the commander of the Victor Anti-Tank Unit, Lt.Col Akbar, was killed by random SLA shelling on October 7 while inspecting the forward defence lines at Muhamalai.

=== SLA offensive ===
On October 11, the 53rd and 55th divisions launched a joint frontal assault towards the LTTE's first line of defense. SLA troops advanced only a few hundred meters into "No Man's Land" when they were hit by heavy machine gun and RPG fire. The next day the SLA offensive was broken. It resulted in the biggest loss of life and equipment for the military in four years with 129 soldiers killed and 519 wounded with six armoured vehicles, four T-55 tanks and two BMPs either destroyed or damaged. The Tigers also seized 16 Multi Purpose Machine Guns (MPMGs), 4 Rocket Propelled Grenade Launchers (RPGs), a Grenade Launcher, a lite anti-tank weapon, 98 assault rifles and large amounts of ammunition from the Gemunu Watch soldiers. Most of the dead troopers from both divisions belonged to the Gemunu Watch regiment of the SLA. The rebels claimed that they lost only 22 fighters, while the army said that they killed 400, nevertheless, the army suffered a setback. During this time the army accused the Tigers of massacring 74 soldiers from a unit that was surrounded and captured. The Tigers denied it.

== Aftermath ==
Whatever the number of dead and wounded neither side gained any ground and both sides were back where they started from by the end of the battle. In all, the government of Sri Lanka claimed that 700-1,000 LTTE fighters were reported killed along with more than 300 soldiers in the period from August 11 to October 29.

== See also ==
- Battle of Jaffna (1995)
- List of Sri Lankan Civil War battles
