= Battle of Jaffna =

Battle of Jaffna may refer to battles of the Sri Lankan Civil War:

- Battle of Jaffna (1995)
- Battle of Jaffna (2006)
