= Battle of Nelliady =

Battle in July 1987 during the Sri Lankan civil war

- Part of Eelam War I and the Sri Lankan Civil War
Date	5 July 1987
Location	Nelliady, Jaffna District, Sri Lanka 9°48′12.20″N 80°12′10.70″E
Result	LTTE tactical victory SLA strategic victory

Belligerents
Sri Lanka	Liberation Tigers of Tamil Eelam

Commanders and leaders
Gen Cyril Ranatunga	V. Prabhakaran

Units involved
Sri Lanka Armed Forces; Sri Lanka Army; Sri Lanka Armoured Corps; Gemunu Watch	Liberation Tigers of Tamil Eelam; Black Tigers

Strength
~150 troops	~50 militants

Casualties and losses
19 killed 31 wounded	1 killed 2 suicide bombers detonated
- Location of base in Northern Province, Sri Lanka

The Battle of Nelliady took place during the early stages of the Sri Lankan Civil War. It occurred on 5 July 1987, when a force of 50 LTTE militants assaulted the Sri Lanka Army Camp located in the Nelliady Central College in the town of Nelliady in the Jaffna District in northern Sri Lanka. The attack was the bloodiest battle for the Sri Lankan forces since the Vadamarachchi Operation in June 1987, which cleared the area of Nelliady of LTTE militants. The attack on Nelliady army camp resulted in the Sri Lankan forces suffering 19 killed and 31 wounded, while LTTE executed its first suicide bombing which was carried out by Captain Miller.

== Background ==
With the escalation of the Sri Lankan Civil War, the Sri Lankan armed forces launched the Vadamarachchi Operation in June 1987 to encircle and destroy the LTTE leadership and militants in the Jaffna Peninsula. LTTE had responded in the Eastern province with the Aranthalawa massacre. The offensive was stopped before completing its objectives with the intervention of India after it launched Operation Poomalai violating the territorial sovereignty Sri Lanka and pressured the Government of Sri Lanka to call off the offensive. The township of Nelliady was cleared of militants during the offensive and the Sri Lanka Army established a camp at the Nelliady Central College. Following the end of the Vadamarachchi Operation, the LTTE which had received a consignment of explosives from the Indian Research and Analysis Wing carried out several retaliatory attacks on the army, including detonating a landmine targeting an army truck carrying released detainees which killed the seven detainees and three soldiers as well as attacking the Telecommunications Department building in the Jaffna town with an improvised armoured truck laden with explosives. Part of the building collapsed following the explosion and a group of 50 militants attacked the defenders capturing three soldiers and several weapons.

Having captured Nelliady in the early days of the Vadamarachchi Operation, about 100 soldiers from the Gemunu Watch were stationed at the Nelliady camp and supported by an armoured reconnaissance troop from the Sri Lanka Armoured Corps equipped with an Alvis Saladin armoured car and two Ferret scout cars.

== Attack ==
The soldiers at the Nelliady camp were relaxed as they believed that the area had been cleared of militants. Shortly after 8 pm, the camp came under intense mortar and rocket attack, with the militants who had moved into several abandoned buildings next to the camp and were using it as cover for the attack. The main thrust of the attack was launched along the road leading to the camp in the form of two explosive laden trucks. After clearing the roadblocks with rockets and rifle grenades, the trucks were driven at speed to the camp. One truck overturned and exploded, while the other driven by Miller hit the school and exploded destroying part of the school building and trapping many of the soldiers in the rubble. Several militants entered the camp and pressed the attack, with the soldiers offering stiff resistance. A sergeant and driver mounted the Saladin armoured car, but before they could bring its 76 mm gun to bear, an RPG penetrated the vehicle through the driver's viewing portal incinerating the sergeant, the driver, and knocking out the Saladin. The firefight went on for several hours as army reinforcements were delayed. An attempt to land reinforcements by helicopters failed due to heavy gun fire and reinforcements by road ran into a freshly laid mine field. With reinforcements arriving the militants retreated. While the troops cleared the rubble looking for bodies, the attack restarted with mortars and small arms fire.

== Aftermath ==
The army officially claimed that it suffered 19 killed and 31 wounded in the attack. The LTTE claimed it lost 3 militants, including 2 suicide bombers, and captured small arms, ammunition and a mortar launcher and killed up to 39-100 soldiers. Prabhakaran named Miller, Captain Miller and he was celebrated by the LTTE as the first Black Tiger (suicide bomber) with 5 July celebrated each year by the LTTE with remembrances and major attacks. A few days later the militants fired mortars at Nelliady again, wounding ten more soldiers. On 11 July the army launched "Operation Clean Sweep" to flush out militants in the Vadamarachchi area in which it claimed to have killed 18 militants for the lose of 3 soldiers. On 29 July 1987 the Indo-Sri Lanka Accord was signed and on 30 July the lead elements of the 54th Infantry Division of the Indian Army landed in Sri Lanka as part of what was to be the Indian Peace Keeping Force.

== See also ==
- List of Sri Lankan Civil War battles
- Aranthalawa massacre
