= Brigadier Vithusha =

Sri Lankan Tamil rebel

- Born: Kappoothu, Vadamaradchi, Sri Lanka
- Died: April 2009
- Organization: Liberation Tigers of Tamil Eelam
- Military service
- Allegiance: Tamil Eelam
- Branch: Liberation Tigers of Tamil Eelam
- Service years: 1985 –2009
- Commands: Head of Malathi Brigade, Commander of LTTE's Women's Wing
- Conflicts: Sri Lankan Civil War: Eelam War I, between 1985 and 1987; Indian intervention in the Sri Lankan Civil War, between 1987 and 1990; Eelam War II, between 1990 and 1995; Eelam War III, between 1995 and 2002; Eelam War IV, between 2006 and 2009

Vithusha also spelt as Vidusha commonly known by the nom de guerre Brigadier Vithusha was a Sri Lankan Tamil rebel and member of the Liberation Tigers of Tamil Eelam (LTTE), a separatist Tamil militant organisation in Sri Lanka. She joined the LTTE after being deeply affected by the massacre of Tamils in the Kumudini boat massacre in 1985. She came from a Tamil Brahmin family, her brother Vithushan died in combat during battle with the Sri Lankan Army in Vilakkuvaithakulam in Vavuniya District in 1999. She received her training near Kilili as part of the Freedom Birds training program. She was in charge of stores during the IPKF operations. She got into combat and fought in an attack on the Jaffna Fort and she played a significant role in every military operation in which the women's brigade was involved. She was killed in combat in the Battle of Puthukkudiyirippu in 2009.
