= Eelam War I =

Initial phase of the Sri Lankan Civil War, from 1983 to 1987

- Part of the Sri Lankan Civil War
Date	23 July 1983 – 29 July 1987 (4 years and 6 days)
Location	Sri Lanka
Result	Peace deal negotiated by India, and arrival of Indian peacekeepers

Belligerents
Sri Lanka	Liberation Tigers of Tamil Eelam

Commanders and leaders
(Sri Lanka) J.R. Jayewardene; Lt. Gen T. I. Weerathunga; Lt. Gen Nalin Seneviratne	Velupillai Prabhakaran

Units involved
Sri Lanka Armed Forces: Sri Lanka Army	Liberation Tigers of Tamil Eelam

Eelam War I (23 July 1983 – 29 July 1987) is the name given to the initial phase of the Sri Lankan civil war between the government of Sri Lanka and the LTTE.

== Prelude ==
Tensions between the government and Tamil militant groups had been brewing since the 1970s. The 1971 JVP insurrection led the government to conduct an extensive counter insurgency to subdue a Marxist youth insurgency, and to the imprisonment of many that were captured through the Criminal Justice Commission. In the early 1970s several Tamil youth militant groups such as Tamil Eelam Liberation Organization (TELO), Tamil Manavar Peravai, Tamil New Tigers (TNT) and Eelam Revolutionary Organisation of Students (EROS). Alfred Duraiappah was Mayor of Jaffna and chief organiser in Jaffna District of the Sri Lanka Freedom Party (SLFP), the ruling party in Colombo. He became the target of these militants. A first attempt on his life was made in 1971 in a bomb attack and in the second attempt on 27 July 1975 he was shot dead. The police team investigating the murder was massacred in Murunkan, by the Liberation Tigers of Tamil Eelam (LTTE) who claimed responsibility for massacre and the assassination in late April.

1979 saw the killings of Tamil policemen in Jaffna by militants and the establishment of the Tamil Coordinating Committee in London, intended to further the cause of Tamil Eelam with the aid of the Tamil diaspora. The Committee gained the support of the Gandhi family and recognition in the United States, such that the Massachusetts community celebrated Tamil Eelam Day on 22 May 1979. The British Government responded to requests by the Sri Lankan President to send MI5 Director John Percival Morton to advise the Sri Lankan Government. Morton assisted in the formation of the Sri Lanka Commando Regiment with training from the Special Air Service.

Meanwhile, new rebel groups began forming such as Eelam People's Revolutionary Liberation Front (EPRLF) and Eelam Revolutionary Organisation of Students (EROS) began arming and military training in 1980. The Sri Lankan government responded with the Prevention of Terrorism Act and a counter insurgency operation in Jaffna to establish normalcy by hunting down the militants, who fled to India, bringing a degree of calm. In 1980 the People's Liberation Organisation of Tamil Eelam (PLOTE) was formed following a falling out within the LTTE leadership. Fighting restarted following the PLOTE attack on the Annaicoddia police station in July 1981, killing a police officer. It became the first instance of an attack on a police station, leading to rioting in Rathanapura. In October the LTTE, in the first time targeting the army, killed two soldiers in Jaffna. Killing continued along with bank robberies, while fighting between PLOTE and LTTE broke out, including a shootout in the Pondy Bazaar Madras in May 1982, resulting in the imprisonment of the LTTE founder Velupillai Prabhakaran. 1982 saw more attacks and bank robberies, use of landmines became common. Chavakachcheri police station came under attack and in February 1983 Point Pedro OIC was besieged. In May 1983, local government elections were stained by election boycotts, candidate killings, and attacks on polling stations.

== Eelam war 1 starts ==
Full-scale war did not break out until an attack by the LTTE on a Sri Lanka Army patrol in Jaffna, in the north of the country, on 23 July 1983, which killed 13 soldiers. The attack, and the subsequent riots in the south (dubbed Black July), are generally considered the start of the conflict.

=== Black July ===
On 24 July 1983, the day the 13 servicemen killed in an LTTE ambush were to be buried, some Sinhalese civilians who had gathered at the cemetery, angered by news of the ambush, which was magnified by wild rumor, formed mobs and started killing, raping, and assaulting Tamils while looting and burning their properties in retribution for what happened. Sinhalese civilians were equipped with voter registration lists, burning and attacking only Tamil residences and business, while army and government officials stood by. Even Sinhalese civilians who harbored Tamil families in their households (or suspected of doing so) were set upon by the mobs.

== Militants take over ==
In August 1983, the Sixth Amendment to the Constitution of Sri Lanka was passed, requiring all members to swear an oath unconditionally renouncing support for a separate state. The leader of the opposition, A. Amirthalingam, and other TULF members boycotted Parliament, losing their seats and fleeing to Madras, creating a power vacuum on the island which was soon filled by young militants, who after a lull resumed their ambush attacks and bank robberies in 1984. On 2 August, the Tamil Eelam Army (TEA) carried out a bomb blast at the Meenambakkam Air Port in Madras, killing 33 people. On 19 November 1984, the northern commander, Colonel Ariyasinghe Ariyapperuma, was killed along with eight soldiers when his jeep was hit by a landmine explosion in an ambush set for him by the LTTE. The next day, TELO launched an attack on the Chavakachcheri Police Station, killing all its staff and razing the buildings to the ground. Increased landmine attacks on army units resulted in the army purchasing South African Buffels.

=== Kent and Dollar Farm massacres ===
In November 1984, Sinhalese convicts were settled in the Kent and Dollar farms after the Tamil civilians living there were evicted by the Sri Lankan Army. The settlement of prisoners was used to further harass Tamils into leaving the area. The Sinhala settlers confirmed that young Tamil women were abducted, brought there and gang-raped, first by the forces, next by prison guards and finally by prisoners.

Following this settlement, the LTTE committed their first massacre of Sinhalese civilians. The massacres took place on November 30, 1984, in two tiny farming villages in the district of Mullaitivu in north-eastern Sri Lanka.

== Rebel offensives ==
The LTTE attacked SLA encampment in Kokkilai, Mullaitivu District, Sri Lanka, on the night of 13 February 1985. In May, EPRLF made an unsuccessful attack on the Karainagar naval base with an armour plated bulldozer, losing 22 carders.

=== Anuradhapura massacre ===
The Anuradhapura massacre is an incident on May 14, 1985, in which LTTE cadres massacred 146 Sinhalese men, women, and children in Anuradhapura. The LTTE hijacked a bus and entered Anuradhapura. As the LTTE cadres entered the main bus station, they opened fire indiscriminately with automatic weapons killing and wounding many civilians who were waiting for buses. LTTE cadres then drove to the Buddhist Sri Maha Bobhi shrine and gunned down nuns, monks and civilians as they prayed inside the Buddhist shrine. Before they withdrew, the LTTE strike force entered the national park of Wilpattu and killed 18 Sinhalese in the forest reserve. The attack was allegedly sparked by the 1985 Valvettiturai massacre, where the Sri Lanka Army massacred 70 Tamil civilians in the LTTE's leader hometown.

== Peace talks ==
Fighting continued until 1985 when peace talks were held between the two sides in Thimphu, Bhutan in hopes of seeking a negotiated settlement. The peace talks proved as fruitless and fighting soon resumed.

== Purge of TELO ==
Attacks intensified in 1986, with an attack by TELO on the Anuradhpura oil storage facility in April, which was followed by fighting between TELO and the LTTE in Nallur, resulting in TELO being whipped out and its leader Sri Sabaratnam killed. Following the purge the LTTE began to dominate parts of the Jaffna peninsula. LTTE also carried out in Colombo with the bombing of Air Lanka Flight 512 and carried out attacks on army detachments. On May 17, 1986, the Sri Lankan military launched an offensive to take control of the Jaffna Peninsula but was met with fierce resistance from the LTTE which forced the Sri Lankan Army to withdraw after three days of intense fighting. Thereafter, the Sri Lankan military strategy shifted to mortar shelling and aerial bombing which drove the Tamil population out of the eastern coast of the Jaffna Peninsula.

=== Prawn farm massacre ===
The Prawn farm massacre, also known as the 1987 Kokkadichcholai massacre, took place on January 27, 1987 in the village of Kokkadichcholai in Batticaloa District. At least 83 Tamil civilians were killed. The Special Task Force (STF), an elite special forces unit of the Sri Lanka Police, was accused of having perpetrated the massacre. The STF entered the village from Vellaveli, Kondavedduvan, Kaluvanchikudi and Kallandy camps in trucks. At a nearby junction, a vehicle was parked and some STF officers exited the vehicle and walked into the prawn farm. The STF gathered up the farm employees, checked their identity cards and herded them onto a semi-trailer; they were taken to a road junction and shot dead. Seven of the victims were boys aged 12 to 14. Forty non-employees who had sought refuge in the farm were also shot and killed. The bodies were later burnt on piles of old tires obtained by the security forces from the town's bus depot.

== Vadamarachchi Operation ==
In 1987, the Vadamarachchi Operation of the Sri Lankan military had cornered the LTTE in Jaffna, on the tip of the island, and were confident of bringing an end to the conflict. However, due to internal pressure, specifically concern about the 50 million Tamils living in India, the Indian government called for a halt to the offensive. After the request was snubbed by Sri Lanka, the Indian Prime Minister Rajiv Gandhi ordered a flotilla of ships be sent to relieve the economic embargo imposed on the population in Jaffna. After the convoy was blocked by the Sri Lanka Navy, India instead chose to airdrop supplies to the besieged city in a mission codenamed Operation Poomalai.

=== First suicide bombing ===
The battle of Nelliady occurred on 5 July 1987, when a force of 50 LTTE militants assaulted the Sri Lanka Army Camp located in the Nelliady Central College in the town of Nelliady in the Jaffna District in northern Sri Lanka. The attack was the bloodiest battle for the Sri Lankan forces since the Vadamarachchi Operation in June 1987, which cleared the area of Nelliady of LTTE militants. The attack on Nelliady army camp resulted in the Sri Lankan forces suffering 19 killed and 31 wounded. At Nelliady LTTE launched its first suicide attack with a truck bombing. On 5 July 1987, a suicide bomber Captain Miller drove a truck loaded with explosives and rammed the truck into the army camp at Nelliady Madhya Maha Vidyalayam. At least 40 Sri Lankan army were killed in that incident.

== Indian involvement in Sri Lanka ==
Following the successful completion of the mission, and faced with the possibility of further involvement of the Indian military, including reports that Indian ground forces were being prepared for possible involvement in Sri Lanka, Sri Lanka President J. R. Jayewardene held talks with the Indian government to resolve the dispute. As a result of the negotiations, the siege of Jaffna was lifted and the Indo-Sri-Lankan Peace Accord was signed on July 29, 1987. Sri Lankan troops then withdraw from the north of the country and handed over control over the entire area to Indian peacekeeping troops named the Indian Peace Keeping Force. This brought about an end to the first stage of the ethnic conflict.

== See also ==
- Origins of the Sri Lankan Civil War
- Phases of the Sri Lankan Civil War
- Eelam War II
- Eelam War III
- Eelam War IV
- List of Sri Lankan Civil War battles
- List of attacks attributed to the LTTE
- Sri Lankan Civil War
