= Elephant Pass railway station =

Railway station in Elephant Pass, Sri Lanka

Elephant Pass railway station ஆனையிறவு අලිමංකඩ දුම්රිය ස්ථානය

General information
- Location: Elephant Pass; Sri Lanka
- Coordinates: 9°31′53.10″N 80°23′59.20″E
- System: Sri Lankan Railway Station
- Owner: Sri Lanka Railways
- Line: Northern Line

Other information
- Status: Functioning

History
- Rebuilt: 4 March 2014

Services
| Preceding station | Sri Lanka Railways | Following station |
|---|---|---|
| Paranthan toward Colombo Fort | Yarl Devi; Northern Line | Pallai toward Kankesanthurai |
Location

Elephant Pass railway station (Tamil: ஆனையிறவு தொடருந்து நிலையம் Āṉaiyiṟavu toṭaruntu nilaiyam) (Sinhala: අලිමංකඩ අඛණ්ඩ දුම්රිය ස්ථානය) is a railway station at Elephant Pass in northern Sri Lanka. Owned by Sri Lanka Railways, the state-owned railway operator, the station is part of the Northern Line which links the north with the capital Colombo. The popular Yarl Devi service calls at the station. The station was not functioning between 1990 and 2014 due to the civil war. The Northern Line between Kilinochchi and Pallai, which includes Elephant Pass, was re-opened on 4 March 2014.
