= Operation Rana Gosa =

- Part of Sri Lankan civil war
Date	4 March – 12 May 1999 (2 months and 8 days)
Location	Northern Province, Sri Lanka
Result	Sri Lankan Army victory
Territorial changes	535 square kilometres of territory re-captured.

Belligerents
Sri Lanka Army	Liberation Tigers of Tamil Eelam

Commanders and leaders
Lt. Gen. Srilal Weerasooriya	Velupillai Prabhakaran

Operation Rana Gosa, (battle cry in Sinhala) was an operation fought during the Sri Lankan Civil War as part of Eelam War III launched on 4 March 1999. The Operation resulted in the Sri Lankan Army re-capturing of 535 square kilometres of territory previously occupied by the LTTE.

== See also ==
- List of Sri Lankan Civil War battles
