= Kochera =

Village in Kerala, India

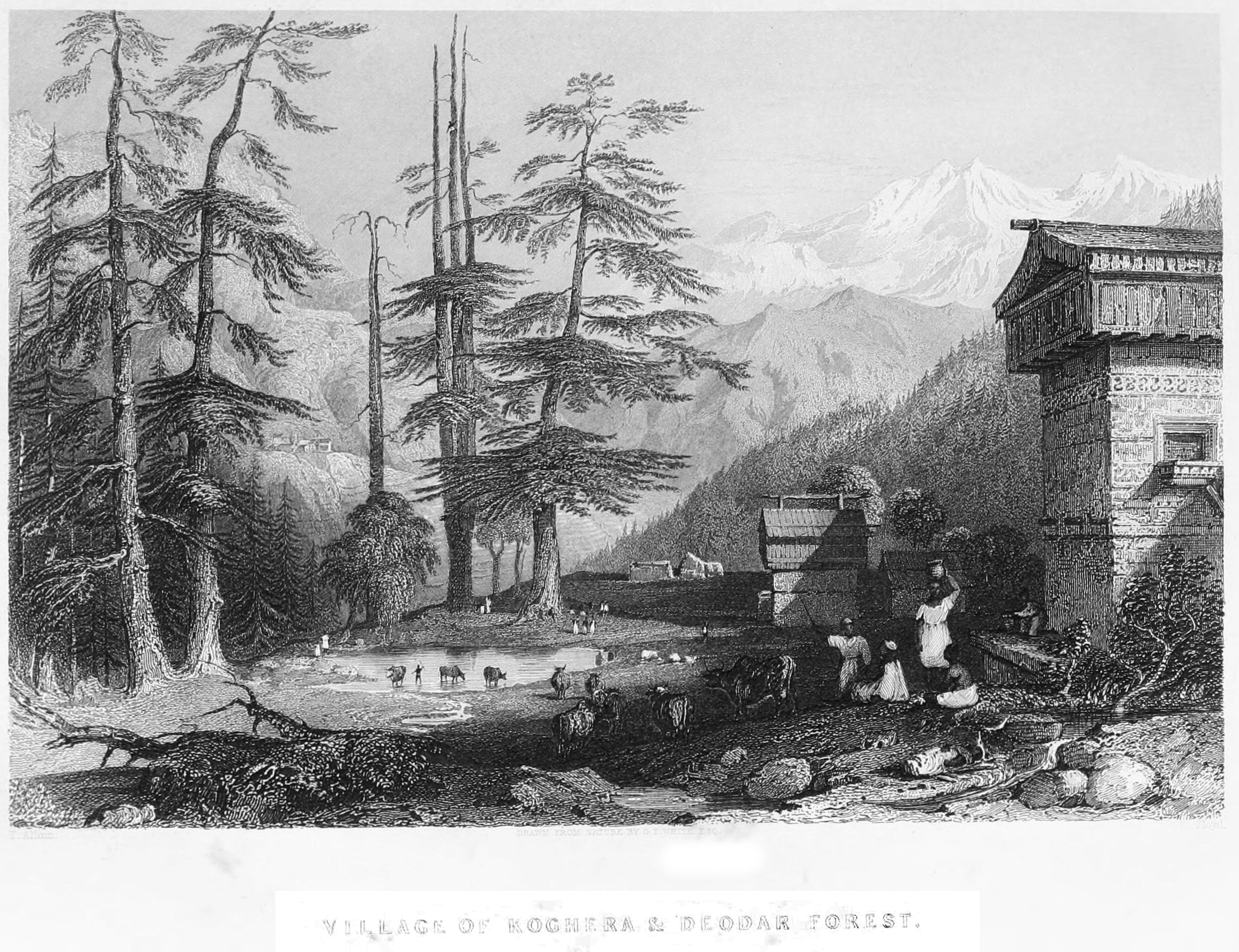
Kochera village

Kochera is a village in Idukki district, in the state of Kerala in India. Kochera is also known as Nettithozhu. It is located 18 km east of Kattappana, and borders Tamil Nadu. It is a farm-based area – popular crops being spices and rice.

== History ==
People came to this place as immigrants from various parts of Kerala, especially Kottayam, Pala and Alapuzha.

== Education ==
Schools at Kochera offer education up to Upper Primary level, both in English and Malayalam medium. Major Schools are St. Joseph L.P School, A.K.M U.P School, M.G.M English Medium School and Seventh day adventist school.

== Medical Facility ==
Idukki mission hospital is the main hospital in this area.

== In Literature ==
Letitia Elizabeth Landon's poem Village of Koghera., published in Fisher's Drawing Room Scrap Book, 1839, comments on the village's sequestered location and the rich variety of trees in the surrounding forests.
