= Elephant Pass Military Base =

Coordinates: 9°32′50″N 80°24′32″E

- Elephant Pass, Northern Province

Site information
- Type: Military base
- Controlled by: Sri Lanka Army

Site history
- In use: 19?? – 2000 and 2008 – present
- Battles/wars: First Battle of Elephant Pass, Second Battle of Elephant Pass, Third Battle of Elephant Pass

Garrison information
- Past commanders: Major General Sanath Karunaratne, Major General Percy P. Fernando
- Garrison: 55 Division

Elephant Pass Military Base is a military base located in strategic Elephant Pass, Northern Province of Sri Lanka. Elephant Pass is the gateway of the Jaffna Peninsula, which connects it to the mainland.

As far back as 1760 the Portuguese built a fort, which was later rebuilt and garrisoned by the Dutch in 1776 and later by the British. After independence in 1948 the newly formed Ceylon Army built a base. This base was expanded, and troops garrisoning it increased during the 1980s with the outset of LTTE liberation fighters activity in Jaffna Peninsula and the start of the Sri Lankan Civil War. By 1990 it was garrisoned by a full battalion with support units. By July the 6th battalion of the Sri Lanka Sinha Regiment was stationed. That month the First Battle of Elephant Pass took place for the control of the base and the area around it. The garrison held out until the siege was broken by Operation Balavegaya. By 2000 the base was home to the 54 Division of the Sri Lanka Army. That year the Second Battle of Elephant Pass was fought, in which the army was forced to withdraw from the base. Before the troops withdrew they destroyed much of the base, including its communication tower, to prevent it from falling into enemy hands. The LTTE occupied the area, fortifying it. The Sri Lankan Army recaptured the Elephant Pass in late 2008, in the Third Battle of Elephant Pass. It has reestablished its base and is home to the 55 Division.
