= Battle of Chalai =

Battle during the Sri Lankan civil war

- Part of Sri Lankan Civil War, 2008–2009 SLA Northern offensive
| Date | February 2–6, 2009 |
| Location | Chalai, North of Mullaitivu |
| Result | Sri Lankan Army victory |
| Territorial changes | LTTE-controlled area decreased to 200 square kilometers |

Belligerents
| Sri Lanka | Liberation Tigers of Tamil Eelam |

Commanders and leaders
| Lt. Gen Sarath Fonseka: Maj. Gen. Jagath Jayasuriya, Brig. Prasanna Silva | Velupillai Prabhakaran; Vinayagam † |

Units involved
| Sri Lanka Armed Forces: Sri Lanka Army; 55 Division | Unknown |

Strength
| Unknown | Unknown |

Casualties and losses
| Unknown | 12 killed |

The Battle of Chalai was an armed confrontation over control of Chalai, Sri Lanka between the 55 Division of the Sri Lankan Military and the Liberation Tigers of Tamil Eelam (LTTE) during the Sri Lankan civil war, fought in February 2009. Chalai was the final Sea Tiger base held by the LTTE during the Northern Theatre of Eelam War IV. Fighting lasted for five days, following which the 55 Division took control of the area. During the engagement, one soldier was wounded when a bomb carried by a child between 13 and 16 years of age exploded. The Sri Lankan Army indicates this suicide bomber was sent by the LTTE. Witnesses describe the boy behaving as though he had been "drugged or severely harassed before the mission."

== See also ==
- List of Sri Lankan Civil War battles
