= Battle for the A-9 highway =

2000 battle of the Sri Lankan civil war

- Part of the Sri Lankan civil war Operation Unceasing Waves III
Date	March 27, 2000 – April 20, 2000
Location	Sri Lanka
Result	Tamil Tiger victory

Belligerents
Sri Lanka	Liberation Tigers of Tamil Eelam

Commanders and leaders
Unknown	Velupillai Prabhakaran

Casualties and losses
203 killed 1,067 wounded	317 killed
- 50 civilians killed

The Battle for the A-9 highway was fought in March and April 2000 for the control of the Sri Lankan A-9 highway.

== Background ==
The A9 Highway is a 321-kilometer-long (199 mi) highway in Sri Lanka, which connects the central city of Kandy with Jaffna. It also the route between the Sri Lankan capital with the northern Jaffna Peninsula. More importantly, the Elephant Pass military base, was the only land route for Jaffna at that time. If the LTTE were going to fully surround Elephant Pass they would have to take the north–south highway.

== Battle ==
On March 27, the LTTE attacked the north–south highway. At first they attacked a coastal army base with a combined land and amphibious assault. The navy engaged the LTTE flotilla of small boats, but the ground attack continued. Heavy fighting continued into the night.

On March 28, the LTTE offensive was closing in on a four-base government complex. By next morning those bases fell. Several SLA tanks were also captured.

By March 30, the Tigers took another government base and managed to cut the A-9 highway. At this point, thousands of civilian refugees had fled the area. The air force had been hitting rebel columns caught in the open while the navy had prevented the rebels from landing reinforcements along the coast.

By April 3, the LTTE continued to hold a four kilometer stretch of the A-9 highway. However, more army reinforcements were coming in by air and sea, air strikes and navy ships were also hitting the rebels hard, stalling the LTTE offensive.

On April 11, the army managed, after two weeks of heavy fighting, to retake the A-9 highway and clear all rebel positions from it. On April 18, however, the LTTE renewed its offensive on the A-9 and cut the highway once again. By the next day all remaining SLA troops were in retreat toward the Elephant Pass military base, which was coming under heavy LTTE artillery fire. Thus the operation to take the highway was a success for the Tigers and this led to more success in the Second Battle of Elephant Pass, which caused the fall of the Elephant Pass base four days later.

== See also ==
- List of Sri Lankan Civil War battles
