= Kozhikombu =

Village in Kottayam District, Kerala, India

Kozhikombu is a small village in Kottayam district, Kerala, India. It is situated 3 km away from the Pala town.

== Religious places ==
- Nithya Sahaya Matha Church is 0.5 km away.
- St. Francis Assisi Church is 1 km away.
