= Paranthan railway station =

Railway station in Sri Lanka

Paranthan railway station பரந்தன் පරන්තන්පරන්තන් දුම්රිය ස්ථානය
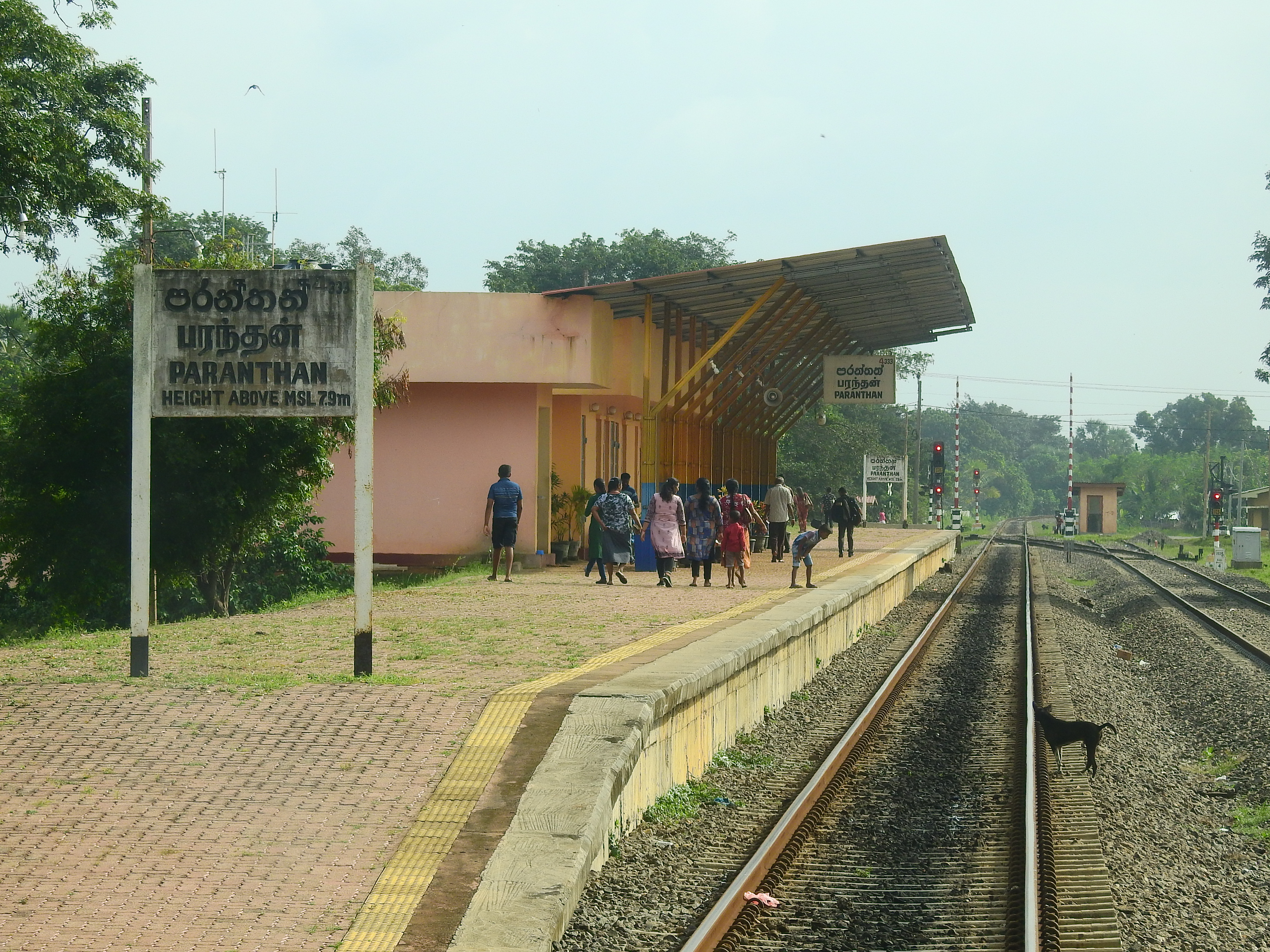
- The station in December 2019

General information
- Location: Paranthan; Sri Lanka
- Coordinates: 9°26′15.10″N 80°24′26.20″E
- System: Sri Lankan Railway Station
- Owner: Sri Lanka Railways
- Line: Northern Line

Other information
- Status: Functioning

History
- Rebuilt: 4 March 2014

Services
Preceding station	Sri Lanka Railways	Following station
Kilinochchi toward Colombo Fort	Yal Devi; Northern Line	Elephant Pass toward Kankesanthurai
Location

Paranthan railway station (Tamil: பரந்தன் தொடருந்து நிலையம் Parantaṉ toṭaruntu nilaiyam, Sinhala: පරන්තන් දුම්රිය ස්ථානය) is a railway station located in the town of Paranthan in northern Sri Lanka. It is owned by Sri Lanka Railways, the state-owned railway operator, and is part of the Northern Line, which connects the north of the country with the capital, Colombo. The popular Yarl Devi service stops at the station. The station was non-operational from 1990 and 2014 due to the Sri Lankan civil war. The Northern Line segment between Kilinochchi and Pallai, which includes Paranthan, was re-opened on 4 March 2014.
