= Vasanthan =

Vasanthan is a surname. Notable people with the surname include:

- James Vasanthan, Indian film score composer
- Vallipuram Vasanthan (1966–1987), Sri Lankan Tamil rebel
