= Puthukkudiyiruppu Central College =

Public provincial school in Mullaitivu District, Sri Lanka

- புதுக்குடியிருப்பு மத்திய கல்லூரி

Location
- Puthukkudiyiruppu, Mullaitivu District, Northern Province; Sri Lanka
- 9°18′45.50″N 80°41′39.40″E

Information
- School type: Public provincial National School
- Founded: 5 January 1955
- School district: Mullaitivu Education Zone
- Authority: Northern Provincial Council
- School number: 1404001
- Principal: S. Subaramaniam
- Grades: 6-13
- Gender: Mixed
- Age range: 11-18
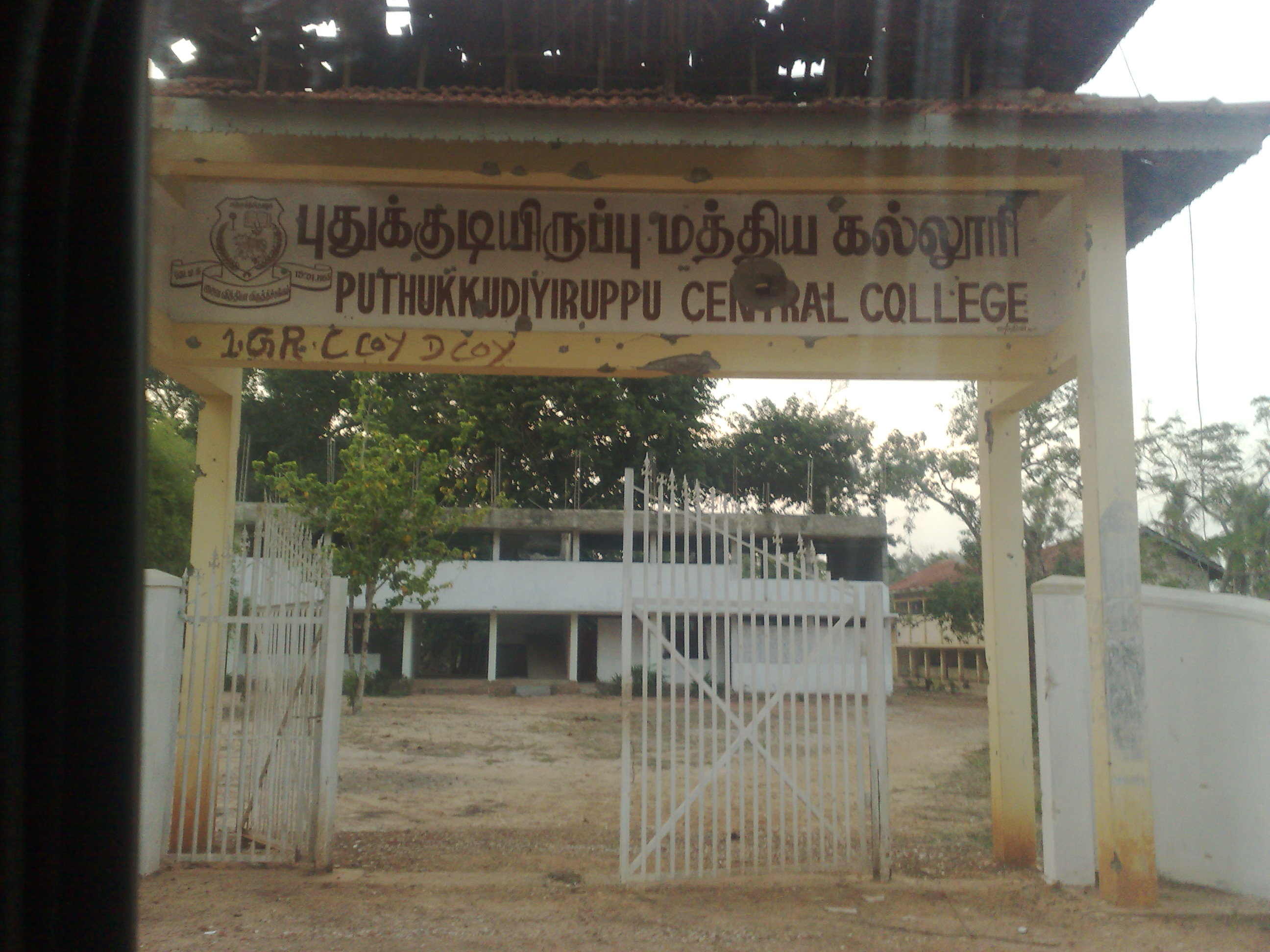

Puthukkudiyiruppu Central College (Tamil: புதுக்குடியிருப்பு மத்திய கல்லூரி Putukkuṭiyiruppu Mattiya Kallūri) is a provincial school in Puthukkudiyiruppu, Sri Lanka.

== History ==
The school was founded on January 5, 1955, by the Hindu Vittiya Development Association and was named Srisubramanya Vidyalayam. M. Nesaratnam served as the school's first principal. Initially, it offered classes from grade one to grade ten, but it was later expanded to include Advanced Level classes. Currently, the school provides education from grade six to Advanced Level. The school's golden jubilee was celebrated in 2005 with support from alumni, and an auditorium was donated by former students from the United Kingdom.On 05-03-2000 in UK at London the 1st abroad alumni association initiated by Mr Sangarapillai Murugaiah for this school.

== See also ==
- List of schools in Northern Province, Sri Lanka
