= First Battle of Elephant Pass =

1991 battle in the Sri Lankan civil war

Coordinates: 9.54726°N 80.408936°E

- Part of the Sri Lankan civil war
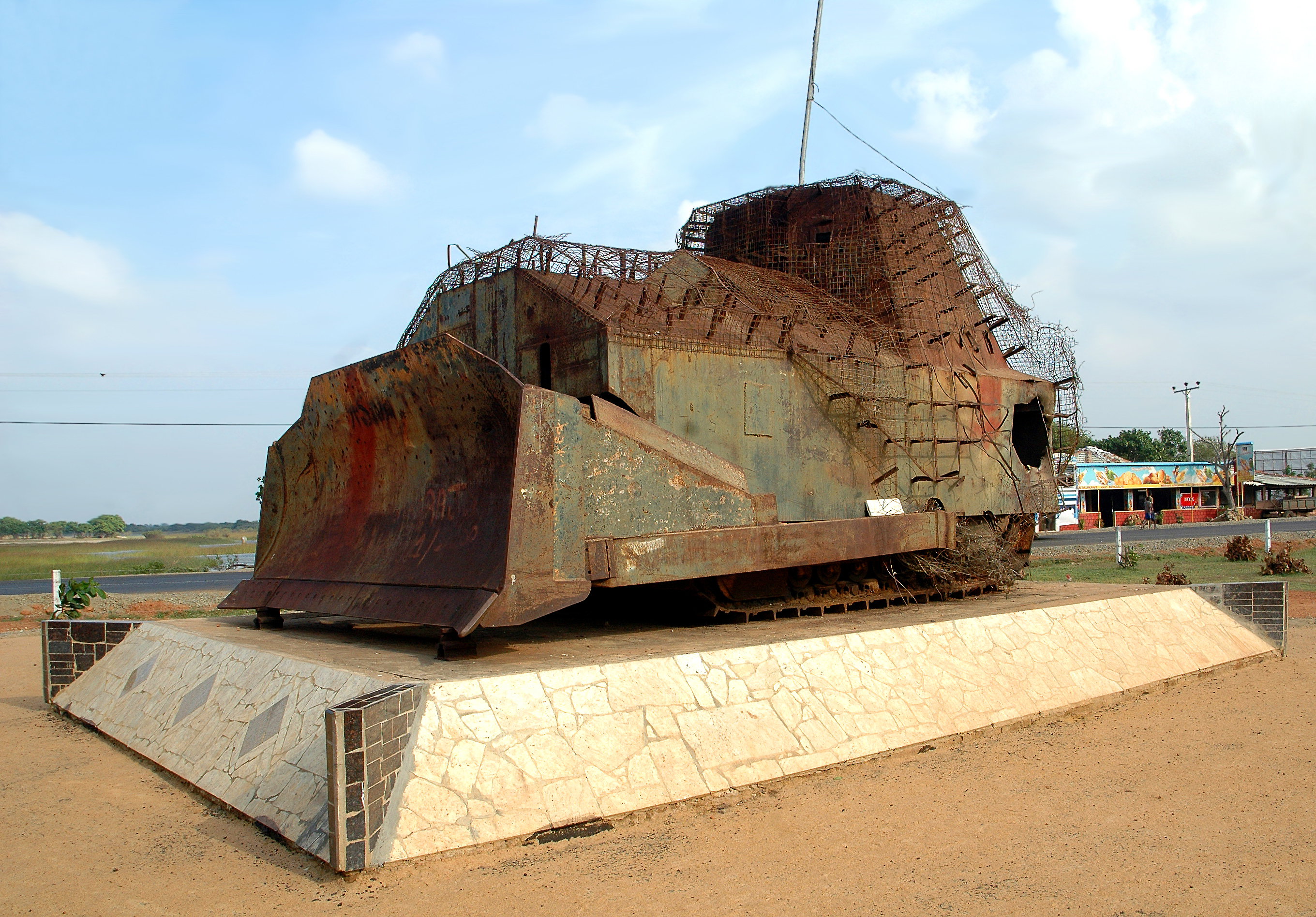
- Improvised armored bulldozer of Liberation Tigers of Tamil Eelam used in the battle. Today, it is one of the Sri Lankan Civil War memorials.
Date	July 10 – August 9, 1991
Location	Elephant Pass, Sri Lanka
Result	Sri Lankan Army victory

Belligerents
Sri Lanka	Liberation Tigers of Tamil Eelam

Commanders and leaders
Maj. Gen. Denzil Kobbekaduwa; Brig. Vijaya Wimalaratne; Sri Lanka Army Col. Anton Wijendra; Col. Sarath Fonseka; Col. Gamini Angammana; Maj. Sanath Karunaratne; Sri Lanka Navy Rear Adm. Quintus Wickramaratne; Sri Lanka Navy Capt. H. R. Amaraweera; Sri Lanka Air Force Group Capt. Dick Sally	Velupillai Prabhakaran

Units involved
Garrison: Sri Lanka Armed Forces; Sri Lanka Army; Sri Lanka Sinha Regiment; 6th Battalion; Operation Balavegaya Relief Force: Sri Lanka Armed Forces; Sri Lanka Army; Sri Lanka Light Infantry; Gajaba Regiment; Sri Lanka Sinha Regiment; Gemunu Watch; Sri Lanka Armoured Corps; Sri Lanka Artillery; Sri Lanka Navy; Sri Lanka Air Force	Liberation Tigers of Tamil Eelam; Charles Anthony Brigade; Female fighters' wing; Improvised armoured unit; Anti-aircraft & sniper teams

Strength
800 (10,000 reinforcements)	5,000

Casualties and losses
202–400+ killed 156 killed, 748 wounded (SL claim)	602 killed

The First Battle of Elephant Pass (Codenamed Operation Aakaya Kadal Veli, which means 'Air-Sea-Land' by LTTE) was fought in July 1991 for the control of the Sri Lankan military base of Elephant Pass, which was of strategic importance as it linked the northern mainland known as Wanni with the Jaffna Peninsula. The battle was fought between troops of the Sri Lankan army and the Liberation Tigers of Tamil Eelam, commonly known as LTTE.

== Battle ==
On July 10, 1991, the LTTE launched a massive attack at Elephant Pass. The battle was, up until that time, the most violent and bloody confrontation that ever took place between the LTTE and the Sri Lankan Army. The LTTE had previously surrounded the base and blocked off routes north and south so no reinforcements could come in. Also, at the beginning of July, the LTTE moved anti-aircraft guns close to the base so no helicopters could bring in supplies. Thus the 800 troops of the 6th Battalion of the Sri Lanka Sinha Regiment stationed at the base were trapped, yet led by Maj. (later Maj. Gen.) Sanath Karunaratne they fought on. The assault came from the south. On the first day, the LTTE captured a few bunkers held by Sri Lankan troops. During the attack, the LTTE used steel-plated earth-moving vehicles and tractors. They fired hundreds of mortar rounds on the positions of the Sri Lankan forces. The next day the second-in-command of the base was killed in a mortar attack.

Helicopters were not able to land at the base because of heavy fire. Eventually, the Rest House camp in the southern sector of the base fell into the hands of the LTTE. Sustaining heavy losses, the Sri Lankan troops fell back to the rearward positions. As dusk fell the LTTE launched several attacks with hundreds of fighters and surrounded the army's fortifications. The defending troops were shocked by the sight of a hitherto unknown bulldozer covered with armoured plates that looked like a huge tank. It was equipped with a machine gun on top of it and contained a large supply of arms and ammunition inside.

== Operation Balavegaya ==
Fierce fighting continued for four days before reinforcements were able to be sent. A force of 10,000 troops was dispatched to the defenders' aid. An amphibious landing was conducted at Vettilaikerni, just 12 kilometres east of the base. However, much resistance was encountered from the Tigers, and it took the relief force 18 days to reach the Elephant Pass base.

The troops finally reached the Elephant Pass base on the evening of August 3. Fighting continued until August 9, when the LTTE began to retreat. They suffered 950 fighters killed, according to Sri lankan military. The army gave the number of its soldiers killed at 156 killed and 748 wounded, but LTTE claimed that more than 400 died. Estimates in later years put the number of dead on both sides at about 2,000. The president called the fight the "Mother of All Battles". However, 8 1/2 years later the base was attacked again, and that time the Tigers overran and took it. It was another 8 1/2 years before the Sri Lankan Army took the base back, in the (Third Battle of Elephant Pass) in its "Northern Offensive", which ended in May 2009 and resulted in the complete destruction of the LTTE.

== See also ==
- Second Battle of Elephant Pass
- Third Battle of Elephant Pass
- List of Sri Lankan Civil War battles
- Gamini Kularatne
