= Battle of Jaffna (1995) =

- Part of Eelam War III and the Sri Lankan Civil War
Date	October 17 – December 5, 1995
Location	Jaffna, Sri Lanka
Result	Sri Lankan Army victory
Territorial changes	Sri Lankan Army recapture City of Jaffna

Belligerents
Sri Lanka	Liberation Tigers of Tamil Eelam

Commanders and leaders
Major General (later General) Rohan Daluwatte, Brigadier (later Major General) Janaka Perera	V. Prabhakaran

Units involved
Sri Lanka Armed Forces; Sri Lanka Army; 53 Division; 532 Infantry Brigade; 531 Air Mobile Brigade; 534 Independent Brigade; 534 Independent Brigade	Unknown

Strength
10,000	Unknown

Casualties and losses
500 killed (According to Sri Lankan Government claims)	430 LTTE Killed

The Battle of Jaffna was fought from October to December 1995 for the city of Jaffna.

== Battle ==
The city of Jaffna had been for years a major stronghold of the Liberation Tigers of Tamil Eelam (LTTE). The Tigers viewed the city as the capital of their new independent state. The city was briefly recaptured by the Indian army in 1987 during Operation Pawan but the city was later captured again by the Tigers.

The newly elected president of Sri Lanka, Chandrika Kumaratunga, ordered this offensive after peace talks with the LTTE broke down after the Tigers attacked and destroyed Sri Lankan Navy gunboats and fired anti-aircraft missiles at Sri Lankan Airforce AVRO aircraft over Jaffna. Control of the peninsula became vital to the control of Palali airbase.

On October 17, 1995, 10,000 SLA commenced the campaign to Jaffna city (25 miles away) and in a 50-day battle that lasted until December 5, 1995, up to 500 Sri Lankan Army soldiers and over 430 LTTE cadres were killed. In the end the army managed to take the city and the peninsula from the Tigers, thus crippling the LTTE, however most of the LTTE forces managed to retreat into the jungle.

== Aftermath ==
Initially the Army stated that the battle for Jaffna ended the war and the LTTE would never again be able to fight major battles against the government. It was believed that the insurgency was at its end. However this was not the case, which was apparent when the LTTE attacked an army detachment in Batticaloa district December 23, killing 33 troops. Military sources reported that more than 30 rebels were killed. Over the next seven months the LTTE reorganised and regrouped and in July 1996, the rebels launched Operation Unceasing Waves, which was the codename for the attack on the military base at Mullaitivu. More than 1,500 soldiers were killed and the base was destroyed.

== See also ==
- Battle of Jaffna (2006)
- List of Sri Lankan Civil War battles
