= Operation Viraat =

Indian peacekeeping operation in Sri Lanka

Operation Viraat (Sanskrit: विराट Virāṭa, lit. "Operation Giant"), along with Operation Trishul, was an anti-insurgency operation launched by the Indian Peace Keeping Force (IPKF) against the Liberation Tigers of Tamil Eelam (LTTE) in April 1988 in the Northern Province of Sri Lanka, in the Elephant Pass and the districts of Mannar, Mullaitivu and Vavuniya.

The operation was planned as a result of the evolving doctrine among the Indian high command of conducting search and destroy missions against LTTE strongholds instead of holding key strong points. It utilized approximately 15,000 troops including armoured corps, paratroopers, as well as the infantry troops and army aviation. The operation achieved some success in disrupting LTTE operations, with seizures of weaponry and inflicting limited casualties among the LTTE cadres. By the end of summer 1988, these operations had forced the LTTE to move its stronghold, when it started to operate out of Nithikaikulam and adjacent riverine areas.

During the Operation Viraat, the IPKF uncovered well prepared LTTE defenses, including concrete bunkers with electric generators, as well as caches of arms and reserves. The IPKF also suffered in this unconventional warfare, with the LTTE frequently ambushing IPKF convoys and patrols.
