= Battle of Vidattaltivu =

Battle during the Sri Lankan Civil War

- Part of Sri Lankan Civil War, 2008–2009 SLA Northern offensive
| Date | July 16, 2008 |
| Location | 20 km north of Mannar |
| Result | Government Victory |

Belligerents
| Military of Sri Lanka | Liberation Tigers of Tamil Eelam |

Commanders and leaders
| (Sri Lanka) Lt. Gen Sarath Fonseka: (Sri Lanka) Brig. Shavendra Silva | Velupillai Prabhakaran |

Units involved
| Sri Lanka Armed Forces: Army; 58 Division | Unknown |

The Battle of Vidattaltivu was fought over the town of Vidattaltivu, Sri Lanka, by the 58 Division of the Sri Lankan Military and the Liberation Tigers of Tamil Eelam (LTTE). The battle took place on July 16, 2008, part of the Northern Theatre of Eelam War IV during the Sri Lankan civil war. The 58 Division victory in the battle marked the first time the Army had been in control of the town in 21 years. According to the Sri Lankan Ministry of Defence, the town had been the primary base used by the LTTE for its maritime operations and had also served as their logistics hub, making the taking of the town by the Army a "fatal blow" to the LTTE.

== See also ==
- List of Sri Lankan Civil War battles
