= Operation Trishul =

Indian peacekeeping operation in Sri Lanka

Operation Trishul (Sanskrit: त्रिशूल Triśūla, lit. "Operation Trident"), along with Operation Viraat, was an anti-insurgency operation launched by the Indian Peace Keeping Force (IPKF) against the Liberation Tigers of Tamil Eelam (LTTE) in April 1988 in Northern Province of Sri Lanka, in the Elephant Pass and the districts of Mannar, Mullaitivu and Vavuniya.

The operation was planned as a result of the evolving doctrine among the Indian high command of conducting search and destroy missions against LTTE strongholds instead of holding key strongpoints.
