= Puthukkudiyiruppu (Batticaloa) =

Town in Batticaloa District, Sri Lanka

Puthukkudiyiruppu (Tamil meaning: new settlement) is a village in the Batticaloa District of Sri Lanka. It can be spelled in different ways in English, however in the local Tamil language it can only be spelled one way. There is another Puthukkudiyiruppu in the Mullaitivu District of Sri Lanka.
