= Road to Nandikadal =

2016 book

Road to Nandikadal රණමඟ ඔස්සේ නන්දිකඩාල්
- First edition (Sinhala)
- Author: Kamal Gunaratne
- Language: Sinhala; English
- Publication date: 6 September 2016
- Publication place: Sri Lanka
- Media type: Print (hardcover, paperback)
- Pages: 770
- ISBN: 9789554323704

Road to Nandikadal (Sinhala: රණමඟ ඔස්සේ නන්දිකඩාල්, raṇaman̆ga ŏsse nandikaḍāl) is a book about the defeat of the LTTE. It was written by former Major General Kamal Gunaratne. The book was released on 6 September 2016, a day after Gunaratne's retirement. The Sinhala and English versions of the book were released on the same day. It covers several incidents that occurred during the Sri Lankan Civil War, including the killing of Velupillai Prabhakaran.

Major General Kamal Gunaratne was the commander of the 53 Division in Sri Lanka Army, that is believed to have killed the LTTE leader Velupillai Prabhakaran.

== Reception ==
All the copies of the book were sold one within one hour during Colombo International Book Fair in 2016 and is believed to have been a record best-seller in Sri Lanka.

However the book was criticised by then Foreign Minister Mangala Samaraweera for historical inaccuracies and contradictions.
