= Murukandy railway station =

Railway station in northern Sri Lanka

Murukandy railway station முறிகண்டி මුරුකන්ඩි දුම්රිය ස්ථානය
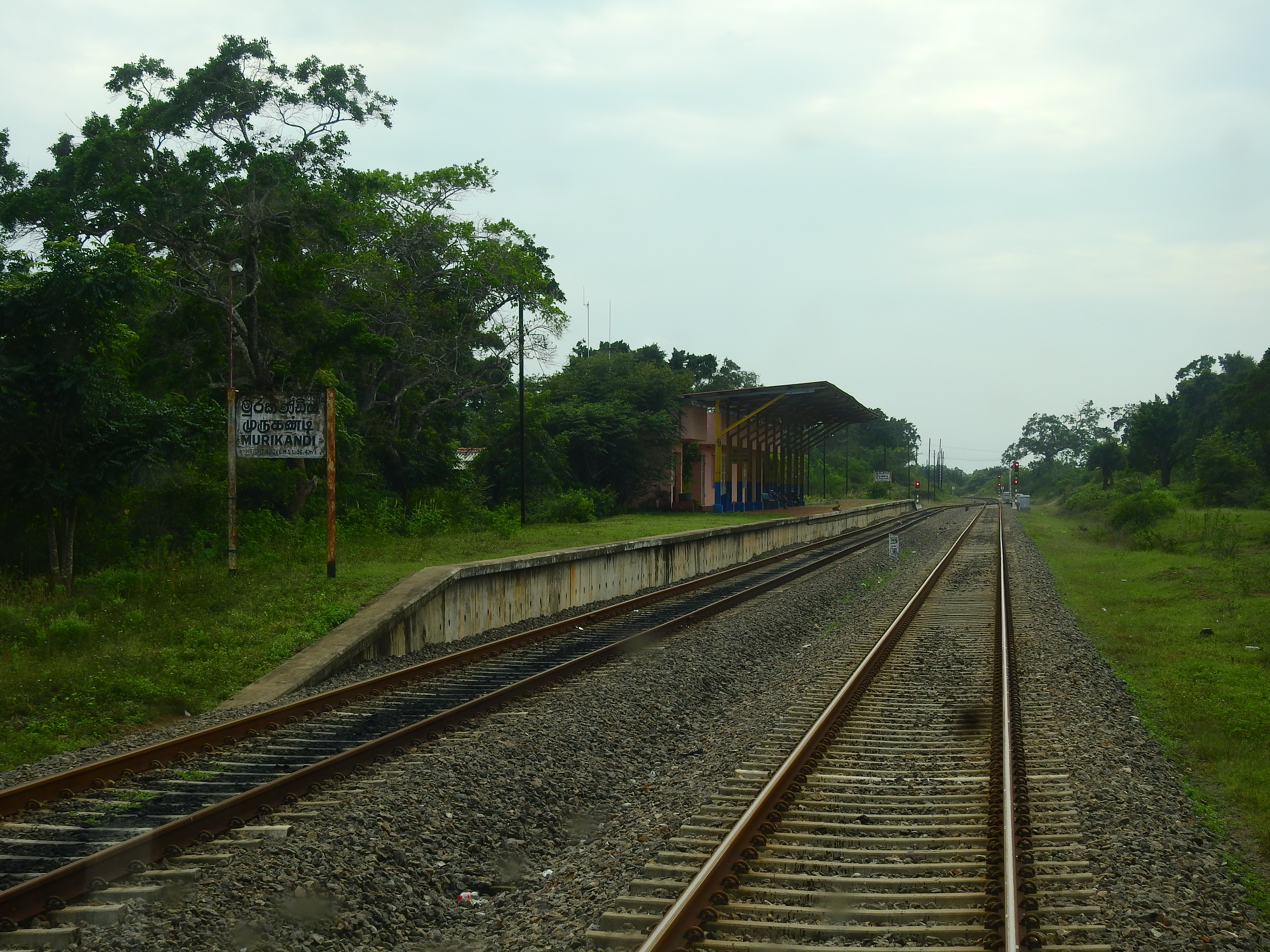
- The station in December 2019

General information
- Location: Murukandy; Sri Lanka
- Coordinates: 9°18′15.60″N 80°24′25.00″E
- System: Sri Lankan Railway Station
- Owner: Sri Lanka Railways
- Line: Northern Line

Other information
- Status: Functioning

History
- Rebuilt: 14 September 2013

Services
Preceding station	Sri Lanka Railways	Following station
Mankulam toward Colombo Fort	Yal Devi; Northern Line	Kilinochchi toward Kankesanthurai
Location

Murukandy railway station (Tamil: முறிகண்டி தொடருந்து நிலையம் Muṟikaṇṭi toṭaruntu nilaiyam, Sinhala: මුරුකන්ඩි දුම්රිය ස්ථානය) is a railway station in the town of Murukandy in northern Sri Lanka. Owned by Sri Lanka Railways, the state-owned railway operator, the station is part of the Northern Line which links the north with the capital Colombo. The popular Yarl Devi service calls at the station. The station was not functioning between 1990 and 2013 due to the civil war. The Northern Line between Omanthai and Kilinochchi, which includes Murukandy, was re-opened on 14 September 2013.
