= Pallai railway station =

Railway station in northern Sri Lanka

Pallai பளை පලාලි
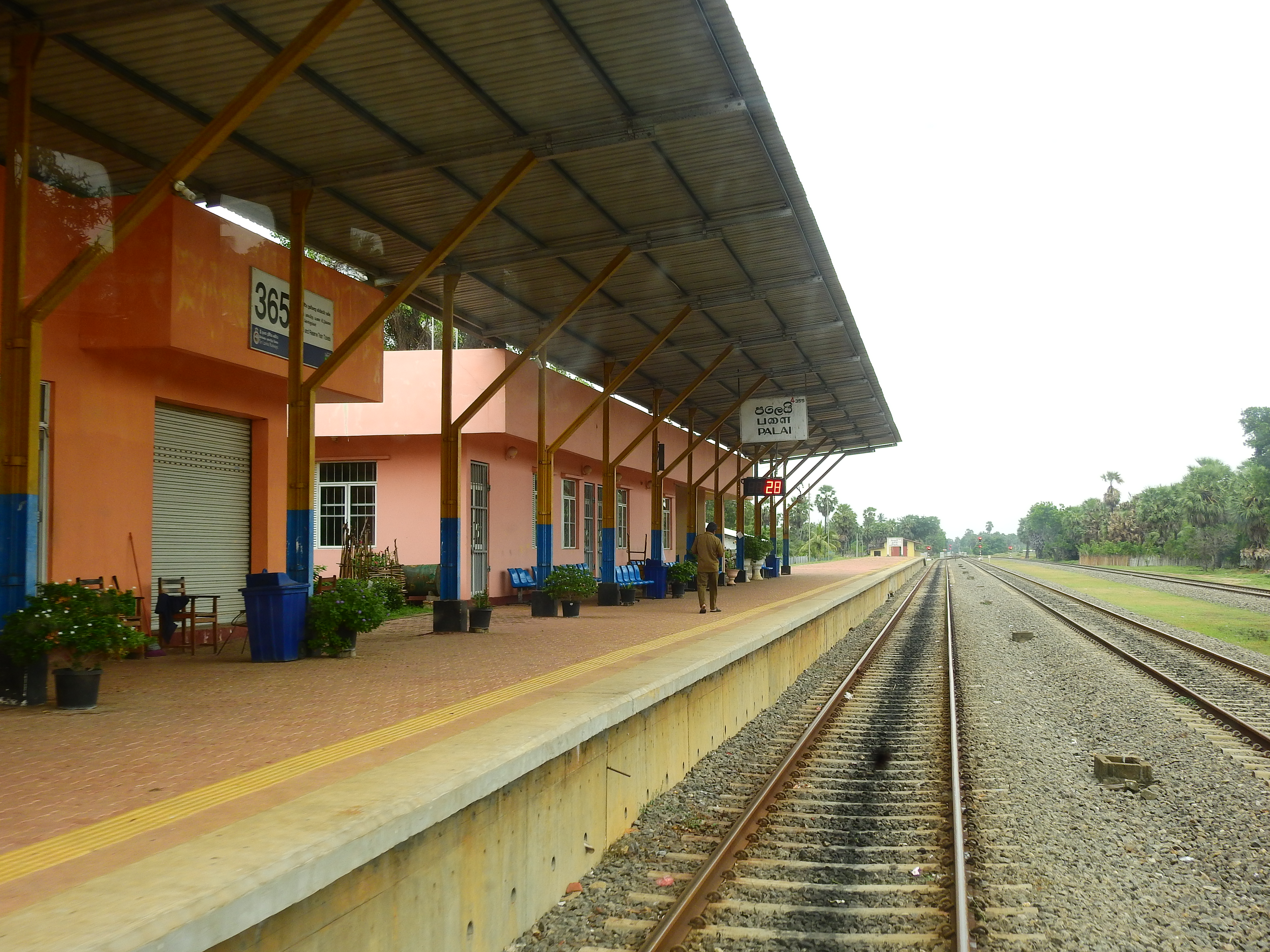
- The station in December 2019

General information
- Location: Pallai; Sri Lanka
- Coordinates: 9°36′28.80″N 80°19′46.70″E
- System: Sri Lankan Railway Station
- Owner: Sri Lanka Railways
- Line: Northern Line

Other information
- Status: Functioning

History
- Rebuilt: 4 March 2014

Services
Preceding station	Sri Lanka Railways	Following station
Elephant Pass toward Colombo Fort	Yal Devi; Northern Line	Eluthumadduval toward Kankesanthurai
Location

Pallai railway station (Tamil: பளை தொடருந்து நிலையம் Paḷai toṭaruntu nilaiyam) is a railway station in the town of Pallai in northern Sri Lanka. Owned by Sri Lanka Railways, the state-owned railway operator, the station is part of the Northern Line which links the north with the capital Colombo. The popular Yarl Devi service calls at the station. The station was not functioning between 1990 and 2014 due to the civil war. The Northern Line between Kilinochchi and Pallai was re-opened on 4 March 2014.
