= Iranaipalai =

Coordinates: 9°20′25″N 80°42′45″E

Iranaipalai [Tamil: இரணைப்பாலை] is a village in Mullaitivu District, Sri Lanka.
