= Vinayagam =

Vinayagam is a surname. Notable people with the surname include:

- Manikka Vinayagam (1943–2021), Indian playback singer
- M. Karpaga Vinayagam (born 1946), Indian judge
- Sethu Vinayagam (1949–2009), Indian actor
