= Vavunathivu =

Town in Batticaloa, Sri Lanka

Vavunathivu (Vavuna-thivu) is a town in Batticaloa District, Sri Lanka. It is located about 5 km southwest of Batticaloa and 15 km northwest of Kokkadichcholai.

== See also ==
- Kokkadichcholai
- 1997 Vavunathivu Offensive
