= Kamal Gunaratne =

Sri Lankan general

General Kamal Gunaratne WWV, RWP, RSP, USP

Secretary to the Ministry of Defence & State Ministry of National Security and Disaster Management
- In office 18 November 2019 – 23 September 2024
- President: Gotabaya Rajapaksa; Ranil Wickremesinghe
- Minister: Gotabaya Rajapaksa; Ranil Wickremesinghe
- Preceded by: Shantha Kottegoda
- Succeeded by: Sampath Thuyacontha

Personal details
- Born: 6 September 1961 (age 64)
- Education: Dharmapala Vidyalaya; Ananda College; Sri Lanka Military Academy

Military service
- Allegiance: Sri Lanka
- Branch/service: Sri Lanka Army
- Years of service: 1982–2016
- Rank: General
- Unit: Gajaba Regiment
- Commands: Security Forces Headquarters – Wanni, 53 Division; Master General Ordinance (2015–2016)
- Battles/wars: Sri Lankan Civil War, 1987–89 JVP Insurrection, Operation Yukthiya
- Awards: Weera Wickrama Vibhushanaya; Rana Wickrama Padakkama; Rana Sura Padakkama; Uttama Seva Padakkama

General G. D. H. Kamal Gunaratne, WWV, RWP, RSP, USP is a retired Sri Lankan army general. He was the Secretary to the Ministry of Defence and the State Ministry of National Security and Disaster Management from 2019 to 2024. A retired career officer of the Sri Lanka Army, Gunaratne had served as the former Commander Security Forces Headquarters - Wanni, general officer commanding (GOC), 53 Division and was a former Deputy Ambassador to Brazil. He was the GOC of the 53 Division which killed the LTTE leader Velupillai Prabhakaran at Nandikadal, Mullaitivu.

== Early life and education ==
He was born to a family of teachers; his father was a school principal. Educated at Dharmapala Vidyalaya and Ananda College, he joined the army in 1981 as a cadet officer, undergoing basic officer training at the Sri Lanka Military Academy.

== Military career ==
=== Early career ===
After completing his basic training and a commando course, he was commissioned into the Rajarata Rifles as a second lieutenant. Following the disbandment of the Rajarata Rifles, he was one of the initial officers of the newly formed Gajaba Regiment, attached to the 1st Battalion, Gajaba Regiment (1GR) under the command of Lieutenant Colonel Vijaya Wimalaratne and Major Gotabaya Rajapaksa. 1GR was deployed to the Jaffna peninsula between 1983 and 1984 and again 1985 with the escalation of the Sri Lankan Civil War. Serving as a platoon commander, company commander in the Gajaba Regiment, he was promoted to the ranks of lieutenant and captain. In 1987 he took part in the Vadamarachchi Operation and thereafter was deployed to Colombo for internal security duties. He attended the Infantry Young Officers’ Course at the School of Infantry and tactics, Pakistan in 1988 and the Junior Command Course at the College of Combat (now the Army War College, Mhow) in 1990. In 1990, he was the officer commanding the Mankulam Army Camp when it came under intense LTTE attack and under orders from the Wanni Headquarters made a successful withdrawal from the besieged camp. In 1991, he was promoted to the rank of major and was appointed Second in Command of the 6th Battalion, GR. He was the officer commanding the Silawathura Army Camp when it came under siege by the LTTE, holding off the LTTE attack for several days until 6GR was relieved by reinforcements. During the siege he was wounded. Following deployment to Weli Oya he was once again seriously wounded. After returning to operational duties, he was transferred to Army Headquarters as a Grade II Staff Officer in the Directorate of Logistics.

=== Field command ===
In 1994, having been promoted to lieutenant colonel he took command of the 6GR, taking part in the Operation Riviresa until 1997. Thereafter, he served as Commandant at Infantry Training Centre, Grade I Staff Officer at Joint Services Operational Headquarters coordinating the Operation Jayasikurui. In 1999, he attended the Senior Command Course at the College of Combat (now the Army War College, Mhow), where he gained a MPhil at the University of Madras and thereafter attended the Command and Staff Course at the Command and Staff College, Quetta, gaining his psc qualification and Masters in Art and Science of Warfare from the University of Balochistan. As a colonel he was Brigade Commander of the Air Mobile Brigade at the onset of the Eelam War IV and was promoted to the rank of brigadier, he went on to take command of the 55 Division and 53 Division and was promoted to the rank of major general. 53 Division took part in many major battles leading to the final battle at Nandikadal, leading to the death of LTTE Leader Velupillai Prabhakaran.

==== Accused of war crimes ====
Some NGO accused 53 Division under Kamal Gunaratne for executions of LTTE cadres, during the heat of the war near Nandikadal in May 2009.

=== Higher command ===
Following the war Gunaratne Defence and Strategic Studies Course at the National Defence College, India (2011) National Defence College, New Delhi, gaining his ndc qualification. He served as adjutant general, Security Forces Headquarters – Wanni, Deputy Ambassador to Brazil and Master General Ordnance at the Army Headquarters from 16 February 2015 to 4 September 2016 before his retirement in 2016. He was also the Colonel of the Regiment of the Mechanized Infantry Regiment and the Gajaba Regiment.

== Political career ==
He authored an autobiography named Road to Nandikadal on the war against LTTE, which was the best-selling book of the 2016 Colombo International Book Fair. Post-retirement, Gunaratne became an active supporter of former Defence Secretary Lieutenant Colonel Gotabhaya Rajapaksa in his presidential campaign during the 2019 Presidential election. Following the election, President Rajapaksa appointed Major General Gunaratne as Defense Secretary succeeding General Shantha Kottegoda on 19 November 2019. In December 2020, he was elevated to the rank of general by President Rajapaksa.

== Awards and decorations ==
General Gunaratne has received some of the highest awards in the Sri Lankan armed forces, which includes the Weera Wickrama Vibhushanaya, Rana Wickrama Padakkama and the Rana Sura Padakkama. He was awarded the Command and Staff College, Quetta Centenary Medal by the Government of Pakistan in 2020.

Weera Wickrama Vibhushanaya	Rana Wickrama Padakkama (with clasp)	Rana Sura Padakkama	
Uttama Seva Padakkama	Desha Putra Sammanaya	Eastern Humanitarian Operations Medal (with clasp)	Northern Humanitarian Operations Medal (with clasp)
Purna Bhumi Padakkama	North and East Operations Medal (with clasp)	Vadamarachchi Operation Medal	Riviresa Campaign Services Medal
50th Independence Anniversary Commemoration Medal	Sri Lanka Army 50th Anniversary Medal	Sri Lanka Armed Services Long Service Medal (with clasp)	Command and Staff College Quetta Centenary Medal

== Publications ==
- Road to Nandikadal - Sinhala and English translation.
- Kadol Aththu
- Uthara Devi
- Gotabhaya - Sinhala and English translation.
- Pathalayoo

== See also ==
- List of Sri Lankan non-career Permanent Secretaries
