= Battle of Silawathura =

1991 battle of the Sri Lankan Civil War

The Battle of Silawathura was fought in 1991 in Silawathura, Sri Lanka. The Sri Lankan military camp at Silawathura was put to siege by the Liberation Tigers of Tamil Eelam (LTTE) for several days before they were repulsed.
