= Eelam War III =

Third phase of the Sri Lankan Civil War, from 1995 to 2002

- Part of the Sri Lankan Civil War
| Date | 19 April 1995 – 22 February 2002 |
| Location | Sri Lanka |
| Result | Ceasefire |

Belligerents
| Sri Lanka | Liberation Tigers of Tamil Eelam |

Commanders and leaders
| (Sri Lanka) Chandrika Kumaratunga (1994–2005) | Velupillai Prabhakaran |

Units involved
| Sri Lanka Armed Forces: Sri Lanka Army; Sri Lanka Navy; Sri Lanka Air Force | Liberation Tigers of Tamil Eelam; Sea Tigers; Air Tigers; Black Tigers |

Strength
| 130,000 | 13,500 |

Casualties and losses
| 10,838 | 2,746 |

Eelam War III is the name given to the third phase of the Sri Lankan civil war between the Sri Lankan military and the separatist Liberation Tigers of Tamil Eelam (LTTE).

After the period of 100 days cease-fire the hostilities broke out on 19 April 1995. The LTTE - Sea Tigers planted explosives in two gun boats known as SLNS 'Sooraya' and 'Ranasuru', and blew them up.

Also, a new weapon "Stinger", a shoulder-launched anti-aircraft missile was used in this conflict by the LTTE. This was used to take down two Sri Lankan Air Force AVRO aircraft flying over the Jaffna peninsula.

Eelam War III also marked the rising success of the LTTE, as they managed to capture key districts such as Kilinochchi and Mullaitivu, and took over the Elephant Pass base. With the path clear towards the Muhumalai and Nagarkovil FDLs, the LTTE launched Operation Unceasing Waves IV in efforts to capture the Jaffna peninsula.

By the end of Eelam War III, the LTTE had control of nearly 30% of the entire island.

== Major military operations (in chronological order) ==
- 19 April, 1995: The LTTE sinks SLNS Sooraya and SLNS Ranasuru ending peace talks.
- 28 June, 1995: The LTTE overruns the Sri Lankan military base at Mandaitivu.
- 9 July, 1995: SLA conducted a major operation to remove LTTE from Jaffna Peninsula.
- 28 July, 1995: The LTTE attack the Sri Lankan military base at Weli Oya and is repulsed with heavy loses.
- 17 October - 5 December, 1995 : Government launches Operation Riviresa -recapturing the Jaffna peninsular from the LTTE.
- 23 December, 1995 :LTTE attacked on army detachment in the Batticaloa district killing 33 troops.
- 18 July, 1996 : The LTTE overruns the Sri Lankan military base at Mullaitivu, the attack carried out after midnight. The number of killed in action and missing in action were around 1500 as per military sources. There were more than 4000 LTTE cadre's participated the attack and captured large quantity of arms and military equipment. The base was used as Sri Lanka Army's 215 Brigade Headquarters. One of the major encounters broke out between the LTTE and the Special Forces (SF) commando reinforcements Lt. Col. Laphir and 36 others were killed and 60 more were wounded. Sri Lanka Air-force pilots landed the second batch of Commando's in the same location and also taken the dead body of Lt. Col.Laphir by rope pulled down from the helicopter under heavy LTTE gunfire. The code name given by the LTTE "Oyatha Alaikal" (Endless Waves) to attack the Mullaitivu Military base and SLA code was named as "Operation Thrivida Pahara" for the rescue mission.
- 26 July - 3 October, 1996: SLA launched Operation Sathjaya to capture Kilinochchi from LTTE. After 70 days of siege Army finally captured Kilinochchi
- 11 December, 1996: LTTE militants numbering over 500 cadres began their attack on the STF detachment.
- 7 March, 1997: LTTE militants attacked and overran the SLA military camp at Vavunathivu off Batticaloa.
- 23 March, 1997:A naval battle fought between the Sri Lanka Navy and Sea Tigers on 23 March 1997, off the coast of town of Mullativu.
- Thandikulam-Omanthi offensive 10 June - 25 June, 1997:The Thandikulam–Omanthai offensive was a battle for the control of the towns of Thandikulam and Omanthai in Sri Lanka in June 1997.
- 4 December, 1997:SLA Two Detachment ran into a Ambush by LTTE. It became the "Worst Debacle" suffered by SLA before Second Battle of Elephant Pass.
- Operation Jayasikurui (1997-1998): In May 1997 SLA launched Operation Jayasikurui (Certain Victory) to open land route to Jaffna Peninsula. The main objective of the operation was to liberate A9 Highway from Vavuniya to Kilinochchi. The total distance was approximately 70 km. Army abandoned this operation after 18 months without achieving its main goal.
- Operation Unceasing Waves II: LTTE launched Operation Unceasing Waves II also known as 1998 Battle of Kilinochchi. . LTTE recaptured Kilinochchi town from Army after 3 days of intense battle.
- Operation Rana Gosa(Battle cry): It was carried out in 4 phases. Army captured more than 500sq.km. of LTTE territory in Vanni (Sri Lanka).
- Operation Rivibala: It was a secret operation launched by the Army to capture Oddusuddan. It was an important LTTE base near LTTE's stronghold Mullaitivu.
- Operation Unceasing Waves III: LTTE launched Operation Unceasing Waves III on the first week of November 1999. On first day LTTE began Oddusuddan offensive (1999). After capturing the base they attacked Kanakarayankulam Army HQ. After the fall of the base LTTE recaptured most part of Vanni .
  - Second Battle of Elephant Pass: LTTE after capturing Vanni launched their attack to capture the Jaffna Peninsula. Known as Second Battle of Elephant Pass LTTE stepped up operation inside Jaffna Peninsula. Under the leadership of Brig. Balraj LTTE launched SL Civil War's largest behind enemy line operation. After 34 days long battle Elephant Pass base fell to Tamil Tigers.
- The Battle for the A-9 highway :The battle was fought in March and April 2000 for the control of the Sri Lankan A-9 highway
- Operation Unceasing Waves IV: On 26 September 2000 LTTE launched Operation Unceasing Waves IV. The objective of the operation was to capture Jaffna.
- LTTE's Unilateral ceasefire: On 24 December 2000 LTTE declared Unilateral ceasefire. It was ended on 24 April 2001.
- 24 July, 2001:The attack was one of the boldest the LTTE mounted during its war with the Sri Lankan government, and had a profound impact on the country's military, economy, and airline industry.
- Operation Agni keela: Army launched Operation Agnikeela on 25 April 2001 within few hours after LTTE ended their unilateral ceasefire. Its main objective was to retake Elephant Pass Garrison which they lost to LTTE one year back. LTTE had Booby trap whole paths and effectively positioned their artillery and mortar units. Due to heavy casualties, the army abandoned the operation.
- 2002 Peace Process: After few rounds of talks Sri Lankan Government and LTTE signed permanent ceasefire on 22 February 2002. Thus Eelam War III came to an end.

== Civilian killings ==
=== Kallarawa massacre ===
The Kallarawa massacre took place on 25 May 1995, when cadres of the Liberation Tigers of Tamil Eelam (LTTE) attacked the village of Kallarawa in eastern Sri Lanka, killing 42 Sinhalese civilians, including men, women and children. All the remaining civilian survivors fled the village after this incident leading to its depopulation. However survivors from the Sinhalese, Tamil and Muslim communities have returned to Kallarawa under the protection of the Sri Lankan Army.

=== Navaly church bombing ===
On 9 July 1995, the Sri Lankan Air Force using the Pucará aircraft dropped 8 to 13 bombs around the St. Peter and Paul Catholic Church, the Sri Kathirkama Murugan Hindu Temple and in surrounding residential areas of Navaly in the Jaffna Peninsula. It is estimated that at least 147 Tamil civilians who had taken refuge from the war inside the church as instructed by the government died as a result of the bombings and many more were injured.

=== Kumarapuram massacre ===
On February 11, 1996, the Sri Lankan Army soldiers massacred 26 Sri Lankan Tamil civilians in the village called Kumarapuram located in the Trincomalee district. According to several survivors interviewed by Amnesty International, 13 women and 7 children below the age of 12, were killed by soldiers from the 58th mile post and Dehiwatte army camps. Among the victims was a 15-year-old girl who was gang-raped before being shot dead. Among the villagers who survived the massacre were 28 individuals who were severely injured and they stated that the soldiers had attacked them with axes. Children as young as 3 and 6 years of age had axe injuries on their face.

=== Gonagala massacre ===
The Gonagala Massacre was a massacre that occurred on September 18, 1999, in the small village of Gonagala, located in the Ampara District of Sri Lanka. According to reports, over 50 men, women and children were hacked to death in the middle of the night. The massacre is attributed to the LTTE.

The Gonagala massacre is one of several such attacks believed to have been carried out by the LTTE. However these murders gained notoriety because, unlike previous attacks, most of the LTTE cadres who took part in it were women. According to survivors, there was a significant presence of female cadres among the 75 LTTE cadres who took part in the killings

== Controversy over the Army's handling of its casualties and their families ==
In August 2001, S. P. Thamilselvan, head of the LTTE's political wing, accused the Sri Lankan Army of failing to recover the bodies of nearly 1,000 soldiers killed in fighting since May, despite requests for the International Committee of the Red Cross (ICRC) to facilitate their recovery and return. He claimed that the Army had accepted only 55 bodies for return to their families, while leaving hundreds of others on the battlefield. Thamilselvan also acknowledged that some bodies remained in minefields where recovery operations posed a danger. Sri Lankan military spokesman Brigadier Sanath Karunaratne rejected the LTTE's allegations as propaganda intended to demoralise the families of missing soldiers. He explained that the Army could not always retrieve bodies when doing so risked further casualties among its personnel..

Similar difficulties had arisen during earlier attempts to establish the fate of missing servicemen. In April 2003, relatives of 619 soldiers reported missing following a battle on 27 September 1998 travelled to the battlefield with permission from the LTTE, after previous inquiries to the Ministry of Defence, the Army and the ICRC had failed to establish their whereabouts. According to accounts given by the families, they discovered approximately 500 bodies that had allegedly been gathered, doused with kerosene and burned by the Army. Following their return, legal proceedings were initiated on behalf of the families, seeking a mass funeral and DNA testing to identify the remains so that relatives could arrange religiously appropriate burials.

== Killing of prisoners by the LTTE ==
Although it had stated that it abides by the Third Geneva Convention for the treatment of prisoners of war, it has been accused of mass execution and torture of captured soldiers in the Battle of Mullaitivu and in the Battle of Vavunathivu.

== See also ==
- Phases of the Sri Lankan Civil War
- Eelam War I
- Eelam War II
- Eelam War IV
- Sri Lankan Civil War
