= Captain Miller (Tamil militant) =

Sri Lankan LTTE rebel

- மில்லர்
- Born: Vallipuram Vasanthan; 1 January 1966
- Died: 5 July 1987 (aged 21); Nelliady, Sri Lanka
- Years active: 1983–1987
- Organization: Liberation Tigers of Tamil Eelam
- Known for: First Black Tiger

Vallipuram Vasanthan (Tamil: வல்லிப்புரம் வசந்தன்; 1 January 1966 – 5 July 1987), commonly known by the nom de guerre Captain Miller, was a Sri Lankan Tamil member of the Liberation Tigers of Tamil Eelam (LTTE), a separatist Tamil militant organisation in Sri Lanka. He was the LTTE's first Black Tiger.

== Early life ==
Vasanthan was born on 1 January 1966. He was from Thunnalai in northern Sri Lanka. He was the son of a bank manager and had two siblings. He was educated at Hartley College in Point Pedro.

== LTTE ==
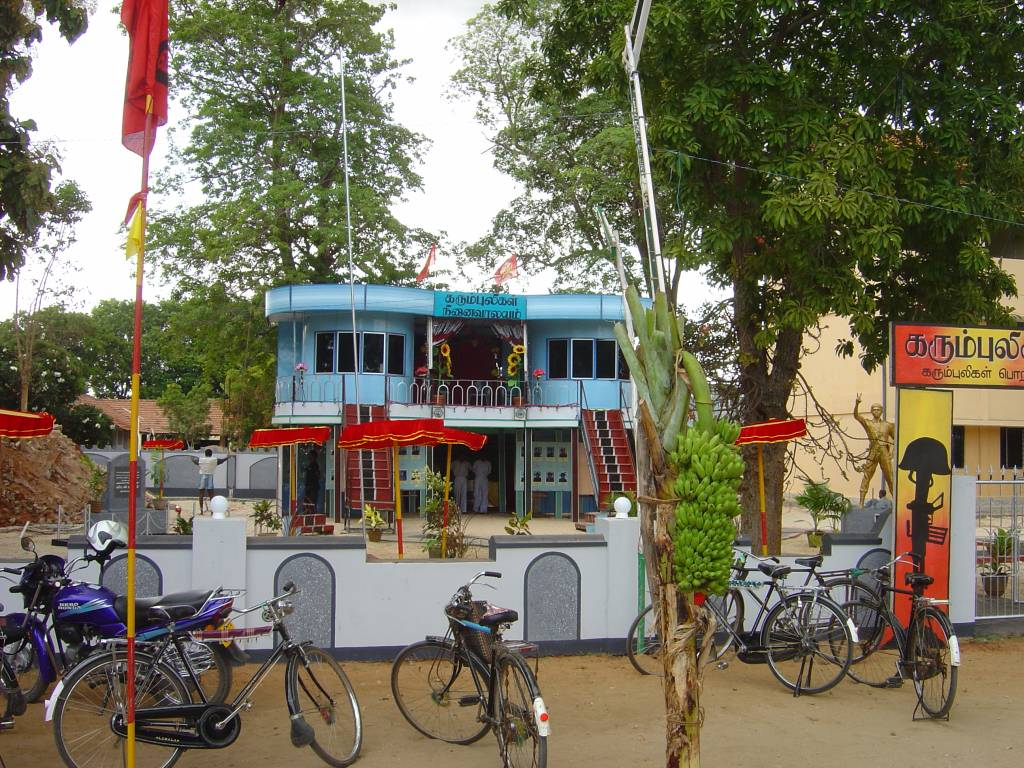
Captain Miller shrine at Nelliady Madhya Maha Vidyalayam on Black Tigers Day, 2004.

Disturbed by the Black July anti-Tamil riots, Vasanthan joined the militant Liberation Tigers of Tamil Eelam in 1983 as a driver. He became a full time member of the LTTE a year later. He was given the nom de guerre Miller (Millar).

During the Vadamarachchi Operation (Operation Liberation) the Sri Lanka Army took over Nelliady Madhya Maha Vidyalayam and turned it into a military base. The LTTE resolved to capture the base which was heavily reinforced and surrounded by barbed wire. Miller volunteered to drive a bomb filled vehicle into the heart of the base. Miller visited his family on 29 June 1987 and treated them and his friends to ice cream. On 5 July 1987, during the Battle of Nelliady, the LTTE filled a truck with explosives and wedged Miller's body into the driver's seat so that he couldn't move even if he wanted to. His hands were tied to the steering wheel and one foot to the accelerator. Fellow LTTE cadres started the truck which started moving. Miller steered the explosive filled truck into the army camp at Nelliady Madhya Maha Vidyalayam. Miller was most likely killed at the first barricades when soldiers opened fire but the truck kept going, ramming into the main school building and exploding. The explosion created a crater as big as a bus. Other LTTE cadres who were following Miller's truck launched an attack on the camp and captured it. Scores of soldiers were killed and wounded. (Note: Estimates of the number of soldiers killed at Nelliady Madhya Maha Vidyalayam vary – 17, 18, 20, 30, 40, 55.)

The incident was videotaped and Miller was posthumously promoted to captain. He became a revered figure in the LTTE and his face was on the insignia of the Black Tigers, the LTTE's suicide wing. 5 July became Karumpuli Naal (Black Tigers Day), a day for supporters of LTTE to commemorate Black Tiger suicide bombers. A shrine, including a golden statue of Miller, was built at Nelliady Madhya Maha Vidyalayam. After the Sri Lankan military re-captured the Vadamarachchi region in 1996 they destroyed Miller's shrine but locals managed to save and hide his statue. The statue and new memorial plaque were re-installed in 2002 during the Norwegian mediated Cease Fire Agreement. After war resumed, Miller's statue was attacked and destroyed by armed men on 23 August 2006. The remnants of the shrine – the dais on which Miller's statue stood and stone memorial plaque – were destroyed by the army on 4 July 2010.

== In popular culture ==
His name inspired the title of a Tamil movie released in 2024 starring Dhanush; however, the movie is not about the real Captain Miller, but rather a fictional soldier-turned-rebel who fights against the British Raj in the 1930s.
