= Kilinochchi railway station =

Railway station in Kilinochchi, Sri Lanka

Kilinochchi railway station கிளிநொச்சி කිලිනොච්චි දුම්රිය ස්ථානය
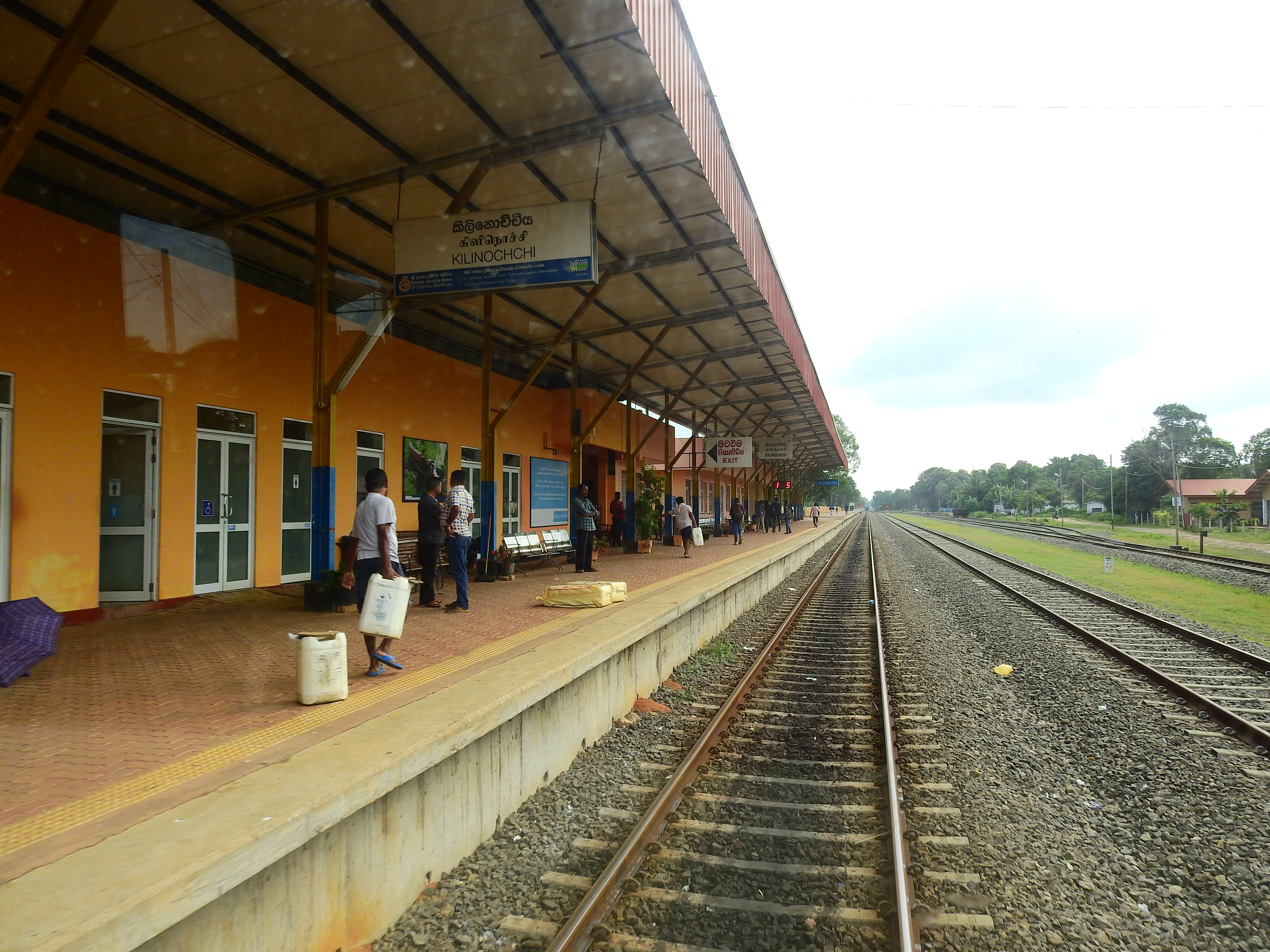

General information
- Location: Kilinochchi; Sri Lanka
- Coordinates: 9°23′25.40″N 80°24′23.70″E
- System: Sri Lankan Railway Station
- Owner: Sri Lanka Railways
- Line: Northern Line

Other information
- Status: Functioning

History
- Rebuilt: 14 September 2013

Services
Preceding station	Sri Lanka Railways	Following station
Murukandy toward Colombo Fort	Yal Devi; Northern Line	Paranthan toward Kankesanthurai
Location
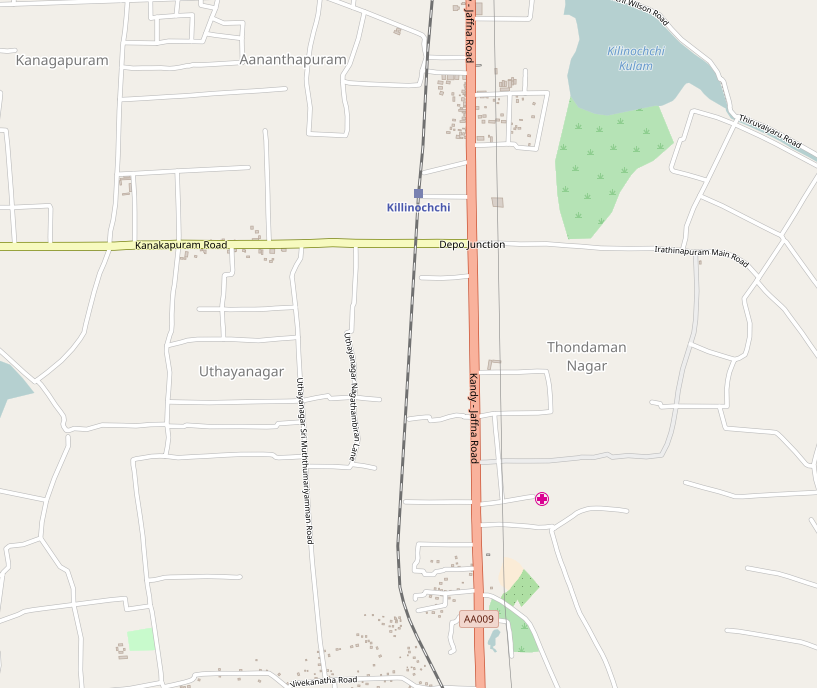
- Location within Central Kilinochchi

Kilinochchi railway station (Tamil: கிளிநொச்சி தொடருந்து நிலையம் Kiḷinocci toṭaruntu nilaiyam, Sinhala: කිලිනොච්චි දුම්රිය ස්ථානය) is a railway station in the town of Kilinochchi in northern Sri Lanka. Owned by Sri Lanka Railways, the state-owned railway operator, the station is part of the Northern Line which links the north with the capital Colombo. The popular Yal Devi service calls at the station. The station was not functioning between 1990 and 2013 due to the civil war. The Northern Line between Omanthai and Kilinochchi was re-opened on 14 September 2013.
