= 55 Division (Sri Lanka) =

- Active: 1996 - Present
- Country: Sri Lanka
- Branch: Sri Lanka Army
- Type: Infantry Division
- Part of: Security Forces Headquarters - Jaffna (SFHQ-J)
- Garrison/HQ: Elephant Pass Military Base
- Engagements: Sri Lankan Civil War
- Website: 55 Division

Commanders
- Current commander: Major General WMAB Wijekoon

The 55 Division is an elite division of the Sri Lanka Army. A principal offensive division it is currently deployed for combat operations in the Jaffna Peninsula and is under the command of Security Forces Headquarters - Jaffna.

== Current formation ==
- 55-1 Brigade
- 55-2 Brigade
- 55-3 Brigade

== Sri Lankan civil war ==
=== Towns captured by 55 Division ===
#	Area Liberated	Date
1	Battle of Chalai	5 February 2009
