= Third Battle of Elephant Pass =

2009 Sri Lankan Civil War battle

- Part of the Sri Lankan civil war
Date	5-9 January, 2009
Location	Elephant Pass, Sri Lanka
Result	Sri Lankan Army victory

Belligerents
Sri Lanka	Liberation Tigers of Tamil Eelam

Commanders and leaders
(Sri Lanka) Mahinda Rajapaksha; Sarath Fonseka	Velupillai Prabhakaran

Units involved
Sri Lanka Armed Forces; Sri Lanka Army	Liberation Tigers of Tamil Eelam

In the Third Battle of Elephant Pass, Elephant Pass was recaptured from the Tamil Tigers by the armed forces of the Sri Lankan Army.

Mahinda Rajapaksa, the president of Sri Lanka, declared that Elephant Pass was captured by the army on January 9, 2009.

== Conflict ==
The base was overrun by the LTTE at the end of the Second Battle of Elephant Pass during the third Eelam War. The base was a stronghold for LTTE until it was recaptured.
