= Nelliady Madhya Maha Vidyalayam =

Nelliady Central College.
- நெல்லியடி மத்திய கல்லூரி.

Location
- Nelliady, Jaffna District, Northern Province; Sri Lanka
- Coordinates: 9°48′12.20″N 80°12′10.70″E

Information
- School type: Public provincial 1AB
- Founded: 1921
- School district: Vadamarachchi Education Zone
- Authority: Northern Provincial Council
- School number: 1008001
- Principal: G.Krishnakumar
- Teaching staff: 120
- Grades: 1-13
- Gender: Mixed
- Age range: 5-18

Nelliady Central College (Tamil: நெல்லியடி மத்திய கல்லூரி Nelliyaṭi Mattiya kalloori, also known as Nelliady Madhya Maha Vidyalayam) is a national school in Nelliady, Sri Lanka.

== History ==
The school was founded in 1921. It was promoted to Madhya Maha Vidyalayam status in 1946. The school, like most schools in the north and east of Sri Lanka, was severely affected by the Sri Lankan Civil War. The school was the site of Sri Lanka's first suicide attack on 5 July 1987 when Captain Miller drove a small truck laden with explosives into the Sri Lankan Army camp at the school.

== See also ==
- List of schools in Northern Province, Sri Lanka
