= Pallai =

Town in the Northern Province, Sri Lanka

Pallai பளை පල්ලෙයි
- Village
- Location within Sri Lanka
- Coordinates: 09°36′00″N 80°19′00″E
- Country: Sri Lanka
- Province: Northern Province
- District: Kilinochchi
- Divisional Secretariat: Pachchilaipalli
- Elevation: 11.0 m (36.1 ft)
- Time zone: UTC+5:30 (Sri Lanka Standard Time Zone)
- Postal Code: 42550

Pallai (Tamil: பளை, Sinhala: පල්ලෙයි), also spelt Palai, is a small town in the Kilinochchi District, Northern Province, Sri Lanka. The town is located under the division of the Pachilaipally Divisional Secretary and is administered by the Pachilaipally Pradeshiya Sabha.

It is located near the coast on the northern peninsula, approximately 40 kilometres (25 mi) south-east of Jaffna.

In 1861 the Church Mission Society sent Rev. John Backus to Pallai to establish a Christian community in the town. This led to the construction and dedication of St. Andrew's Church on 30 November 1895.

In 1921 the government declared a 4.25 square kilometres (2 sq mi) area adjacent to the town as a forest reserve.

== Transport ==
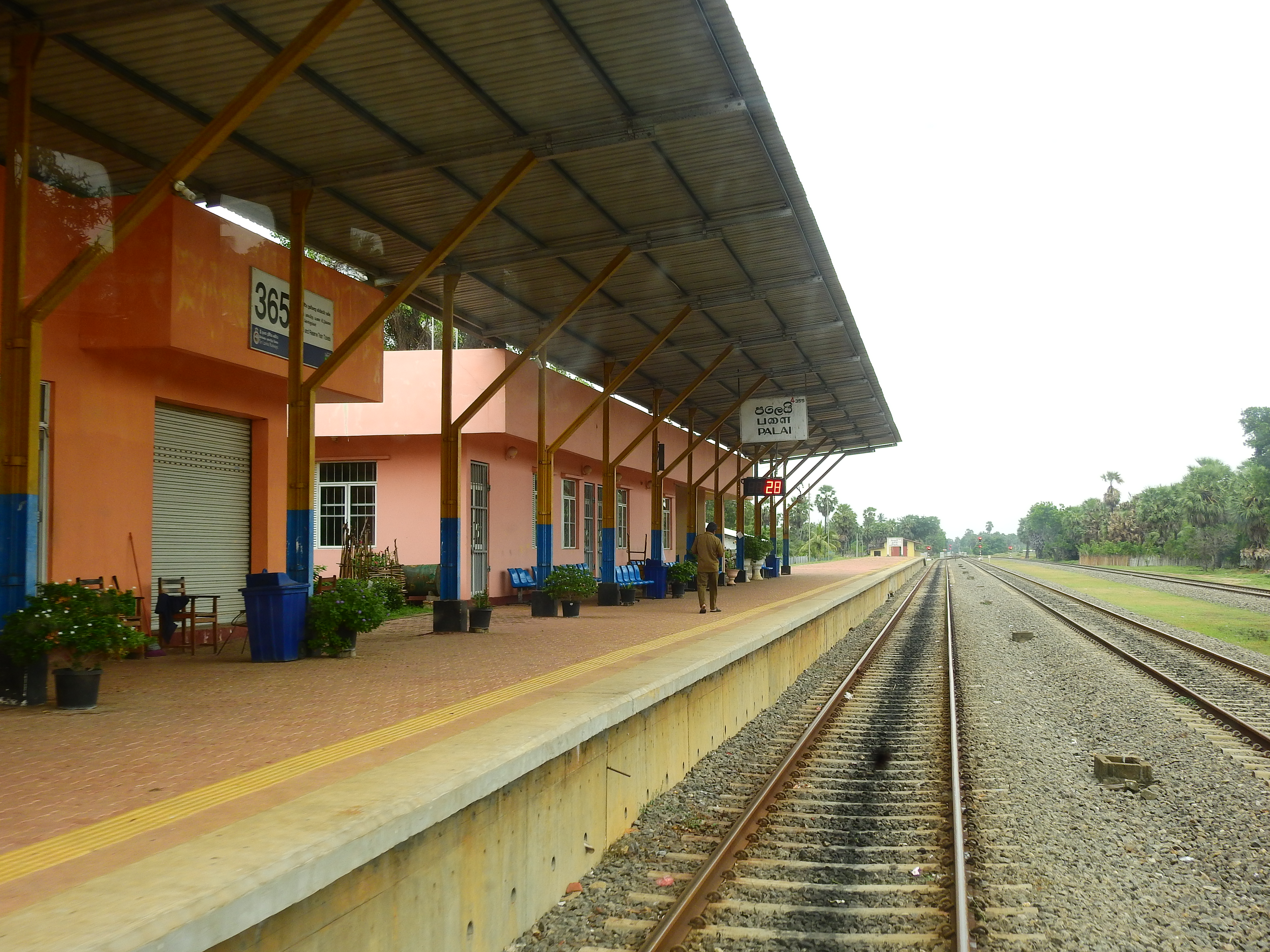
The railway station in December 2019.

Pallai is located on the (A9) Kandy-Jaffna Highway.

It is served by a railway station on the national network which was out of use due to war damage. In 2009, agreements were made to restore the line back into service. The railway resumed operation on 4 March 2014.

== See also ==
- Railway stations in Sri Lanka
- Pallai railway station
