= Nelliady =

Town in Jaffna District, Sri Lanka

Nelliady நெல்லியடி නෙල්ලිඅඩි
- Town
- Location within Northern Province
- Coordinates: 9°48′0″N 80°12′0″E
- Country: Sri Lanka
- Province: Northern
- District: Jaffna
- DS Division: Vadamarachchi South‐West

Nelliady is a town in Jaffna District, Sri Lanka. It is one of the busiest towns in Jaffna district.

After many coastal areas of Sri Lanka were devastated by the 2004 Indian Ocean earthquake and tsunami many people settled further inland, in towns including Nelliady.

Nelliady is also known as the place where the LTTE's first Black Tiger Captain Miller drove an explosive laden truck on Sri Lanka Army (SLA) troops garrisoned at Nelliyadi Central College, killing himself and between 39 and 100 Sri Lankan soldiers on 5th July 1987.

== Etymology ==
In local Tamil Language, Nelliady (நெல்லியடி) translates to By the bottom of Indian gooseberry.

It is widely believed that Nelliady (நெல்லியடி) is a compound word derived from two words: 'Nelli' (நெல்லி) which is a type of plant/tree and 'Ady' (அடி) which is a locative suffix, meaning 'locality'. Hence, Nelliady (நெல்லியடி) can be translated as 'the locality of the Nelli tree'.

== Main spots ==
- Nelliady Public Market
- Nelliady Bus Stand
- Karaveddy Main Post Office
- Karaveddy Divisional Hospital

== Education ==
Schools in or near Nelliady include Nelliady Madhya Maha Vidyalayam (Nelliady Central College), Sacred Heart College, Vigneswara College, Uduppiddy American Mission College and Gnanasariyar College.

== Religion ==
- Tadangan Puliyadi Murugan Temple
- Pillayar Temple
- Kali Temple
- Gnana Vairavar Temple
- Kalayan Thoddam Sri Muththu Kumarasuvami
- St.Antony's Church

== See also ==
- Captain Miller
- Nelliyadi
- Indian gooseberry
