= Puthukkudiyiruppu (Mullaitivu) =

Puthukkudiyiruppu புதுக்குடியிருப்பு පුදුකුඩිඉරුප්පු
- Town
- Location within Northern Province
- Coordinates: 9°18′0″N 80°41′0″E
- Country: Sri Lanka
- Province: Northern
- District: Mullaitivu
- DS Division: Puthukkudiyiruppu

Puthukkudiyiruppu (Tamil: புதுக்குடியிருப்பு, Sinhala: පුදුකුඩිඉරුප්පු) is a small town in the Mullaitivu District of Sri Lanka.

There are four main roads which lead to Mullaithivu in the east, Paranthan towards the west, Iranaipalai towards the north and Oddusuddan towards the south.

Most of the villagers are farmers and there is a significant proportion that fish.

In the 1990s there was a massive influx of people from Jaffna District. The small, two-ward government dispensary became one of the main hospitals in Mullaitivu district.

== History ==
Until it was declared as a separate DRO (Divisional Revenue Division), it was under Mullaithivu. Subsequently, when it was declared as a separate DRO division Mr Amirthalingam became the first DRO. Later it became the Divisional Secretary division with the administrative reforms.

Being mainly a farming community, the structure of houses were unique until about 1960s. The houses usually consisted of four blocks. There was a main lounge with half walls, a closed block with one door which was used as the bedroom, a kitchen and a store house for paddy.

The town was mostly destroyed during fighting between government troops and LTTE in 2009.

== Schools ==
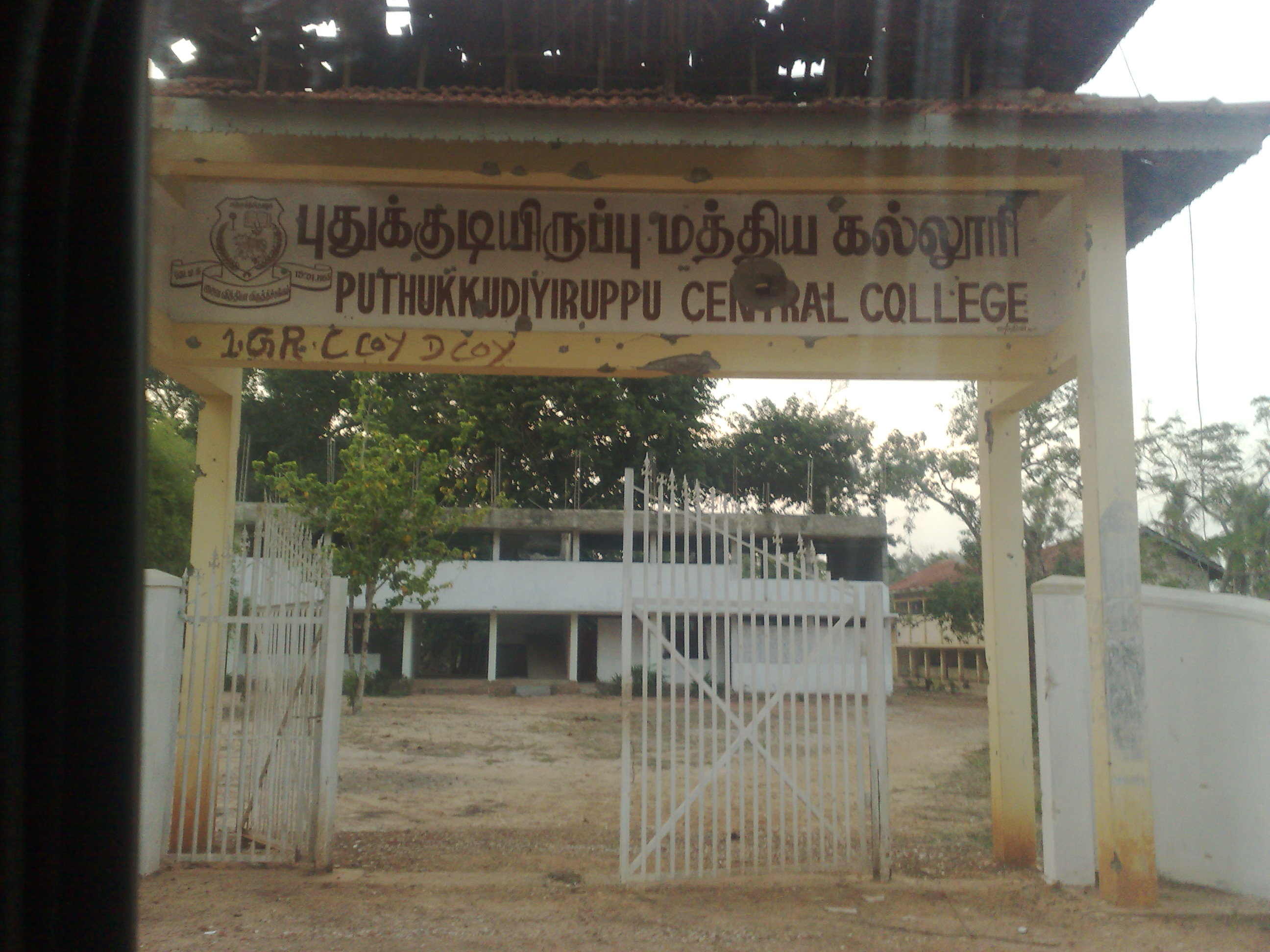
Puthukkudiyiruppu Central College in 2009

1. Sri Subramanya Vidyalayam ( Earlier it was known as "Church of Ceylon Tamil Mixed School")
2. Puthukkudiyiruppu Central college ( Earlier it was known as "Puthukkudiyiruppu Mahavidyalayam")
3. Roman Catholic School
4. Vikneswara Vidyalayam

== Temples ==
1. Shri Kandhaswamy Temple
2. Ulagalantha Vinayagar Temple
3. Sivanagar Sivan Temple
4. Sri Muthumaariyamman Temple
5. Kaaddamanakku Vinayagar Temple
6. Sri Thurkai amman Temple
7. Arasadi pillayaar Temple
8. Mahavishnu Temple
