= Elephant Pass =

Place in Northern Province, Sri Lanka

- Isthmus
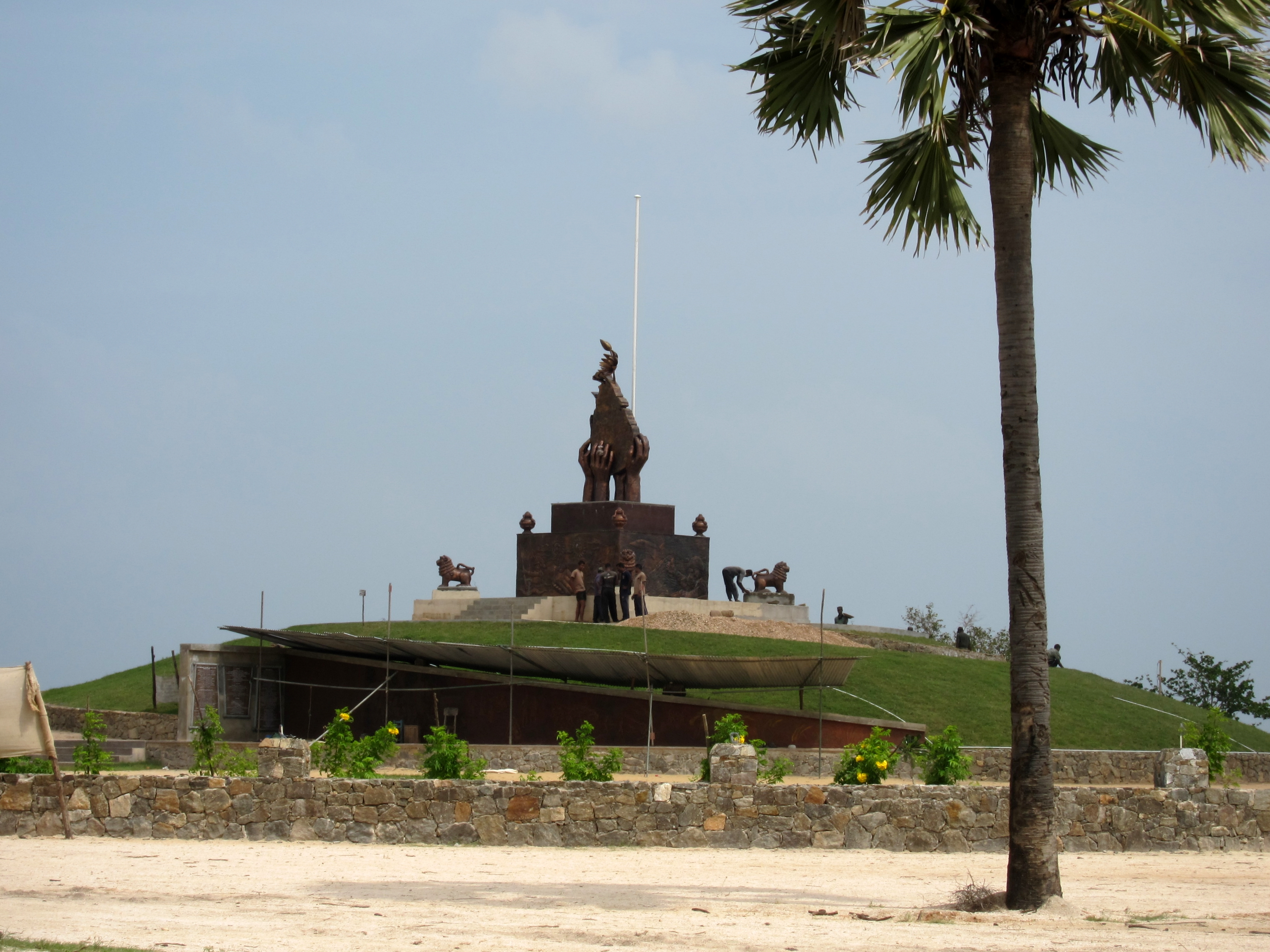
- Elephant Pass Memorial
- Interactive map of Elephant Pass
- Coordinates: 9.5060°N 80.4067°E
- Location: Jaffna Peninsula, Northern Province, Sri Lanka
- Water bodies: Jaffna Lagoon

Elephant Pass (Tamil: ஆனையிறவு, romanized: Āṉaiyiṟavu; Sinhala: අලිමංකඩ, romanized: Alimankada) is a region located at the gateway of the Jaffna Peninsula in the Northern Province, Sri Lanka. It lies about 340 km north of the capital. It has an important military base and used to be the island's largest salt field. It was regularly the site of battles during the Sri Lankan civil war.

== Strategic importance ==
Elephant Pass controls access to the Jaffna Peninsula, therefore it is referred to as the Gateway to Jaffna. It is very crucial as it is on the isthmus connecting the peninsula to the Sri Lankan mainland, and to territory in the Southern Jaffna peninsula. Elephant Pass connects the militarily significant town of Chavakacheri in the Jaffna peninsula to the Sri Lankan mainland.

== History ==
Elephant Pass is described by Indian author Kalki Krishnamurthy in his Tamil language novel Ponniyin Selvan. Elephant Pass has been a strategic military base since 1760, when the Portuguese built a fort in the area, which was later rebuilt and garrisoned by the Dutch in 1776 and later the British. A modern military base was built in Elephant Pass by the Sri Lankan Army (SLA) in 1952. At a certain point, the base and its outlying camps expanded to cover an area 23 kilometres (14 mi) long and 8 kilometres (5.0 mi) wide.

=== During the Sri Lankan Civil War ===
The base remained under SLA control until 2000, despite repeated attempts to capture the base by the Liberation Tigers of Tamil Eelam (LTTE, also known as the Tamil Tigers). In the First Battle of Elephant Pass in 1991, the LTTE suffered heavy losses while trying to capture the base. The base was used as a springboard for a number of SLA offensives during the 1990s, including Operation Yal Devi (named after the Colombo–Jaffna train) in September 1993 and Operation Sath Jaya (Truth's Victory) in July 1996.

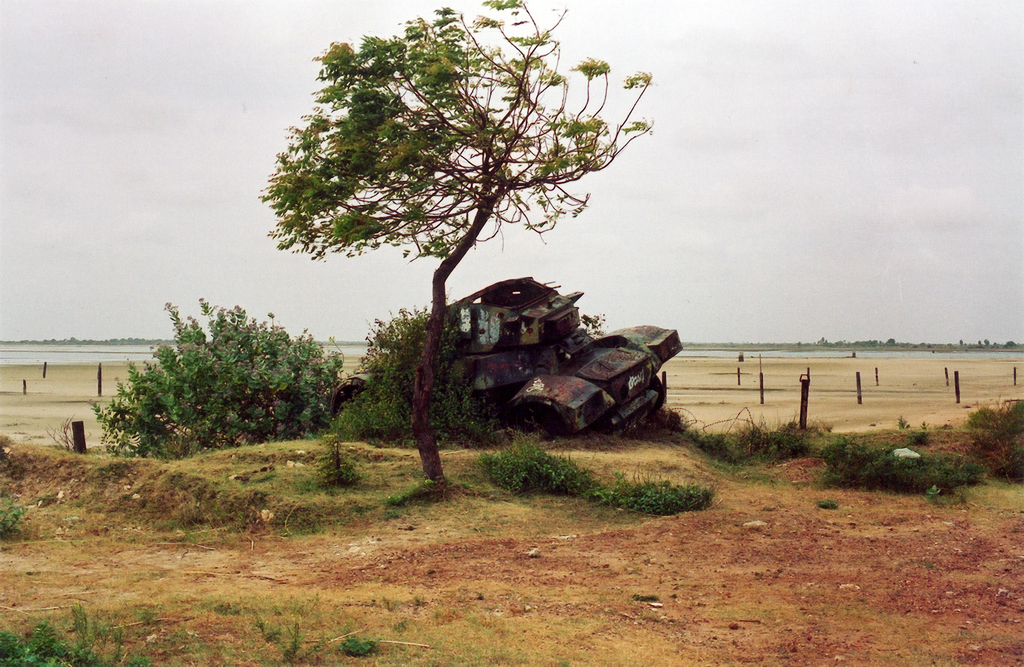
Daimler Armoured Car rusting by a tree in the area around Elephant Pass

However, in a major military defeat, the Sri Lankan Army lost control of Elephant Pass to the LTTE on 22 April 2000 in the Second Battle of Elephant Pass. The pass was eventually recaptured by Sri Lankan Army in the Third Battle of Elephant Pass in 2009, as part of a campaign that led to military defeat of the Tamil Tigers.

=== Post-war developments ===
Before the war, the Elephant Pass saltern produced 60,000–80,000 metric tons of salt production per annum and supplied 30–40% of the total salt requirement of the country. However, due to the civil war, saltern operations were abandoned in 1990. Since the liberation of the area by Sri Lankan military forces, the government has shown interest in rebuilding the salterns in the area, due to its immense potential for exporting salt. De-mining in the area has been completed by Delvon Assistance for Social Harmony (DASH) with the support of the Australian Government.

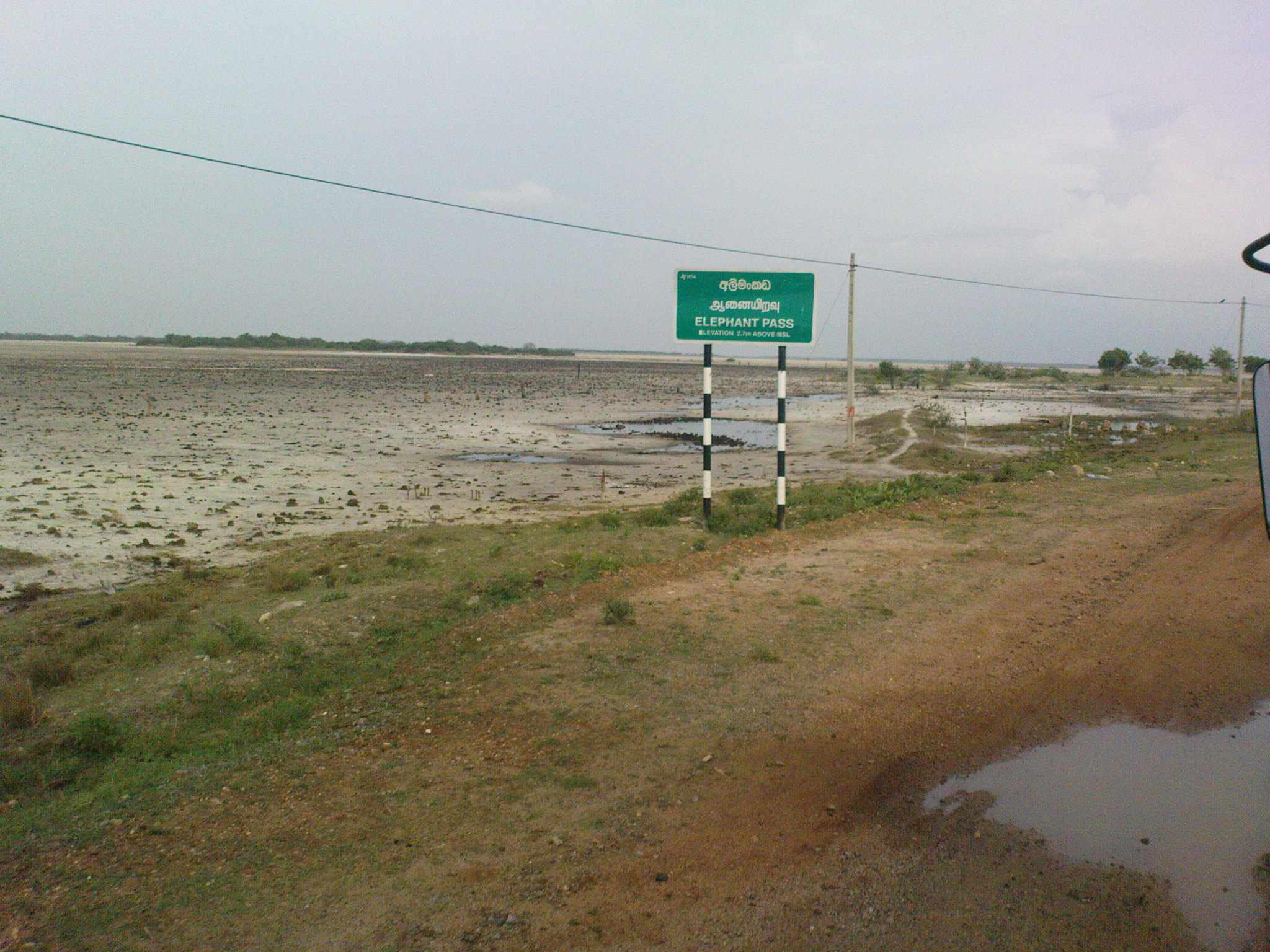
Chundikkulam Lagoon, often referred as Elephant Pass Lagoon

Under the phase I programme which covered 330 acres, it was expected that the reactivation of phase I would lead to a production of 20,000–25,000 metric tons per annum of salt production. The second phase of the Elephant Pass saltern of 447 acres commenced in 2015 and is expected to be funded under Treasury funds. An additional 30,000 metric tons are expected and the total employment opportunities generated will be over 3,000. After completing the entire infrastructure development of the saltern, it is envisaged that the salt production will be around 70,000 to 100,000 metric tons of salt per annum. Under the reactivation of Elephant Pass Saltern Project, the construction of sea water intake canal, renovation of reservoir outer earth bunds, rip rap protection of reservoir, renovation of flood protection earth bunds, construction of spillways, electrification, renovation of buildings and purchase of tractors and trailers, tools and accessories are being carried out.

In 2016, Elephant Pass railway station, which was destroyed by the LTTE during the war, was rebuilt with the help of students and teachers from across the country as well as the Ministry of Education.

== Transport ==
- Elephant Pass railway station

== See also ==
- Place names in Sri Lanka
- Elephant Pass Fort
- The Road from Elephant Pass
