= List of Archaeological Protected Monuments in Mullaitivu District =

This is a list of Archaeological Protected Monuments in Mullaitivu District, Sri Lanka.

Monument	Image	Location	Grama Niladhari Division	Divisional Secretary's Division	Registered	Description	Refs
Alankulam ruins		Near 65th Brigade HQ	Alankulam	Thunukkai	25 March 2016	Ruins of stupa	
Ambalaperumal Lake ruins		Uyilankulam	Koddaikaddiyakulam	Thunukkai	25 March 2016	Ruined buildings and dagoba	
Ambalavikulam ruins		Palaiyamurukandy	Palaiyamurukandy	Thunukkai	25 March 2016		
Iddamaduwa ruins		Iddamaduwa	Thanduvan	Oddusuddan	25 March 2016	Ruins of buildings with stone pillars	
Janakapura ruins		Behind Janakapura New School	Janakapura	Weli Oya	25 March 2016	Ruins with stone pillars	
Kalikkadu ruins		Kalikkadu	Mulliyawalai Centre	Maritimepattu	12 June 2015	Ruins of buildings with ancient stone pillars	
Kalvilan ruins		Kalvilan	Kalvilan	Thunukkai	17 May 2013	Hillock covering ancient stupa	
Kalvilan ruins		Kalvilan	Kalvilan	Thunukkai	25 March 2016	Ruins with stone pillars	
Kanesapuram ruins		Kanesapuram	Kanesapuram	Oddusuddan	25 March 2016	Stone pillar and stone pond	
Kanniyar Kovil ruins		Mannakandal	Mannakandal	Puthukudiyiruppu	25 March 2016	Buddhist arama complex ruins with hillock of chaitya and stone pillar	
Karambakadu Samanankulam ruins		Karambakadu Samanankulam	Karambakadu Samanankulam	Oddusuddan	25 March 2016	Ruins of buildings with stone pillars	
Keridamadu ruins		Keridamadu	Mannakandal	Puthukudiyiruppu	17 May 2013		
Kokavil ruins		Near Kokavil transmission tower	Thirumurukandy	Oddusuddan	17 May 2013		
Kulammurippu ruins		Kulammurippu	Kulammurippu	Oddusuddan	25 March 2016	Hillock of chaitya and ruins	
Kulamottai ruins		Ampakamam Kulamottai	Ampakamam	Oddusuddan	12 June 2015	Ruins with stone wall and hillock of ruins	
Kumarapuram Sri Chithravelaudam; Murugan Kovil ruins		Kumarapuram	Kumarapuram	Maritimepattu	17 May 2013	Ruins with stone pillars	
Kurundhi Raja Maha Vihara							
Marandakulam ruins		Puththuvedduvan	Puththuvedduvan	Thunukkai	25 March 2016	Ruins with stone pillars	
Mullaitivu fort		Mullaitivu	Mullaitivu Town	Maritimepattu	25 March 2016	Dutch fortress	
Muththaiyankaddu ruins		Army Training School	Muththaiyankaddu Kulam	Oddusuddan	25 March 2016	Ancient dagoba, shrine and other ruins	
Muththaiyankaddu Lake ruins		Muththaiyankaddu Kulam	Muththaiyankaddu Kulam	Oddusuddan	25 March 2016		
Nagathambran Kovil ruins		Kollavalamkulam	Palinagar	Manthai East	17 May 2013	Hillock covering ancient stupa, ruins and base stone	
Naiththikkaikulam ruins		Naiththikkaikulam	Kumulamunai Centre	Maritimepattu	25 March 2016	Ruins with hillock of chaitya	
Nayaru dagoba		Kiriibbanwewa	Kiriibbanwewa Left	Weli Oya	25 March 2016		
Paleppani ruins		Paleppani	Vannivilankulam	Manthai East	17 May 2013		
Pandara Vanniyan monument		Kachchilamadu	Kachchilamadu	Oddusuddan	25 March 2016		
Pandara Vanniyan ruins		Kachchilamadu	Kachchilamadu	Oddusuddan	12 June 2015		
Peraru		Peraru	Peraru	Oddusuddan	12 June 2015	Ancient settlement	
Peraru ruins		Peraru	Peraru	Oddusuddan	12 June 2015	Ruins of buildings with stone pillars	
Periyathehilamkulam ruins		Paleppani	Vannivilankulam	Manthai East	17 May 2013		
Pulumachchinadakulam Lake ruins		Pulumachchinadakulam		Oddusuddan	25 March 2016	Dagoba and ruins	
Puththuvedduvan ruins		Puththuvedduvan	Puththuvedduvan	Thunukkai	25 March 2016		
Thaddayamalai ruins		Thaddayamalai	Thaddayamalai	Oddusuddan	25 March 2016		
Thaddayamalai ruins		Thaddayamalai	Thaddayamalai	Oddusuddan	25 March 2016	Two rocks with the ruined dagoba and remains of buildings	
Thenniyankulam ruins		Thenniyankulam	Thenniyankulam	Thunukkai	25 March 2016		
Udiyakuruppukulam Lake ruins		Ambakamam	Thachchadampan	Oddusuddan	25 March 2016	Arama complex ruins	
Uyilankulam Niraviya ruins		Niraviya	Uyilankulam	Thunukkai	25 March 2016	Ruined buildings and dagoba	
Vellakulam ruins		Vellakulam		Oddusuddan	25 March 2016	Arama complex ruins	
Vinayagapuram ruins		Vinayagapuram	Pandiyankulam	Manthai East	17 May 2013	Hillock with ruins and base stones located in paddy fields	
Walandakare ruins		Walandakare	Iyankankulam	Thunukkai	12 June 2015	Dagobas and ruins	
