= 1985 Trincomalee massacres =

Attacks on Tamil civilians by Sri Lankan military and home guards

- Location of Sri Lanka
- Location: Various locations in Trincomalee District, Eastern Province, Sri Lanka
- Date: May–June 1985 and August-September 1985
- Target: Tamil civilians
- Attack type: Mass murder, ethnic cleansing, pogrom
- Deaths: Hundreds
- Injuries: Unknown
- Perpetrators: Sri Lankan military, Sri Lankan Home Guards, Sinhalese mobs
- Motive: Ethnic cleansing

The 1985 Trincomalee massacres were a series of mass murders of Tamil civilians by the Sri Lankan military and Sinhalese home guards in Trincomalee District, Sri Lanka. In a succession of events that spanned over two months starting in late May 1985, hundreds of Tamil civilians were massacred and thousands were driven out by the Sri Lankan military and Sinhalese mobs in order to colonize the area. Almost every Tamil settlement in the district was destroyed during this well-orchestrated campaign to drive out the local Tamil population. (Note: "After five days, the carnage ended for rather cynical, but very practical reasons: 'further destruction on such a scale was brought to an end because there was little else to destroy in the Trincomalee District.'") Several Tamil women were also raped. In September 1985, the entire Tamil population of Trincomalee town was displaced to forests and refugee camps in an attack that wiped out the town, including the destruction of 12 Hindu temples and a mosque. Since August 16, over 50,000 Tamils who were forced to flee the town ended up in refugee camps in the Jaffna and Batticaloa districts.

== Background ==
Since the 1930s, the Sinhalese-dominated state settled Sinhalese in the predominantly Tamil-speaking Eastern Province, claiming to restore lost ancient Sinhalese civilization, as well as to undermine the Tamils' claim to local autonomy. In Trincomalee District, this policy led to its share of the Tamil population being reduced from 64.8% in 1881 to 33.7% by 1981. Trincomalee town known for its harbour was also a strategically important area, contested between Tamils and Sinhalese, with Tamil militants claiming it as the capital of their proposed state of Tamil Eelam. The Sri Lankan state saw the Sinhalisation of Trincomalee as the key to breaking the territorial contiguity between the Tamil areas of the north and east.

In 1983, Trincomalee was the site of anti-Tamil violence at the hands of Sinhalese mobs and security forces who also evicted resettled plantation Tamils from there. With the start of the Sri Lankan civil war in 1983, Sinhalese settlements came to be part of the military strategy against Tamil militants to destroy the territorial base of Tamil Eelam. By late 1984, thousands of Tamil families in Mullaitivu District and in the northernmost village of Trincomalee were driven out by the army. In early 1985, Sinhalese settlers including in Trincomalee were provided firearms and training which were denied to Tamil farmers. Leading up to the 1985 Trincomalee violence, the army massacred Tamils in Valvettithurai which sparked the LTTE massacre of Sinhalese in Anuradhapura.

== List of attacks ==
Following is an incomplete list containing records of only reported and known attacks based on the availability of data.

=== May ===
==== May 3 ====
On May 3, 50 Tamil people were killed by the Sri Lankan military and Sinhalese mobs in Dehiwatte and Mahindapura. Tamil inhabitants of these villages were ethnically cleansed and Sinhalese settlers took their places.

==== May 23 ====
The Army and the newly inducted Sinhalese home guards commenced attacks on outlying Tamil villages in the Trincomalee District, in Nilaveli on 23 May 1985 and in the Allai settlement scheme south of Mutur the next day. Eight civilians were shot dead by the military in Nilaveli on 23.05.1985.

==== May 24 ====
Sinhalese home guards from Dehiwatte killed two Tamil civilians from Kankuveli.

More than ten people from Anpuvalipuram, who had gone in search of firewood never returned home. Their bulls and carts were found later. And their deaths were attributed to the home guards or the military.

==== May 25 ====
11 civilians are shot dead in Pankulam village, and houses of the residents burnt down. A father and his 12-year-old son who were travelling to visit their family in the nearby village of Kankuveli were hacked to death by the Sinhalese home guards. Their bodies were disposed at the Kankuveli tank.

==== May 26 ====
Over 40 houses and property belonging to Tamils in Echchilampattu were set on fire. Two civilians were killed. On the same day, several fishermen from the district were shot dead by the Sri Lankan Navy while they were fishing. Bodies of three fishermen were recovered.

==== May 27 ====
On 27 May 1985, a bus belonging to the State bus service CTB, was stopped at 52nd Milepost in Mahindapura and 6 of its passengers and its driver Pushparaja, all Tamils, were killed in cold blood and their bodies burnt by Sinhala mobs assisted by the home guards.

==== May 31 ====
On the night of 31 May a police party with home guards took away 37 Tamils from the south bank of Killiveddy and were massacred and burnt at Sambalpiddy. Later that night, a group of suspected TELO militants killed five Sinhalese at Dehiwatte, who were civilians according to Rajan Hoole and home guards according to T. Sabaratnam. It was played up in the national press.

=== June ===
==== June 1 ====
Government forces and Sinhalese mobs burned down 125 houses in Kilivetti, killing 10 Tamils. 8 Tamil men and 5 Tamil women were then taken to Dehiwatte, where the men were executed and the women raped.

==== June 3 ====
A bus carrying 13 Tamils was burned in Trincomalee. Mr. A. Thangathurai, a former Member of Parliament, was the only survivor and witness of the incident.

==== June 3 and 4 ====
Every single Tamil village close to a Sinhala colony in the Allai Extension Scheme was destroyed by government forces and Sinhalese mobs:

"The villages of Kilivetti, Menkamam, Sivapuram, Kankuveli, Pattitidal, Palaththadichenai, Arippu, Poonagar, Mallikaithivu, Peruveli, Munnampodivattai, Manalchenai, Bharatipuram, Lingapuram, Eechchilampattai, Karukkamunai, Mavadichchenai, Muttuchenai and Valaithottam were razed to the ground by a looting and plundering mob of Sinhala soldiers, policemen, home guards, and ordinary civilians. Over 80 people were reportedly killed, and 200 disappeared. Estimates of the number of houses destroyed vary between 'more than 1000' and 3,500."

==== June 5 ====
On 5 June 1985, an air force helicopter flew over Thiriyai, the surviving northernmost Tamil village in Trincomalee District, firing at residents (Amarivayal and Thennamaravady villages had been uprooted seven months earlier). Air Force personnel then came in trucks with explosives and set fire to 700 houses. People who remained took refuge in the local school.

==== June 13 ====
Nine hundred houses belonging to Tamils at Kattaiparichchan, Sampur, Chenaiyur and Muthur were burned down by government forces.

On June 18, the government declared a three-month ceasefire, partially calming the situation.

=== August ===
==== August 10 ====
On 10 August 1985, the Army arrived again at Thiriyai and opened fire targeting some of the community leaders, killing among 10 persons, a principal and a village headman.

==== August 17 ====
Security forces enter Tamil houses in Trincomalee and shoot dead men, women and children. Some of the victims include Thiruchelvam (35), Manickam (60), Kangathevi (32), Manickam (65), Nageswari (40), Sasikala (1), Jeyanthi (12), Inpam (6), Sankar (10) and Ravindran (1).

=== September ===
The MP for Polonnaruwa H. G. P. Nelson and the MP for Seruvila were reported to have played a leading role in organising further violence against Tamils. 12,000 Sinhalese were armed and transported to Trincomalee for this purpose, many of whom were from the newly formed Sinhala colony of Sirimapura.

==== September 4 ====
The grocery shop of Supar Navaratnam was burned down at 9:10 AM by a mob of 20 armed Sinhalese men who shouted 'Para Demala' (foreign Tamil) and threw grenades and petrol bombs. 50 other Tamil shops in Trincomalee town were also burned down. At Murugapuri, Uppuveli, Sinhalese thugs and homeguards with the help of security forces looted and burned all the homes and shops of Tamils that they had attacked.

==== September 5 ====
Thousands of Tamils in Trincomalee fled their homes in fear as their homes were set ablaze during a curfew imposed by the government.

==== September 8 ====
Following days of anti-Tamil violence at Murugapuri, the dead bodies of S Sinnathurai (85), Navaratnam (50) and Menon (61) were found with cuts, gunshot and burn injuries.

==== September 9 ====
The last of the large-scale attacks was launched on Trincomalee town itself on 9 September 1985. Under cover provided by the Army, firing from the air by the Air Force and from the sea by naval gunboats, mainly Sinhalese home guards moved in to loot, burn and to kill. 25 civilians were killed and about 1500 houses and places of worship were destroyed.

==== September 11 ====
Anti-Tamil rioting continues in Trincomalee town.

==== September 12 ====
A Sinhalese mob with the help of armed police burn a Tamil temple in Trincomalee town.

==== September 16 ====
Over 15 Tamil civilians were killed. Dozens more were taken to army camps and reported to have been shot dead.

== See also ==
- List of attacks on civilians attributed to Sri Lankan government forces
- 1983 anti-Tamil pogrom in Trincomalee
- Role of the Sri Lankan Home Guards in the Sri Lankan Civil War
