= Weli Oya =

Weli Oya වැලිඔය மணலாறு
- Village
- Location within Northern Province
- Coordinates: 9°07′0″N 80°48′0″E
- Country: Sri Lanka
- Province: Northern
- District: Mullaithivu District
- DS Division: Weli Oya

Manal Aru,(Sinhala: වැලිඔය, romanized: Weli Oya) (Tamil: மணலாறு, romanized: Maṇalāṟu) is a Sinhalese colony area in Mullaithivu District, Sri Lanka formerly known as Manal Aru (Tamil name meaning Sand river). Weli Oya has been affected by the Sri Lankan civil war and government Sinhala colonization programs.

Weli Oya was traditionally known as Manal Aru before the launch of government Sinhala colonization programs and the 1984 Manal Aru massacres, where the Tamil population was progressively driven out. A body of running water moving to a lower level in a channel on land is called Manal Aru in Tamil. It is hemmed between Anuradhapura, Mullaitivu, Trincomalee and Vavuniya Districts. It is called the "border village" (s) since the territory north of Weli Oya was previously under the control of the Liberation Tigers of Tamil Eelam.

In 2012, there were 18 villages in Weli Oya, comprising 3,336 families and 11,189 people, over 99.77% being of Sinhalese ethnicity.

Religion in Welioya DS Division (2012)

Buddhists 6,843-99.12%, Roman Catholics 41-0.59%, Other Christians 12-0.17%, Hindus 5-0.07%, Islam 3-0.04%, Others 0-0.00%,

Total Population 6,904-100.00%.

== History ==
=== Manal Aru ===
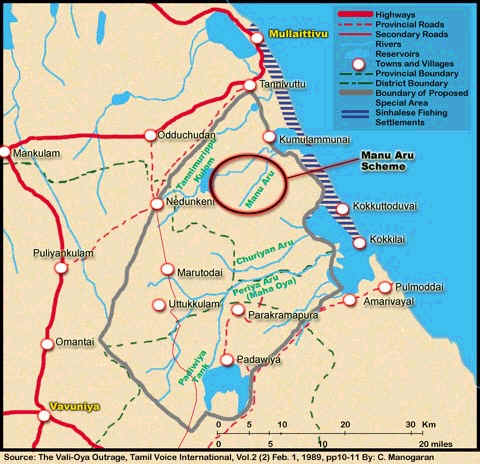
A typo on the map has Manal Aru written as Manu Aru in 1989

This area was known as Manal Aru. Manal in Tamil means sand, Aru in Tamil means river. A body of running water moving to a lower level in a channel on land is called Manal Aru in Tamil.

A total of 13,288 Tamil families were living in 42 villages for generations including Kokkulai Grama Sevakar Division (1516 Tamil families), Kokku –Thoduvai Grama Sevakar Division (3306 Tamil families), Vavunia North Grama Sevakar Division (1342 Tamil families), Other Divisions of Mullaitivu District including Naiyaru and Kumulamunai ( 2011 Tamil families). These Traditional Tamil farming villages interspersed with small and large farms owned by Tamils or held on long lease by Tamil-owned business enterprises. The lease for 99 years was granted by the government in 1965. The extent of individual holdings varied from ten to fifty acres. Business concerns held large farms and 16 of them were a thousand acres and more. Among the large farms were: Navalar farm, Ceylon Theatres farm, Kent farm, Railway Group Farm, Postmaster Group Farm and Dollar Farm.

=== Colonization in 1984 ===
After settlements inhabited by ethnic Sinhalese near Maduru Oya Basin in Vadamunai, Eastern Province began to encroach on state land creating a controversy the Sinhalese were ejected from the east and resettled along a line from Padaviya to Nedunkerny in the north, in the Mullaitivu district with jungles being cleared and new roads being opened from Padaviya to Dollar Farm, Kumbakarnan Malai, Ariyakundam, Kokkuchchankulam, Kokkuttoduwai and Veddukkan malai. The project was done with the resources and vehicles of the Army, Agrarian Services, Illmenite Corporation, Tobacco Corporation and Petroleum Corporation. Despite its scale the project began suddenly without the knowledge of either the residents or Government Agents of Vavuniya or Mullaitivu including AGAs Land Officers. Following the eviction of Indian Tamil farmers by the police and violence against neighboring Tamil villagers by the Sinhalese settlers, the LTTE attacked the Kent and Dollar Farm settlement at Weli Oya, killing 62 in November 1984. The next day, the LTTE massacred 11 Sinhalese at Kokkilai. A consequent report to the government recommended the militarization of settlements in the area, and the government complied.

The UTHR reported that the Weli Oya colonization scheme was only a ploy by the military to use civilians as "both bait and human shields against the LTTE." Two Sinhalese clergymen characterized it as an "unwanted provocation" by the state and as a legitimate military target.

Tamil families who were living in 42 villages for generations were asked to vacate their homes and farmlands within 48 hours or face eviction by force in case of default. The military went around these villages in armored trucked and made loud announcement over public address systems mounted on the trucks. The military also announced the government has cancelled the 99 years lease in respect of the lands given to 14 Tamil entrepreneurs. There were also a series of massacres and enforced disappearances of hundreds of Tamil civilians by the security forces around this area during this time.

=== Manal Aru becomes Weli Oya in 1988 - Extra ordinary Gazette notification ===
The traditional Tamil region known as Manal Aru named as Weli Oya (Manal in Tamil translated into Sinhalese becomes Weli; Aru in Tamil translated into Sinhalese Oya) in Sinhala by an extra ordinary gazette notification dated 16 April 1988. Weli Oya was proclaimed the 26th District of Sri Lanka. Manal Aru was lies north of the Sinhala colonization scheme of Padavia and from 1987, this administrative division was part of Pathaviya and was brought under the Anuradhapura administrative district.

Settlements in the Manal Aru began in 1984 as a dry zone farmer colony under the land Commission, but it was later acquired by the Sri Lanka Mahaweli Economic Agency in 1988 and declared as the Mahaweli ‘L’ zone. The land was officially renamed Weli Oya on April 16, 1988.

=== Colonisation after 2009 ===
After the defeat of Liberation Tigers of Tamil Eelam, Sri Lanka Mahaweli Authority recommenced Sinhala colonisation in the Manal Aru area, as part of the Weli Oya project of the Mahaweli L-zone, which covered the districts of Mullaitivu, Trincomalee, Vavuniya and Anuradhapura. Sinhalese were settled in traditionally Tamil land, given land, money to build homes and security provided by the Special Task Force. Although the scheme covered four districts, administration was handled from the Sinhalese dominated Anuradhapura district. The scheme aroused much anger amongst the Tamils. Today the area is almost exclusively Sinhalese.

== See also ==
- List of Sri Lankan Civil War battles
- List of attacks attributed to the LTTE
- List of attacks attributed to the Sri Lankan military
- Notable assassinations of the Sri Lankan Civil War
- List of civil wars
- Tamil Eelam
- Self-determination
