= List of attacks attributed to the LTTE, 1980s =

The following is a list of chronological attacks attributed to the LTTE in 1980s during the Sri Lankan Civil War. The deadliest single attack for the decade was the Anuradhapura massacre in 1985.

== Attacks in chronological order ==
=== 1983 ===
Date	Attack	Location	Sinhalese	Tamils	Muslims	Death toll	Sources
July 23	Four Four Bravo: 13 soldiers are killed in an LTTE ambush in Jaffna, sparking anti-Tamil riots that cause the death of approximately 4000 Tamils across Sri Lanka during four days, in what would be later labelled as Black July.	Jaffna, Jaffna District	13			13	

=== 1984 ===
1984 marked the intensification of the war between the Tamil separatists and the Sri Lankan government, as well as the first reports of civilian massacres by the LTTE.

Date	Attack	Location	Sinhalese	Tamils	Muslims	Death toll	Sources
November 11	Dollar Farm massacre: 33 civilians which included women and children were attacked in Dollar Farm village in the night by an armed group made up of LTTE cadres.	Mullaitivu District	33			33	
November 30	Kent Farm massacre: Following the attack on the Dollar Farm village, a second night raid was launched by the LTTE cadres which targeted the Kent Farm village, 29 civilians including women and children were massacred. They also looted and set fire on to victims houses.	Mullaitivu District	29			29	
December 1	Kokilai massacre: LTTE cadres kill eleven Sinhalese civilians in the fishing village of Kokilai.	Kokkilai, Mullaitivu District	11			11	
December 31	LTTE members kill 4 Tamil civilians and dump them outside of Batticaloa for refusing to fight for the group. Altogether 30 Tamil civilians were killed for similar reasons in 1984.	Batticaloa, Batticaloa District		30		30	

=== 1985 ===
1985 marked a major escalation of hostilities. For the first time the LTTE attacked a major Sinhalese majority town killing 146 unarmed civilians. The impact of this attack was felt across the island and received worldwide attention.

Date	Attack	Location	Sinhalese	Tamils	Muslims	Death toll	Sources
May 5	Wilpattu Village Massacre: Wilpattu, a Sinhalese village in Anuradhapura District, was the target of a raid of an armed group of LTTE cadres, who killed 18 villagers that included women and children.	Wilpattu, Anuradhapura District	18			18	
May 14	Anuradhapura massacre: LTTE gunmen shoot dead 146 Sinhalese civilians and injure 85 others as they were praying at Jaya Sri Maha Bodhi, a sacred Buddhist shrine in Anuradhapura.	Anuradhapura, Anuradhapura District	146			146	
May 14	LTTE cadres shoot dead 18 Sinhalese civilians in the Wilpattu National Park while they are fleeing from the massacre of 146 civilians earlier in the day (see Anuradhapura massacre).	Wilpattu National Park, Anuradhapura District	18			18	
May 30	LTTE cadres shoot and kill five Sinhalese civilians in the villages of Mahandapura and Dehiwatta. People of these villages had previously received numerous threats from the LTTE associates. This massacre was part of a series of massacres aimed at displacing Sinhalese from the North East of Sri Lanka.	Mahandapura and Dehiwatta, Polonnaruwa District	5			5	
June 4	Dehiwatta Village Massacre: Armed with sharp weapons over 100 LTTE cadres killed 15 villagers on their sleeping mats in the village of Dehiwatta. Victims included women and children, which were the majority killed.	Dehiwatta, Polonnaruwa District	15			15	
June 11	13 Sinhalese civilians are shot dead by LTTE gunmen in Dehiwatta.	Dehiwatta, Polonnaruwa District	13			13	
August 2	LTTE cadres shot dead three Sinhalese Buddhist monks and three civilians, while they were worshipping at the Ruhunu Somavathiya Temple.	Thrikonamadu, Polonnaruwa District	6			6	
August 14	Aranthalawa Village Massacre: Seven Sinhalese villagers were tortured and killed at Aranthalawa. They were targeted by an armed group of LTTE cadres.	Aranthalawa, Ampara District	7			7	
August 18	Namalwatta Village Massacre I: A group of LTTE cadres armed with sharp weapons hacked 7 villagers.	Namalwatta, Trincomalee District	7			7	
November 7	Namalwatta Village Massacre II: Ten villagers, including women and children were raided and executed at Namalwatta for the second time.	Namalwatta, Trincomalee District	10			10	
December 20	Six Madhu pilgrims, abducted by the LTTE on 12/12/85 were executed.	Mannar, Mannar District				6	

=== 1986 ===
Date	Attack	Location	Sinhalese	Tamils	Muslims	Death toll	Sources
February 2	Kantale Village massacre: Armed with small arms and swords LTTE cadres raided the village of Kantalai killing 19 civilians.	Kantalai, Trincomalee District				19	
February 19	When refugees from Serunuwara, Dehiwatta were being escorted by army personnel along Ella/Kantalai road, LTTE exploded a mine killing 35 civilians and four army personnel.	Sittaru Kantalai, Trincomalee District				39	
May 3	Air Lanka Flight 512: LTTE bomb explodes aboard Air Lanka flight carrying mainly French, British and Japanese tourists killing 21 (including 13 foreigners - of whom 3 British, 2 German, 3 French, 2 Japanese, 1 Maldivian and 1 Pakistani) and injuring 41 on Bandaranaike International Airport.	Katunayake, Western Province				21	
May 5	Kinniya Village massacre: Four Moor civilians were tortured and killed by a group of LTTE cadres.	Kinniya, Trincomalee District			4	4	
May 6	Central Telegraph Office Bombing: The Central Telegraph Office, Colombo was the target on a bomb detonated by the LTTE cadres which killed 14 civilians who were at the office.	Colombo				14	
May 25	Mahadivulwewa Village massacre: An armed group of LTTE cadres killed 20 Sinhalese by shooting them dead and set alight 20 houses.	Mahadivulwewa, Anuradhapura District	20			20	
June 2	Trincomalee 3rd Mile post massacre: Civilian homes at the 3rd mile post, Trincomalee were stormed by a group of armed LTTE cadres who killed 10 civilians, including women and children	Trincomalee				10	
June 4	Andankulam Village massacre: 17–20 civilians, including Ven. Bakamune Subaddalanakara Thero, were attacked, tortured and killed by LTTE cadres in the village of Andankulam.	Andankulam, Trincomalee District	17–20			17–20	
June 11	22 people were killed and another 75 others were injured when two bombs were detonated simultaneously by the LTTE on two buses heading to Kantalai and Colombo respectively. The first bus was front of the Bank of Ceylon Trincomalee branch and the other in close proximity to the SP office.	Trincomalee, Trincomalee District				22	
June 21	Wilgamwehera Village massacre: 9 civilians, including children, were murdered in the Wilgamwehera hamlet by LTTE cadres.	Wilgamwehera, Trincomalee District				9	
June 25	Bomb exploded in a vehicle by LTTE killed 16 Sinhalese.	Sittaru, Kantalai, Trincomalee District	16			16	
July 8	Monkey Bridge Village massacre: 15 Sinhalese villagers were shot to death by LTTE cadres.	Monkey Bridge, Trincomalee District	15			15	
July 9	Mollipothana Village massacre: Mullipothana village was stormed at night by a group of armed LTTE cadres who killed 16 civilians most of them being women and children.	Mullipothana, Trincomalee District				16	
July 13	Pavakkulam Village massacre: Nine Tamil and two Sinhalese villages were killed by four LTTE cadres who had arrived in a jeep to tract No. 16, Pavakkulam.	Pavakkulam, Trincomalee District	2	9		11	
July 19	Beruwil & Wadigawewa Village massacre: The villages of Beruwil and Waigawewa were stormed by large armed group of LTTE cadres numbering over 100, killing 17 villagers including women and children, as well as causing serious cut wounds to at least 5 others.	Beruwil & Wilgamwehera, Trincomalee District				17	
July 19	LTTE cadres shot dead twelve Sinhalese villagers.	Wadigawewa, North Central Province	12			12	
July 22	LTTE cadres exploded a land-mine on a civilian bus, killing 32 Sinhalese civilians and injuring 20 others.	Mammaduwa, Vavuniya District	32			32	
July 24	A bomb exploded inside a bus proceeding from Vavuniya to Anuradhapura; killing 13 passengers and injuring 40 others.					13	
July 24	About 50 LTTE cadres entered Damana, a Sinhalese village, and killed nine persons; another 13 were injured.	Damana, Central Province				9	
September 17	Kantalai massacre: LTTE cadres entered block No.4 of the Sugar Corporation, Kantalai and ten civilians were shot to death.	Kantalai, Trincomalee District	7	1	2	10	
September 17	Wadigawewa Village massacre: Following the Kantalai massacre, the village of Wadigawewa was attacked by the same group of LTTE cadres who killed 12 villagers including women and children.	Wadigawewa, Trincomalee District				12	

=== 1987 ===
Date	Attack	Location	Sinhalese	Tamils	Muslims	Death toll	Sources
4 February	Manthottam massacre: The village of Manthottam, which is mostly made up of Sinhalese, was attacked by a group of 50 armed LTTE cadres, who murdered eight villagers after brutally torturing them. The death toll was reduced since villagers had hid in the surrounding jungles anticipating such an attack.	Manthottam, Mannar District	8	-	-	8	
7 February	Arantalawa massacre: In a night house-to-house raid LTTE cadres armed with swords, machetes, clubs and small-arms killed 27 to 28 civilians including children and women. Pregnant mothers were found hacked to death and with their necks slashed.	Arantalawa, Ampara District	?	?	?	27-28	
7 March	Awarantalawa massacre: Six civilians were killed when the LTTE detonated a land-mine as troops were passing. Also killed were seven soldiers and four NAF soldiers.	Awarantalawa, Vavuniya District	?	?	?	17	
22 March	Serunuwara Horowpathana massacre: LTTE cadres shot dead 26 Sinhalese villagers.	Serunuwara Horowpathana	26	?	?	26	
25 March	Serunuwara massacre: Armed LTTE cadres stormed Serunuwara village, mostly inhabited by Sinhalese, and herded the farming families at gunpoint to a road. They were then shot there in execution style. In total 25 villagers were killed, most of whom were women and children.	Serunuwara, Trincomalee District	25	-	-	25	
17 April	Aluth Oya massacre: LTTE cadres shot dead 127 Sinhalese civilians, including 31 police and security force personnel who were travelling in 3 buses and 2 trucks to Trincomalee. The cadres clad in military uniforms stopped the vehicles and dragged out the passengers and shot them to death with automatic weapons after brutally assaulting them with clubs. Over 70 with injuries were air lifted. The dead included many children and 12 off duty security personnel. Most of the victims were families visiting their relatives for the new year.	Aluth oya, Habarana, Anuradhapura District	127	-	-	127	
20 April	Jayanthipura Massacre: The majority Sinhalese village of Jayanthipura was raided by a group of armed LTTE who murdered 15 civilians including women and children.	Jayanthipura, Polonnaruwa District	15	-	-	15	
21 April	Central Bus Station Bombing: A bomb detonated by militants at the central bus terminal of Colombo killed 113 civilians, two policemen and a soldier; 298 others were injured. Both the LTTE and EROS were blamed for the attack.	Pettah, Colombo District	?	?	?	116	
21 April	Jayanthipura massacre: 15 Sinhalese villagers were shot dead by LTTE cadres.	Jayanthipura, Trincomalee District	15	?	?	15	
29 May	Attack on Kadawathmadu: A group of armed LTTE cadres raided the majority Sinhalese village of Kadawathmadu killing seven civilians and leaving five others injured. Due to the LTTE threat, the villagers slept in jungle hideouts during the night, which reduced the casualties.	Kadawathmadu, Polonnaruwa District	7	-	-	7	
2 June	Aranthalawa Massacre: In the first massacre of Buddhist monks in modern Sri Lankan history, a bus carrying Buddhist monks was stopped by LTTE in Arantalawa. 32 Buddhist monks, including Chief Priest Ven. Hegoda Indrasara, were killed with only one monk surviving.	Arantalawa	32	-	-	32	
5 June	Nelliady attack: In the first suicide attack by the LTTE Black Tigers, a small truck laden with explosives was driven into a Sri Lanka Army base in Nelliady, Jaffna Peninsula by Vallipuram Vasanthan. Over 50 soldiers were killed along with Vasanthan.	Nelliady, Jaffna District	50	-	-	50	
11 June	Veppankulam attack: 13 civilians and a soldier were killed when a private van en route from Horowpathana to Trincomalee was blowup by a LTTE pressure mine.	Veppankulam, Trincomalee District	?	?	?	14	
12 June	Godapotta massacre: A meeting to discuss a new temple was attacked by the LTTE, who surrounded the temple and attacked the gathering of over 175 villagers, resulting in the deaths of eight villagers; a soldier and six people were injured.	Godapotta, Polonnaruwa District	?	?	?	9	
21 June	Godapotta massacre: The hamlet of Godapotha, a majority Sinhalese village in Polonnaruwa was raided by a group of armed LTTE cadres, killing eight villagers and injuring one. The death toll was reduced since villagers had hid in the surrounding jungles anticipating such an attack.	Godapotha, Polonnaruwa District	?	?	?	8	
29 July	Thoppur massacre: Nine villagers were killed after being tortured by LTTE cadres armed with swords, machetes and small arms.	Thoppur, Jaffna District	?	?	?	9	
6 October	Batticaloa: 18 Sinhalese civilians were shot dead by LTTE cadres.	Batticaloa, Batticaloa District	18	-	-	18	
6 October	Tharavi massacre: Tharavi, a majority Sinhalese village, was stormed by over 100 LTTE cadres armed with swords, machetes and small arms, who killed 25 civilians, mostly women and children including infants and pregnant mothers.	Tharavi, Batticaloa District	25	-	-	25	
6 October	Sagarapura massacre: A house-to-house massacre was carried out by LTTE cadres, clubbing children to death in front of their parents, and hacking the adults to death using sharp weapons. 27 Sinhalese villagers were shot dead. After looting their victims' homes, these were set alight, burning the wounded victims alive. Another six villagers survived the attack with serious cut wounds.	Sagarapura, Trincomalee District	27	-	-	27	
6 October	Valaichchenai massacre: 40 Sinhalese passengers in the night-mail train from Batticaloa were killed by LTTE cadres who stopped the train.	Valaichchenai, Batticaloa District	40	-	-	40	
7 October	Pottuvil Monargala Road massacre: 25 Sinhalese passengers travelling by bus were shot dead by LTTE cadres, who also killed five motorcyclists travelling along the same route.	Pottuvil, Ampara District	?	?	?	30	
10 October	Ganthalawa massacre: Gantalawa hamlet in Kantala was attacked and 9-10 civilians murdered with three wounded by LTTE cadres armed with swords, machetes and small arms.	Ganthalawa	9-10	-	-	9-10	
15 October	Ella Kantalai massacre: Ella Kantalai, a majority Sinhalese village, was attacked by LTTE cadres armed with swords, machetes and small arms, killing 14 civilians including women and children.	Ella Kantalai, Trincomalee District	14	-	-	14	
16 October	Pulimodai massacre: A private bus was stopped by LTTE cadres, who removed the Sinhalese people killing 11 including three policemen.	Pulimodai, Trincomalee District	11	-	-	11	
19 October	Kalkudah attack: A private bus transporting Tamil passengers was blown up by a LTTE land-mine, killing 40 persons and an IPKF soldier	Kalkudah, Batticaloa District	?	?	?	41	
9 November	Maradana bombing: 23 civilians were killed and 106 injured by LTTE cadres who exploded a bomb, another 15 were shot dead.	Maradana, Colombo District	?	?	?	38	
11 November	Kalkuda massacre: Seven Sinhalese people selling fish were shot dead by LTTE cadres.	Kalkudah, Batticaloa District	7	-	-	7	
12 November	Cheddikulam massacre: 12 Tamil persons and 13 PLOTE members were killed when their van was blown up by an LTTE land-mine.	Cheddikulam, Vavuniya District	-	24	-	24	
15 December	Devalagodella massacre: Devalagodella and Somavathiya villages were attacked by LTTE cadres armed with small arms and sharp weapons, killing 7-9 civilians.	Devalagodella, Polonnaruwa District	?	?	?	9	
22 December	Morawewa massacre: 5-6 Sinhalese and a Tamil were abducted and tortured to death by LTTE cadres.	Morawewa, Trincomalee District	5	1	-	6	
31 December	Mahadivulwewa massacre: 10 villagers were shot dead and 15 houses burnt by LTTE cadres.	Mahadivulwewa, Trincomalee District	?	?	?	10	
31 December	Kattankudy massacre: The Muslim majority village of Kattankudy is raided by LTTE cadres armed with sharp weapons and small arms, who carried out the killing of 30 civilians, including women and children with bodies severely mutilated.	Kattankudy, Batticaloa District	-	-	30	30	

=== 1988 ===
Date	Attack	Location	Sinhalese	Tamils	Muslims	Death toll	Sources
3 March	LTTE cadres shot dead 14 Sinhalese villagers.	Morawewa, Trincomalee	14	–	–	14	
11 March	A group of LTTE cadres attacked a private bus, 22 Sri 2218, with small arms and grenades, killing 19 passengers and injuring nine others.	Suhadagama, Horowpathana, Anuradhapura	19	–	–	19	
14 March	LTTE cadres shot dead 13 Sinhalese villagers.	Galmitiyawa, Kantalai	13	–	–	13	
15 March	Two groups of LTTE operatives entered the village and killed seven Sinhalese villagers.	Kivulkade, Morawewa, Trincomalee	7	–	–	7	
17 March	LTTE cadres hacked to death 13 Sinhalese villagers.	Deegavapiya, Damana, Ampara	13	–	–	13	
22 March	Between ten and 15 LTTE cadres attacked the Sinhalese village and killed six villagers; three were injured.	Pudukulam, Vavuniya	6	–	–	6	
22 March	LTTE cadres shot dead nine Sinhalese villagers.	Medavachchi-kulam, Vavuniya	9	–	–	9	
29 March	A LTTE bomb exploded inside CTB bus 29 Sri 9037 Anuradhapura which was proceeding from Horowpathana to Medavachchiya, killing nine passengers and injuring 14 others.	Wewalketiya	9	–	–	9	
31 March	LTTE cadres attacked the village, killing ten Muslims and seven Tamils.	Saindamaradu, Kalmunai	–	7	10	17	
8 April	LTTE gunmen killed 14 Sinhalese.	Horowpathana, Meegaswewa, Anuradhapura	14	–	–	14	
1 May	LTTE cadres exploded a land-mine on a CTB bus killing twelve Sinhalese, nine Muslims and five others unidentified.	Sittaru, Kantalai, Trincomalee	12	–	9	26	
28 July	LTTE operatives hacked to death 16 Sinhalese villagers.	Ethawetunawewa, Weli Oya	16	–	–	16	
16 August	LTTE cadres exploded a bomb, killing six Sinhalese, two Muslims, one Tamil, and a soldier; 19 persons sustained injuries.	Trincomalee (opposite Clock Tower)	6	1	2	9	
25 August	LTTE cadres killed eleven civilians by cutting their necks.	Marawila, Polonnaruwa	11	–	–	11	
10 September	LTTE cadres shot dead seven Sinhalese and four Tamils.	16th Colony, Central Camp, Ampara	7	4	–	11	
9 October	LTTE attack, details unclear (possibly including two security force personnel).	Mahakongaskada, Medavachchiya	–	–	–	–	

=== 1989 ===
Date	Attack	Location	Sinhalese	Tamils	Muslims	Death toll	Sources
January 17	Maharambekulam Village massacre		9			9	
February 2	Bogamuyaya Village massacre		11			11	
February 11	Dutuwewa Village massacre	Dutuwewa, Polonnaruwa District	37			37	
February 11	Singhapura Village massacre	Singhapura	6			6	
February 27	Borawewa Village bloodbath	Borawewa, Polonnaruwa District	38			38	
August 17	Nochchikulam Village massacre: An IDE explosion, killing eight civilians and injuring four others.	Nochchikulam, Vavuniya District				8	

== See also ==
- List of (non-state) terrorist incidents
