= 2006 anti-Tamil riots in Trincomalee =

Attacks on Tamils by Sinhalese mobs and Navy

- Location of the Trincomalee District in Sri Lanka
- Location: Trincomalee District, Eastern Province, Sri Lanka
- Date: 12–21 April 2006
- Target: Tamil civilians
- Attack type: Riots, arson, looting, assault, rape
- Weapons: Knives, swords, clubs, fire, guns, grenades
- Deaths: 20+
- Injuries: 75
- Perpetrators: Sri Lankan Navy, Sri Lankan Army, Sinhalese Home Guards, Sinhalese mobs
- Motive: Ethnic cleansing

The 2006 anti-Tamil riots in Trincomalee were a series of organized violence against the Tamil population of the Trincomalee District in eastern Sri Lanka, following a bomb blast on 12 April 2006. The violence was mainly carried out by Sinhalese mobs, Navy personnel and home guards with the overall complicity of the Sri Lankan security forces and police. By 20 April, the violence had left over 20 civilians dead, 75 injured, over 30 shops and 100 houses burned, and over 3,000 people displaced.

== Background ==
The Trincomalee District had long been a flashpoint of the country's ethnic conflict, with the district's population comprising nearly equal proportions of the country's three major ethnic groups (Sinhalese, Tamils, and Muslims). The state's policy of settling Sinhalese farmers in predominantly Tamil areas had reduced the Tamil population of the district from 64.8% in 1881 to 33.7% by 1981. This issue was a major bone of contention between the two communities, with Tamil leaders resisting what they saw as attempts by successive Sinhalese-led governments to alter the demography of the traditional homeland of the Tamil-speaking people, thus marginalizing them politically and culturally. With the beginning of the Sri Lankan civil war, the Sri Lankan armed forces had launched a policy of forcibly displacing the Tamil population of the district in the mid-1980s, depopulating entire villages, to break the territorial contiguity of the traditional Tamil homeland claimed by Tamil nationalists.

The progressive Sinhalisation of Trincomalee town and the resultant decline of Tamil influence also extended to its trading sector, with decade-long efforts to drive the Tamils out of it. It was in this context of insecurity felt by the local Tamils that the latest spate of communal unrest was sparked by the illegal erection of a Buddha statue behind the town's main market on 15 May 2005 by Sinhalese nationalist groups with the support of the Navy's Eastern Commander, Rear Admiral Sarath Weerasekera. This was opposed by the local Tamils as an act of provocation by Sinhalese Buddhists and the ensuing protests and violent incidents led to the security forces being reinforced in the area to protect the statue. The issue politically galvanized the Tamil voters and contributed to the victory of the Tamil National Alliance (TNA) in local elections.

Another notable incident contributing the volatile atmosphere was the massacre of five Tamil students in the town on 2 January 2006 by the Special Task Force, with a warning that Tamils will be evicted from the eastern province. According to the UTHR, this was intended as the prelude to the revival of "Sinhalisation of the East" ideological project that was being pursued by the extremist elements increasingly dominating the Defence Ministry.

On 7 April 2006, Vanniyasingham Vigneswaran, a prominent Tamil political activist and a supporter of the LTTE, was assassinated by state-affiliated paramilitary forces. He had led the protests against the Buddha statue and spearheaded the TNA victory after campaigning on the issues of the statue and the massacre of students. Following Vigneswaran's funeral on the morning of 11 April, the LTTE was suspected to have carried out the claymore mine attacks on the security forces and police in the district on that evening and the following morning, killing and injuring dozens.

== Anti-Tamil riots ==
=== 12 April ===
As the Trincomalee town was buzzing with commercial activity in preparation for the upcoming Tamil and Sinhala New Year celebrations, a parcel bomb exploded at the vegetable market on Central Road around 3:50 pm. Six Sinhalese civilians and a soldier were killed. Although the bomb was widely suspected to have been planted by the LTTE targeting security personnel, local Tamils felt that it was a setup by the security forces to attack Tamils and this was reportedly confirmed to a Tamil official by a Navy man.

Soon after the explosion, some naval personnel stationed nearby came running to the blast site shooting at random, reportedly hitting some people. A small crowd was also seen throwing stones and breaking vehicles on the premises of a large Tamil business establishment near the blast site.

Later on, within 15 minutes of the blast, gangs of young Sinhalese men armed with knives, swords, clubs and guns arrived in trucks and auto-rickshaws. The gangs consisted of security personnel in civilian clothing, auxiliary home guards and thugs from an illegal settlement under Army patronage. What started out as a relatively minor mob violence now became an organized one on a large scale, with the mob joining the organized gangs. Numbering between 100 and 150, the gangs went on a rampage through the town's business area along the Central Road and North Coast Road, with Tamil businesses being the primary targets. Tamil shops were singled out and systematically looted and burned, reminiscent of the anti-Tamil pogrom of 1983. The large Tamil business establishment, RR Marketing, was set on fire by the gangs; the owner and his employees were able to flee, and he had to start over for the fifth time since 1983. Overall, about 30 Tamil shops and 2 Muslim shops were burned.

Tamil civilians were also attacked, hacked to death and burned with gasoline. Several Tamil women were slashed with knives and swords, including a mother and her two-year-old child, with their faces, hands and breasts being mutilated. Reportedly six Tamil women were killed. Some Tamils were thrown into their burning shops. The Navy was at the centre of the violence, actively participating, with a senior naval officer later admitting to the Navy's involvement in organizing the violence. Most witnesses claimed that the Navy was specially brutal toward civilians. A Tamil youth who was shot at by a sailor but was missed as he was trying to get to his father's shop on Central Road witnessed the brutality of the naval personnel. The youth saw a sailor handing a man over to a sword-wielding thug telling him, "This is a Tamil, chop him". He also saw another sailor striking the head of a Tamil woman lying on the road injured from the market blast with the butt of his gun.

The violence later spread to the outskirts of the town. In Anpuvalipuram, a grenade was thrown at a Tamil shop and two Tamil shops were burned down, reported pro-rebel TamilNet citing civil sources. In Linganagar, a petrol station was burned and a Tamil man standing in front of it was hacked to death; two Tamils travelling on a motorcycle were slashed and burned alive; three burned bodies of Tamils were found inside a three-wheeler the next day, reported pro-rebel TamilNet citing medical sources. Tamil youths were slashed in areas in Keniyadi and near Madathady junction.

There was also a surge in sexual violence against Tamil women by the security forces. Four women who went to a shop that came under attack were abducted in a van and subsequently raped and robbed. A medical practitioner reported that Anpuvalipuram had a high prevalence of rape by the Navy and home guards, and mentioned an 18-year-old girl and two older women as among those who had come to consult him from there.

While the violence raged for two hours, the security forces and the police stationed in the area remained spectators without intervening. The policemen were ordered by their Headquarters Inspector not to take action against the Sinhalese gangs. Further evidence of state complicity was reinforced by the fact that all attempts by the businesses to contact the top security officials by telephone went unanswered despite the assurance given to them earlier that year that they could be called in case of an emergency.

A rumour was now floating around about an ethnic cleansing campaign at night. The plan was to drive the Tamils out of Trincomalee permanently and displace them in refugee camps. Fearing further violence, many Tamils fled their homes, seeking refuge in public buildings and places of worship. The violence was stopped only after Indian Prime Minister Manmohan Singh telephoned Sri Lankan President Mahinda Rajapaksa and urged him to protect Tamil civilians, thus averting a bigger disaster. A curfew was finally imposed and the security forces dispersed the gangs but no arrests were made.

Although the government and some media reports suggested that the violence was a spontaneous reaction to the bomb blast, a team of Colombo-based civil society groups after undertaking a fact-finding mission reported that there had been "an element of pre-planning". Accordingly, journalist D.B.S. Jeyaraj stated:

"this was no instance of angry mobs going berserk, but a case of cold-blooded calculation. It appears that a plan had been formulated to attack Tamils beforehand, and that the explosion was like a green-light signal."

Seven Tamil victims of the riots were identified; however, several charred bodies presumed to be Tamils went unidentified, some Tamil residents reported missing were feared dead and locals suspected that many Tamil corpses were disposed of by their killers. One estimate suggested over 20 Tamil and Muslim civilians were killed and another 19 people. About 70 people, mostly Tamils, were injured and 50 needed hospital treatment.

=== 14 April ===
On 14 April, following the discovery of the dead body of a Sinhalese youth in Mihindapura who had gone missing the previous day, another bout of anti-Tamil riots erupted on the outskirts of the Trincomalee town. Sinhalese mobs in Mihindapura with the help of the Army went on a rampage, setting fire to about 15 Tamil houses in the village and then burned down over 40 houses in the neighbouring Tamil village of Nadesapuram, 50 Tamil houses in Kanniya and 4-5 houses in Andankulam. The office and other properties of the Trincomalee District Youth Development Aham, a humanitarian NGO, was burned down. Nadeswarar Hindu temple was also burned down and a 60-year-old Tamil woman Somasuntharam Maheswary was dragged out of the temple and hacked to death. Also among the killed were an Indian national and astrologer Venkadasamy Venkatraman (30); and an employee of the Trincomalee district secretariat Thannimalai Namasivayalingam (28). Tamil villagers in affected and surrounding areas fled their homes, seeking refuge in schools and places of worship. By 20 April, the violence had displaced 2673 persons (723 families) according to an official estimate. Other estimates put the figure at over 3000. Tamil Rehabilitation Organisation made an urgent appeal for aid for total of 3306 internally displaced persons.

Tamil families sheltered in the school Varothiayanagar Bharathi Vidiyalayam recounted their ordeal:

"Our houses were burnt, properties were destroyed and we were attacked by thugs with knives and clubs while the State armed forces and police looked on. No one came to our rescue. We fled from our houses and sought refuge elsewhere to save our lives."

=== 21 April ===
On 21 April, further anti-Tamil violence erupted in other areas of the district following a claymore mine explosion in Kiliveddy in which a Sinhalese home guard was killed. An armed Sinhalese mob went on a rampage, burning down 45 houses in the Tamil villages Menkamam and Bharathipuram. Several Tamil civilians were killed, including a 32-year-old labourer Jeyachandran and another youth who were shot and hacked to death. Several Tamil women were also raped. Hundreds of Tamil families fled their homes to seek shelter in temples and schools.

== Reactions ==
=== Tamil National Alliance ===
On 14 April 2006, the Tamil National Alliance issued a statement condemning violence, accusing the state of orchestrating the ethnic cleansing of the Tamil population of Trincomalee:

"Like the July 1983 genocidal pogrom against the Tamils, the current violence against the Tamil speaking people has been unleashed in Trincomalee with the connivance of the SL Navy...The TNA considers that these continuous acts of State Terror are being unleashed on the Tamil speaking people, with the specific objective of terrorizing the Tamil speaking people into fleeing the Trincomalee District with the intention of ethnically cleansing the District of Tamils."

=== LTTE ===
On 14 April 2006, the LTTE's district political head S. Elilan issued a warning of major escalation if the violence continued:

"If the genocide attacks by State armed forces with the connivance of Sinhalese hoodlums continue in the Trincomalee district we would be forced to take steps to safeguard the lives and properties of innocent Tamil people in the district and that would lead to undesirable serious consequence on the current peace process."

=== Chamber of Commerce ===
On 15 April 2006, members of the Chamber of Commerce and Industries of Trincomalee District (CCITD) representing local businesses issued a statement during a conference accusing the security forces and the police of inaction every time their businesses had been targeted in rioting since 1977. They demanded compensation for the losses suffered and an assurance that pre-planned attacks on their businesses will not occur.

== Aftermath ==
As the armed conflict between the Sri Lankan armed forces and the LTTE resumed, Trincomalee town alone had had the highest rate of killing of civilians by state-linked forces by the start of 2007 and majority of the civilians killed in the district as a whole during this period were Tamils with perpetrators being overwhelmingly linked to the state. Tamil business community in particular continued to be the targets of attacks in Trincomalee. A prominent Tamil businessman and philanthropist Thambirajah Mayuran was murdered in his premises on 5 August 2006 by naval personnel in a plot hatched by a local Sinhalese chauvinist group to eliminate leading members of the Tamil community with the intention to demoralize it.

== See also ==
- List of attacks on civilians attributed to Sri Lankan government forces
- Role of the Sri Lankan Home Guards in the Sri Lankan Civil War
- Black July
- 1983 anti-Tamil pogrom in Trincomalee
- 1985 Trincomalee massacres
