= 1984 Manal Aru massacres =

Massacre of Tamil civilians by Sri Lankan military

Manal Aru massacres
- Location of Northern Province & Eastern Province in Sri Lanka
- Location: Mullaitivu District, Northern Province & Trincomalee District, Eastern Province, Sri Lanka
- Date: November–December 1984 (+8 GMT)
- Target: Sri Lankan Tamil Civilians
- Deaths: Unconfirmed (Hundreds)
- Injuries: Unknown
- Perpetrator: Sri Lanka Army
- Motive: Ethnic cleansing

From 1 December 1984 to 15 December 1984, the Sri Lankan military executed a series of massacres of Sri Lankan Tamil civilians across numerous traditional Tamil villages in the Manal Aru region, which spans the Mullaitivu and Trincomalee districts. The motive behind the massacres was to drive out the local Tamil population from their villages, in order to replace them with thousands of Sinhala settlers The Tamil people whom the military expelled remain permanently uprooted from their land, and a Sinhala colony called Weli Oya was formed in their place.

== State aided Sinhala colonization of Tamil areas ==
The Mullaitivu and Trincomalee Districts were dotted with what have been traditional Tamil farming and fishing villages for generations. It was interspersed with small and large farms owned by Tamils or held on long lease by Tamil-owned business enterprises. Among the large farms were: Navalar farm, Ceylon Theatres farm, Kent farm, Railway Group Farm, Postmaster Group Farm and Dollar Farm. Kent and Dollar farms were later used to rehabilitate the hill country victims of the 1977 anti-Tamil pogrom.

Throughout the 1980s the Sri Lankan government conspired many schemes to grab the lands of Tamils, and settle them with Sinhalese people. The deliberate and coordinated attacks on Tamil villages, however began after the 1983 Anti-Tamil pogrom in which more than 3000 Tamils were murdered and hundreds of thousands were forced to flee the island.

The Yan Oya settlement was one such, aimed at breaking the territorial contiguity of Tamil Eelam, the traditional homeland of Sri Lankan Tamils, between Trincomalee and Mullaitivu. The Yan Oya settlement scheme was administered by the Sri Lankan minister of Sinhala ethnicity Lalith Athulathmudali backed by President J.R. Jayewardene.

In November 1984, alleging Tamils as terrorists, the Superintendent of Police in Vauvuniya Arthur Herath raided and drove away the residents of Kent and Dollar Farm. Subsequently, Sinhala ex-convicts and prisoners were settled there. The settlement of prisoners was used to further harass Tamils into leaving the area. The Sinhalese settlers admitted that young Tamil women were abducted, brought there and gang-raped, first by the security forces, next by prison guards and finally by prisoners. On November 30, the LTTE raided the Kent and Dollar farms and massacred the Sinhalese there. The day after, the LTTE killed Sinhalese fishermen at Kokkilai. In response to the massacres, S. L. Gunasekara and Davinda Senanayake issued a report that recommended the increased militarization of the colonies. The government implemented the recommendation by increasing army presence in Weli Oya, but the LTTE continued attacking the settlements.

== Massacres ==
=== Manal Aru ===
On 03.12.1984, Sri Lankan military rounded up Manal Aru area and fired randomly at the civilians. Civilians from Manal Aru were chased away by the Sri Lankan military and their houses were set on fire. People who have lived in the villages for generations were thus displaced. Many civilians were killed including women and children. Hundreds of families were displaced from these areas. Sinhalese were settled in these villages later.

Army officers either visited or sent messages to village elders informing them of an impending attack on their villages and advised them to leave. They also used harassment - theft, assault, kidnapping and rape. The harassment was followed by direct onslaught.

=== Othiyamalai ===
Another instance of the harassment of the Tamils was the massacre at Othiyamalai during the succeeding months where more than 25 Tamils were killed by the army. TULF representatives who took part in the Indian brokered APC talks raised the events in Manal Aru with the government. They were told that the Sinhalese were being settled as part of a security cordon.

=== Amaravayal ===
Amarivayal is an ancient Tamil village in the north of Trincomalee district. It lies close to Padaviya. The village was neglected by the state and its inhabitants were harassed by Sinhala colonists who wanted to grab their farmland. People of the village received a message that, unless they left the village immediately, they would be attacked by the Sinhalese. N.Vijayaratnam in his book 'Manal Aru' describes the events:

The next moment the people gathered the few movables they possessed in cloth bundles and ran into the surrounding jungle. They waited there the whole of the night. They first heard gunshots from the direction of the village. Then they saw flames jump up. With burning hearts, they walked towards Mullaitivu and joined refugee camps. The young, boys and girls joined the LTTE and fought along with them to liberate their villages. They are yet to succeed. But they are determined to succeed.

=== Thennamarawadi ===
In retaliation for the Kokkilai massacre of Sinhalese, Sinhalese mobs led by soldiers invaded the village of Thennamarawadi variety of weapons, knives, axes, crowbars, clubs and guns. About 200 families lived in Thenaimarawadi at that time. They fled into the forest. The mob set fire to their huts and destroyed everything they could lay their hands on. The mob returned again the next day. They searched the forest for Tamils. They caught a few Tamils and soldiers shot them dead. Youths were lined up and shot. Women were also raped.

On the third day, 4 December, residents of Thenaimarawadi began their journey to safety; they walked through the forest for four days and reached Mulliyavalai in the Mullaitivu district. They built temporary sheds and stayed there. They named their new settlement Ponnagar meaning Golden Town. They have lived there for the past 20 years.

=== Kokkilai and other coastal villages ===
On 15 December 1984, a large number of Sri Lankan military troops entered the coastal villages of Kokkilai, Kokkuthoduvai, Alampil, Nayaru and Kumulamunai in Mullaitivu District. The Sri Lankan Army arrived and announced that several villages were to vacate within 24 hours. Entire villages in the region such as Kokkilai, Kokkuthuduvai, Karnaddu kerni and Koddai Keri amongst others were ordered to vacate within a day’s time. The military then began killing people and destroying property. 131 civilians were killed including 31 women and 21 children. More than 2,000 families were forced to relocate following the attacks and subsequent colonisation attempts of their lands by the Sinhala population. They remain displaced to this date.

== Aftermath ==
The Tamil community from this region never returned to its original prosperity. Similar treatment was meted out to numerous traditional villages in the Batticaloa, Ampara, Vavunia and Mannar districts.

In December 1984, the Liberation Tigers of Tamil Eelam reprised these colonization attempts by attacking these newly established colonies in North-East which were heavily protected by Sri Lankan military and Sri Lankan Home Guards who had earlier ethnically cleansed the native Tamil population from these villages.

Following the recapture of the North and East by Government forces, the land border between Mullaitivu District and Trincomalee District were once again colonized with Sinhalese settlers in what were traditionally Tamil lands. Sinhalese were settled in traditionally Tamil land, given land, money to build homes and security provided by the Special Task Force. As a result, the demographics of the region had been significantly altered and a new division called the Weli Oya Divisional Secretariat (the Sinhalese equivalent of the Tamil term "Manal Aru") was carved in the southern parts of the Mullaitivu district. Today the majority of the population in the area is Sinhalese while Tamils have been systematically denied any claim to their lands.

== See also ==
- Sri Lankan state sponsored colonisation schemes
- List of attacks on civilians attributed to Sri Lankan government forces
