= 1983 anti-Tamil pogrom in Trincomalee =

Attacks on Tamil civilians by Sinhalese mobs and security forces

- Location of the Trincomalee District in Sri Lanka
- Location: Trincomalee District, Eastern Province, Sri Lanka
- Date: June–July 1983
- Target: Sri Lankan Tamils
- Deaths: 30+
- Injuries: 100+ in June
- Perpetrators: Sri Lankan military, Sri Lankan Home Guards, Sri Lanka Police, Sinhalese mobs
- Motive: Ethnic cleansing

The 1983 anti-Tamil pogrom in Trincomalee consisted of organised violence by Sinhalese mobs and security forces against the Tamil population of Trincomalee between June and July 1983.

At least 27 Tamils (including women and children) were killed in the ensuing violence, with hundreds of Tamil homes, shops, hotels, boats and temples being destroyed. These events served as a prelude to the subsequent Black July pogrom that followed the killing of 13 Sri Lankan Army soldiers in 23 July, and subsequently the Sri Lankan civil war.

Nancy Murray, a member of the council of the Institute of Race Relations, summarised the violence as follows:

"The two-months pogrom at Trincomalee left the town in ruins, thousands homeless and over 30 dead by the end of July. There was a certain method in all this destruction. For years, the government had been sponsoring Sinhalese settlement of Eastern Districts. These settlers were too willing to take part in acts of aggression against their Tamil neighbors, as part of their expansionist drive."

== Background ==
Since the 1930s, the Sinhalese-dominated government moved Sinhalese settlers to the predominantly Tamil-speaking Eastern Province, claiming to restore what they saw as lost ancient Sinhala settlements, as well as to reduce the Tamils' claim to local autonomy. The Sinhalisation of Trincomalee was seen as the key to sundering the contiguity of Tamil habitations in the North and East. Tamil nationalists viewed this as an attempt to alter the demographics of their 'traditional Tamil homeland', thus weakening the Tamils' stake in it.

== Pogrom ==
The violence began in the first week of June and often occurred during curfew hours, where the security forces would provide 'security' to attacking Sinhalese mobs, whilst also shooting Tamil victims who fled the scene of attacks for breaking the curfew.

The typical pattern of violence involved security forces conducting 'search' operations in a particular Tamil area and apprehending a few young men under 'suspicion' in order to ensure that the area was left defenceless. Subsequently, organized Sinhalese mobs would seize the opportunity to move in and set properties on fire. They would also attack Tamil villages at night, where they would burn, rape and pillage.

In light of the worsening situation, A. Amirthalingam visited Trincomalee on 1 July to investigate. He returned to Colombo the following day and sent president J. R. Jayewardene the following telegram:

"Just returned after personally studying situation in Trincomalee. Reports of violence by both sides absolutely incorrect. Over sixteen people killed – all Tamils. About forty people in hospital seriously injured by cutting and shooting – over thirty-five Tamils. One hundred and fifty houses burnt – over ninety five percent Tamil houses. Nearly a thousand people dehoused and in refugee camps – not one Sinhalese. Services conduct search in Tamil areas terrorizing people and this followed immediately by thugs attacking the Tamil people and setting fire to the houses."

Before the Black July riots, government ministers complained about the settlements of Up-Country Tamil refugees in Trincomalee District by Gandhiyam, a Tamil humanitarian organization. Gamini Dissanayake suggested that both legal and extra-legal measures would be taken to deal with them.

The violence further escalated during Black July, when naval personnel were observed carrying cotton swabs and cans of oil, which they openly employed to commit arson in premises owned by Tamils. Tamil civilians, including children between the ages of 1–4, were also shot and hacked to death.

By the close of the violence on August 10, Amirthalingam recounted the events of the last 2 months in a further letter addressed to president Jayewardene. He stated that the Black July pogrom against Tamils "did not break out suddenly" as a result of the killing of 13 soldiers in Jaffna on July 23, but was "actually started on a planned basis" which began with the attacks on Tamils in Trincomalee on June 3. He further stated that this violence in Trincomalee went on with "ebb and flow for over two months" and that "27 Tamils have been killed during this period as against one Sinhalese".

He further detailed the role of the security forces in the violence:

"About 150 Navy personnel went on a rampage and destroyed about 200 Tamil business places and houses in Trincomalee town in six hours on the night of the 26th July. With the assistance of the police and army about 200 houses of Tamils were burnt in the Trincomalee District and 1,500 persons who were rendered homeless had to seek shelter as refugees in school buildings. There seems to be a calculated move to drive the Tamils out of Trincomalee by terrorising them."

=== Timeline of events in June ===
- 2 June – Organised Sinhalese fishermen attack Tamil fisherman and burn their boats. Tamils blame the armed forces for instigating the violence. The following day, Sinhalese fishermen at Samudrapura are overheard talking about “breaking of heads” and “teaching Tamils a lesson”.
- 3 June – In Trincomalee town, an attempt is made to petrol bomb Yal Cafe.
- 4 June – In Trincomalee town, a mansion hotel owned by MP B. Neminathan is attacked and set ablaze by a mob after the hotel's guards were removed by the army. A van and all the furniture in the hotel are destroyed. None of the perpetrators are apprehended by the police. At China bay, a Hindu temple is attacked and damaged.
- 5 June – In Villangkulam, 8 Tamil houses are set ablaze. In Pankulam, N.Sriskandarasa is murdered and the Ganesha Temple is set ablaze.
- 7 June – In Mullippaththanai, S. Rajathurai is murdered.
- 8 June – In Trincomalee town, a chariot belonging to a Siva temple is burnt and a sub-postmaster Mr. S.Sivanandam is shot at and his house set ablaze. Several Tamil houses are also bombed.
- 9 June – At Huskisson Road in Trincomalee town, Samson's house is bombed.
- 11th June – In Trincomalee town, two bombs are thrown at MP R. Sampanthan's house at 3:30 AM, despite a dusk to dawn curfew being imposed. At Ehambaram road, a business centre is also bombed. A Tamil youth called Rasathurai is also murdered and a Tamil fishing hut is set ablaze. At the dockyard, a bomb is thrown at the Gandhi hotel.
- 13th June – At central road, bombs are thrown at 4 Tamil shops, leaving the shops damaged and 4 people injured. At main street, a furniture shop is bombed. At China bay, employees at the Prima Factory are attacked, leaving 5 injured. In Pankulam, the house of one Gunapala is set ablaze.
- 14 June – In Panmathavachchi, 4 Hindu shrines are damaged.
- 15 June – Opposite of the Trincomalee Railway station, a Tamil clerk's house is burnt. A Tamil CTB employee's house is burnt in front of the Uppuveli police quarters.
- 17 June – In Kinniya, two people are murdered.
- 18 June – In Anpuvalipuram, 3 Tamil houses are burnt. The charred bodies of two murdered brothers, Sandanam Sunderarajah (32) and Sandanam Krishnamoorthy (29), are discovered in the jungle around the Uppuveli police area.
- 21st June – In Thoduvapillaiyar, 6 Tamil houses are burnt. In Koviladdy, another 6 Tamil houses are burnt.
- 22 June – In Singanagar, 3 Tamil houses are burnt.
- 24 June – In Trincomalee town, the houses of Mendis and Wilson are bombed. At Sivayogapuram, two Tamil house are burnt.
- 25 June – In Sivayogapuram, 30 Tamil houses are burnt.
- 26 June – In Trincomalee town, the Nescafe Hotel is bombed.
- 27 June – At Kithul Ootrue, a Tamil minibus is burnt and the 17 Tamil passengers attacked. Several sustained gun shot injuries and are admitted to hospital. 2 Hindu temples are also set ablaze in the area, and Thirunavukarasu, Seetha and Usha are hacked and burnt to death. At Uppuveli, Alvarpillai and Ramanan are hacked to death. Alvarpillai's wife and 3 other children also suffer from cut injuries and are hospitalised. At Anuradhapura Junction, 10 Tamil shops and 2 Sinhalese shops are burnt. At central road, Rajamani stores is bombed.
- 28 June – At a Thirukkadaloor temple, the Navy apprehend three Indian tourists, Sabaratnam, Kahrass and Amirthalingam. They are then handed over to an armed mob who brutally hacked them, leaving them bleeding on the road. Sabaratnam dies at the scene while the other two are eventually hospitalised. At Uppuveli, the Golden Sands Beach Hotel and Restaurant is set ablaze. At Panmathavachchi, a Hindu temple is burnt.
- 29 June – In Pankulam, 9 Tamil houses are burnt and Rajagopal, Thavamani and another person are murdered. At Palaioottru, 30 Tamil houses are burnt.
- 30 June – In Nachchikulam, 30 Tamil houses are burnt. At China bay, close to the Air Force quarters, 32 Tamil houses and a Catholic ashram are burnt. Two Tamils, Santhirarasa and Selvarasa, are hacked to death. At Vilveri, 30 Tamil houses are burnt. At Paraiyankulam, Vadivel, Chinniah, Poopayee and Valliammah are murdered, while 4 others between the ages of 7-80 sustain injuries and are hospitalised. 27 houses are also destroyed. At central road, the Kalai Magal shop is set ablaze.

== See also ==
- List of attacks on civilians attributed to Sri Lankan government forces
- Black July
- 1985 Trincomalee massacres
- Role of the Sri Lankan Home Guards in the Sri Lankan Civil War
