= Maladera nilaveliensis =

Scientific classification
- Kingdom: Animalia
- Phylum: Arthropoda
- Class: Insecta
- Order: Coleoptera
- Suborder: Polyphaga
- Infraorder: Scarabaeiformia
- Family: Scarabaeidae
- Genus: Maladera
- Species: M. nilaveliensis

Binomial name
- Maladera nilaveliensis Fabrizi & Ahrens, 2014

Species of beetle

Maladera nilaveliensis is a species of beetle of the family Scarabaeidae. It is found in Sri Lanka.

== Description ==
Adults reach a length of about 8.2–8.3 mm. They have a dark reddish brown, short oval body, with yellow antennae. The dorsal surface is shiny and densely and finely setose.

== Etymology ==
The species is named after its type locality, Nilaveli.
