= Kokkuthodavai mass grave =

Kokkuthodavai mass grave is the mass burial of Tamil people suspected to have been killed extrajudicially during the Final stages of the Sri Lankan Civil War . It was discovered in Kokkuthodavai, Mullaitivu District while National Water Supply and Drainage Board dug for laying water pipes. Tamil groups have demanded an International investigation and staged a shutdown in North East Sri Lanka.
