= Kent and Dollar Farm massacres =

Killing of Sinhalese civilians in Sri Lanka

- Location: Kent and Dollar Farms, Vavuniya, Sri Lanka
- Date: 30 November 1984
- Attack type: Massacre
- Weapons: Submachine guns, automatic rifles, hand grenades
- Deaths: 82 killed (including civilians, home guards, military personnel)
- Perpetrator: Liberation Tigers of Tamil Eelam (LTTE)

The Kent and Dollar Farm massacres were the first massacres of Sinhalese civilians (who were settlers belonging to a colony of 400 Sinhalese prisoners and their families) carried out by the LTTE during the Sri Lankan Civil War. The massacres took place on 30 November 1984, in two tiny farming villages in the Mullaitivu district in north-eastern Sri Lanka. The Sri Lankan government labeled this as an attack on civilians by the LTTE.

== Backdrop to the events ==
The Kent and Dollar farms were bought on a 99-year lease from the state in 1965. They were located near Manal Aru, a divisional Secretariat in the district of Mullaitivu. Manal Aru was of immense importance due to its central location in the Tamil-majority north and east of Sri Lanka.

The farms were donated by a wealthy Tamil landowner in 1978 for the resettlement of Indian Tamil refugees displaced by the 1977 anti-Tamil pogrom. The farms were prosperous and the Indian Tamil farmers were cultivating minor crops. However, realising its strategic importance and in a bid to quell the rising threat of Tamil separatism, an attempt was made by the state to colonize the area with Sinhalese people. By October 1983 the Superintendent of Police Arthur Herath saw the farms as being obstacles to the northward expansion of Sinhalese colonization in Padaviya and accused the farmers of being "terrorists" or of "harbouring terrorists". Journalist T. Sabaratnam claimed that Herath tried to convince local Jaffna and Vavuniya Tamils that the Indian Tamils were their economic competition.

In June 1984, the Vavuniya police led by Herath raided the farms and the Indian Tamil families were assaulted and taken to the hill country. In meetings following the evictions, National Security Minister Lalith Athulathmudali claimed that the forced relocation was for their own protection, to prevent them from being forcibly recruited by the "terrorists", although the families were content there and did not want to leave.

The government subsequently took over the farms, converted them into open prisons and settled 450 Sinhalese prisoners and their families as part of a program sponsored by Athulathmudali to solve the "Tamil problem". The settlement of prisoners was used to further harass Tamils into leaving the area. The Sinhalese settlers admitted that young Tamil women were abducted, brought there and gang-raped, first by the security forces, next by prison guards and finally by prisoners.

== Massacre ==
About 50 LTTE cadres travelled in the night in two buses armed with rifles, machine guns and grenades. One of the buses went to Dollar Farm and the other to Kent Farm. The attacks was timed to start at about the same time in the early hours of the morning. The LTTE fighters shot and killed the guards, the women and children and most of the male members of the families. Some of the prisoners were thrust into a room in a building and blasted with explosives.

62 Sinhalese; including 3 jail-guards, 31 women and 21 children were killed. The second bus proceeded to the Kent Farm 8 kilometres away and killed 20 more home guards. The death toll of Sinhalese civilians killed by the LTTE attack numbered 65 Sinhalese villagers; including 3 jail-guards, 31 women and 21 children were killed. The second bus that proceeded to Kent Farm killed 20 more home guards. The LTTE had claimed that the victims were armed; however, Human Rights Watch reported that the violence was one-sided against the victims.

== Aftermath ==
The next morning, the police and the troops conducted a cordon and search operation and the government claimed that the troops had killed 30 "terrorists", but Tamil sources stated that the victims were all civilians from the neighboring Tamil villages. The LTTE also stated their cadres had returned without suffering any loss. The same day, the LTTE massacred 11 Sinhalese at Kokkilai.

In the two days immediately after the massacre, Tamil civilians in the surrounding areas were subjected to killings, arrests and disappearances by the Sri Lankan security forces. According to an affidavit of a former detainee provided to the Amnesty International, over 100 Tamil men detained from these areas were brought to the Iratperiyakulam army camp in the northern Vavuniya District, shot dead and their bodies were burned by the Sri Lankan Army.

In response to the massacres of Sinhalese, S. L. Gunasekara and Davinda Senanayake issued a report that recommended the increased militarization of the colonies. The government implemented the recommendation by increasing army presence in Weli Oya, but the LTTE continued attacking the settlements. From 1988 to 1989 Sinhalese villages in Weli Oya was put on a war-footing. A total of 3,364 families, most of them landless peasants, were settled in Weli Oya. A further 35,000 persons comprising 5,925 families were also settled under the same scheme.
