= Roshan Biyanwila =

Air officer of the Sri Lanka Air Force

Air Vice-Marshal Roshan Biyanwila VSV, USP, ndc, psc (also known as RS Biyanwila) is a senior Air officer of the Sri Lanka Air Force who is serving as Director General of the Sri Lanka Civil Security Force. Earlier, he was deputy Chief of Staff of the Sri Lanka Air Force. Before that, he was Director Administration at Air Force Headquarters from 2020 to 2022.

== Early life and education ==
Biyanwila was educated at St. Peter's College Colombo. Thereafter he joined the Sri Lanka Air Force as an Officer Cadet in the Administration Branch as an Officer Cadet in 19th inake course. He holds a Master of Business Administration from the University of Bedfordshire, United Kingdom.

== Air Force career ==
Roshan Biyanwila served as Secretary of Sri Lanka Cricket Board while he was Air Commodore. He took over the responsibility of Secretary, Sri Lanka Cricket board in January 2018. He was Media Spokesperson representing Air force at Media Centre for National Security (MCNS) while he was Group Captain. After promoted to Air Vice Marshal he became Director of Admin. He officially took over the deputy chief of staff, SLAF appointment on 1 January 2023.

== Personal life ==
Biyanwila is married to mrs.Dilini and together they have a daughter and son.
