= Kokkilai massacre =

Massacre of Sinhalese at Kokkilai in 1984 by the LTTE

- Location of Northern Province, Sri Lanka
- Location: Mullaitivu District, Northern Province, Sri Lanka
- Date: 1 December 1984 (+8 GMT)
- Target: Sinhalese civilians
- Deaths: 11-13
- Injuries: Unknown
- Perpetrator: Liberation Tigers of Tamil Eelam

The Kokkilai massacre was a massacre of Sinhalese civilians carried out by the Liberation Tigers of Tamil Eelam in the coastal village of Kokkilai. It was the group's second massacre of Sinhalese civilians.

== Background ==
In the early 1900's, Sinhalese Catholic fishing families from Negombo settled in Kokkilai. Throughout the following decades, Kokkilai was a popular fishing spot for migrant Sinhalese fishermen from Negombo. During the 1958 riots and 1977 riots, Sinhalese property had been burned, but Sinhalese and Tamils generally maintained good relations in the area.

During the civil war, the Mullaitivu District was hotly contested between the Sri Lankan government and Tamils. The army had evicted Indian Tamil residents of the Kent and Dollar farms and settled Sinhalese there. A day before the Kokkilai massacre, the LTTE massacred the Sinhalese on the farms. However, unlike the farms, Sinhalese residents of Kokkilai maintained that the government had not settled any Sinhalese in the village.

== Incident ==
The LTTE ordered a Tamil van driver to take them to Kokkilai. The van driver had flashed the lights as he approached the Sinhalese, allegedly to warn them of the impending massacre. When the van was near them, the militants jumped out and began throwing explosives and opening fire. Those not immediately killed ran to their boats to flee into the ocean. A child, injured in the gunfire, died in the boat. Two women were bound by their hair and shot dead at point-blank range. In total, around a dozen Sinhalese were killed. The LTTE later boasted about having killed "Sinhalese ruffians."

== Aftermath ==
The survivors of the massacre became refugees and relocated to Negombo, where they found it difficult to adjust to the new fishing conditions, and many stopped fishing outright. In response to the massacres of Sinhalese at Kent and Dollar farm and Kokkilai, S. L. Gunasekara and Davinda Senanayake issued a report that recommended the increased militarization of the colonies in Weli Oya. The government implemented the recommendation by increasing army presence. A more general exodus of Sinhalese from Weli Oya occurred. The Kokkilai massacre had also led to a Sinhalese mob attack on Tamils at Thennamarawadi. The army increased measures to drive local Tamils away.
