= Sri Lanka Civil Security Force =

National Home Guard Service of Sri Lanka

Civil Security Department
- සිවිල් ආරක්ෂක දෙපාර්තමේන්තුව சிவில் பாதுகாப்பு துறை
- Active: 1 January 1986 – present
- Country: Sri Lanka
- Type: Auxiliaries
- Role: Civil Defence
- Size: 33,687
- Part of: Ministry of Defence
- Garrison/HQ: Colombo
- Motto: Protect the Country with Self-Sacrifice
- Engagements: Sri Lankan Civil War
- Website: csd.lk

Commanders
- Director General: Air Vice Marshal Roshan Biyanwila
- Notable commanders: Rear Admiral Sarath Weerasekara

Insignia
- Flag

The Civil Security Department (Sinhala: සිවිල් ආරක්ෂක දෙපාර්තමේන්තුව Sivil ārakshaka depathamentuwā; Tamil: சிவில் பாதுகாப்பு துறை) (also known as the CSD) is an auxiliary force administered by the Sri Lankan Ministry of Defence.

It traces its roots to the Home Guards which were lightly armed local volunteers organized to protect their villages from attacks by the LTTE. These units were formed into the National Home Guard Service in 1986 under the Mobilization of Supplementary Force Act No. 40 of 1985. These home-guardsmen came under the command of the local police becoming one of two paramilitary units under the Sri Lanka Police. The Home Guard Service was re-structured on under the Gazette notification No. 1462/20 of 13 September 2006 which established the Civil Security Department (CSD). The CSD is headed by a Director General, currently held by Air Vice Marshal Roshan Biyanwila.

The CSD is not to be confused with the Sri Lanka National Guard, which is a volunteer reserve regiment of the Sri Lanka Army.

== Functions ==
Sri Lankan Distinct Islamic Fractions of CSD hand over their Weapons

The original role of the CDS was the protection of "threatened villages" also known as "border villages" that were adjacent to LTTE held areas most of which are in Puttalam, Anuradhapura, Vavuniya, Trincomalee, Polonnaruwa, Ampara and Monaragala Districts. However the role later expanded to protecting important sites and supply routes.

The main roles of the CDS are,

- To serve as auxiliary to the police and the military to aid in the maintenance of internal security,
- To serve in static defensive duties such as manning checkpoints, guarding low priority buildings or installations, guarding villages, etc. during time of war,
- To proved security for government buildings and institutions,
- To function as an emergency force intended for special tasks directly or indirectly connected with the defense of the country, and
- To help the community in any kind of emergency, such as a natural disaster.

Other, more special duties include:

- Providing security to centers of economic importance during time of war,
- Protecting supply routes during time of war.

== History and establishment ==
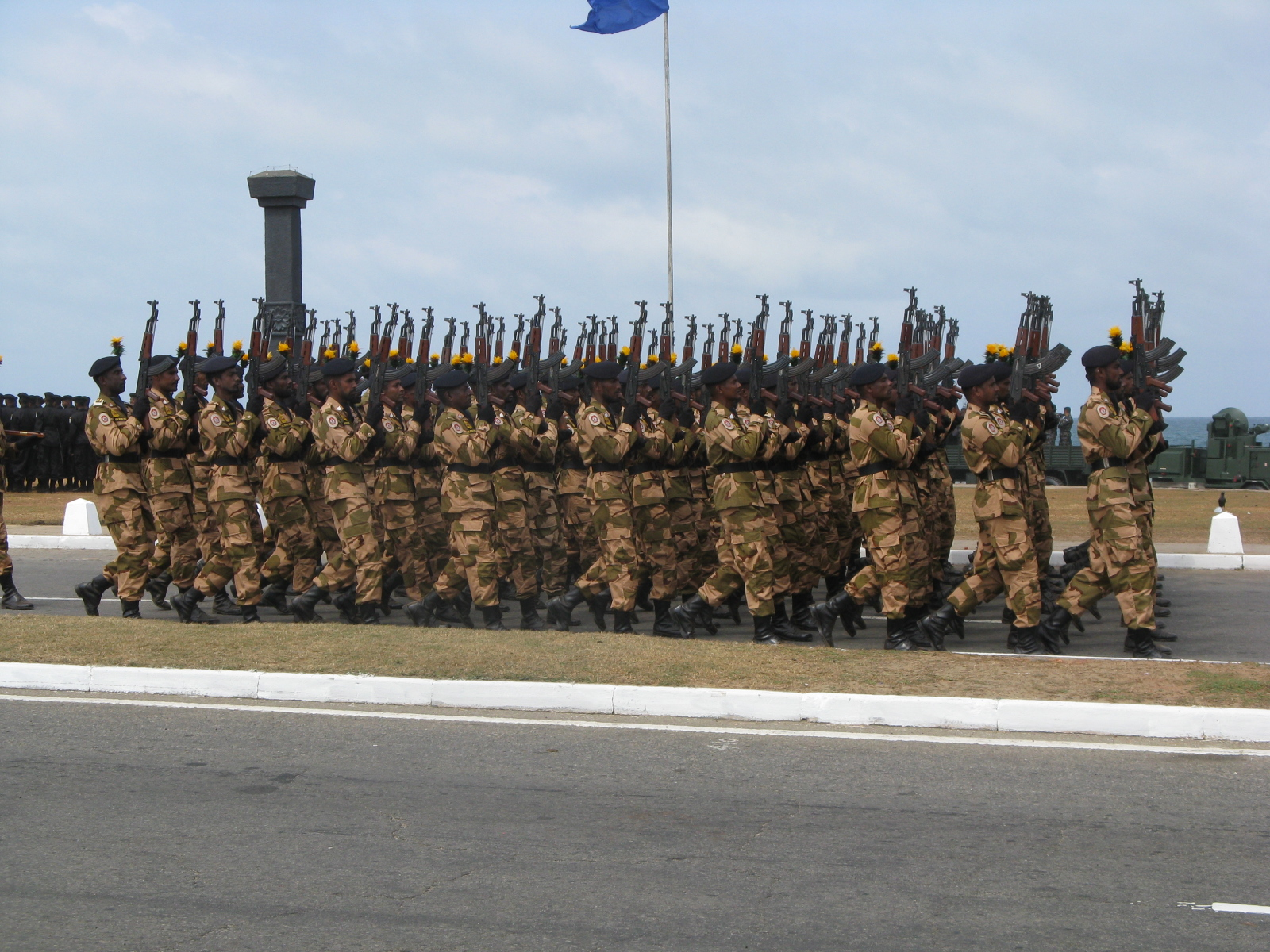
The male CSF members at an independence day parade

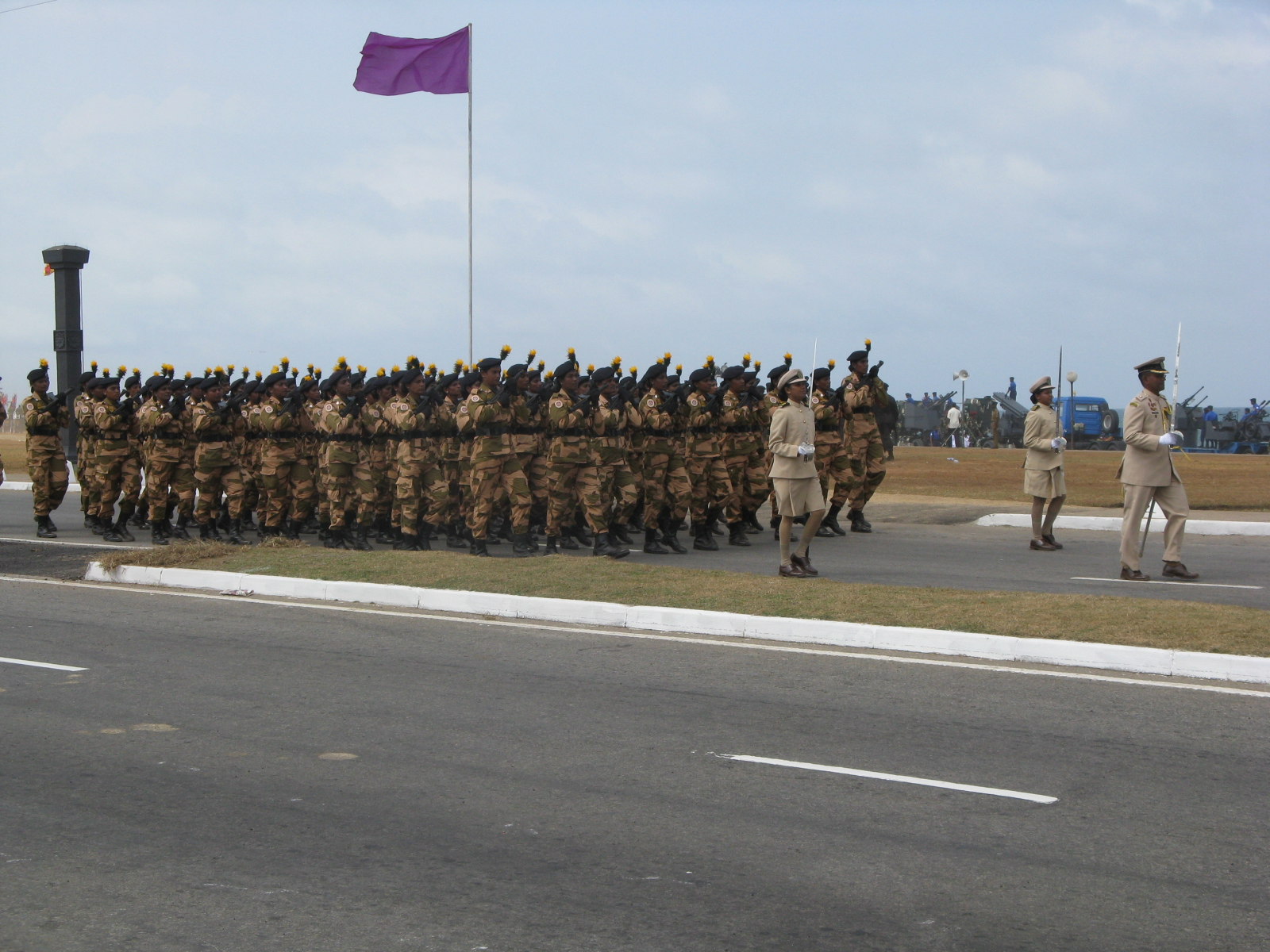
The female CSF members at an independence day parade

Starting from the early 1980s, civilians were recruited and armed as territorial defence units. Following the 1982 elections, the state through the Mahaweli Authority pursued a policy of forcibly evicting Tamil villagers in Weli Oya and Maduru Oya areas and establishing Sinhalese settlements there in order to counter Tamil separatism. A 30-member security unit consisting of Sinhalese settlers in Maduru Oya was formed in 1983 with the support of the Mahaweli Authority and the Sri Lankan armed forces. The Sinhalese settlers were trained in firearm use and strategic defence. Many of these settlers were later recruited as home guards in the border villages between Sinhalese and Tamil areas. The introduction of the home guards in May 1984 contributed to the escalation of the ethnic conflict, with Tamil civilians being attacked by them and the LTTE launching attacks against Sinhalese settlers in November.

The National Home Guard Service was thus established in 1986 by then Minister of National Security Lalith Athulathmudali with a strength of about 5000 personnel, armed with 12 gauge shotguns and brown uniforms. No allowances were paid initially, but some rations were issued through co-operative outlets. Subsequent to the takeover by the Police, the volunteers were paid a daily allowance and provided training at Kumbuka camp, Horana.

In 1988 guardswomen were allowed to volunteer, and 1993 saw the first issue of automatic rifles to the Home Guard. However they were not very well organised, trained, or motivated resulting in many villages being massacred by LTTE raids. Further during the 2002 ‘'Ceasefire Agreement" their importance was reduced and were given non-security duties.

In April 2006 due the resumption of the conflict and LTTE raids the then Secretary of Defence, Gotabaya Rajapaksa reformed the organisation renaming it into the Civil Defence Force, followed by the establishment of the Department of Civil Security on 1 January 2007 (through gazette notification No. 1462/20 of 13 September 2006) to oversee it. The first Director General of the Civil Defence Force was Rear Admiral Sarath Weerasekara.

Functions of the Department of Civil Security were established to be:

- Taking actions as a supplementary force for aiding and assisting the armed forces and police service, depending on the prevailing security status in the country,
- Taking action to safeguard villages, properties, and cities where terrorist threats are present,
- Assisting the police and armed forces to maintain law and order,
- Engaging in security duties on instances of national events and any other important occasions,
- Assisting with disaster mitigation and relief efforts,
- Assisting with social welfare activities,
- Carrying out any special duties specified by the President, line ministries or the government, and
- Operation of a Civil Security Department Headquarters.

The numbers employed increased to 41,500 from just 19,200 and a month-long military training regime under Army and Navy Instructors was introduced. Further, two types of uniforms (similar to military uniforms) were issued to guardsmen. Those in the most vulnerable places were even equipped with night vision equipment. Since then, members of the force have been deployed outside their home villages to maintain public security, including within the capital Colombo. By May 2009 near the end of the war 80% of the Main Supply Routes and 75% of the Forward Defence Lines were guarded by the CDF as well as major religious places such as Sri Maha Bodhiya and Dalada Maligawa as well as crucial economic targets.

Rear Admiral Sarath Weerasekara with the approval of the Defence Secretary formed a special elite unit called ‘Nandimithra' named after one of the Ten Giant Warriors. The elite unit consisted of four-man groups from almost all vulnerable villages that were special commando training for ten weeks including ambushes, night fighting, un-armed combat including Angampora. They waited in pathways leading to villages and ambushed LTTE forces that attempted to target villagers and their success deterred terrorist attacks. Unlike the rest of CDF whose duty was to hold off the enemy protecting civilians until reinforcement arrive Nandimithra units launched limited offensives just outside the threatened villages.

In the post-war period, CSD personnel are involved in community service projects, including agriculture, social welfare development, animal husbandry, and construction projects. After 2019 further recruitment was halted to reduce the force in size. As of 2023 the numbers had been reduced to 33,687. It has been proposed to early retire the entire force due to the 20 Billion LKR yearly cost of maintaining it and the lack of duties with many staying home earning salaries.

== Ranks ==
Current ranks

- District Officer
- Leader
- Sub Leader
- Civil Guard

Former ranks

- District Officer
- Warden
- Sub Warden
- Home Guard

== Training ==
Training is provided in two stages: basic training is provided by the Sri Lankan Army at various army training centres, usually for 2–4 weeks, while periodical training is carried out by mobile training units in the areas where units are deployed.

== Equipment ==
- Type 56-2 assault rifle
- FN FAL
- Heckler & Koch G3
- Glock 17

== Former Directors-General ==
- Rear Admiral Sarath Weerasekara
- Major General Nandana Senadeera
- Major General Ranjan Lamahewage
- Air Vice-Marshal Roshan Biyanwila
