= Manthai East Divisional Secretariat =

- Divisional Secretariat
- Country: Sri Lanka
- Province: Northern Province
- District: Mullaitivu District
- Time zone: UTC+5:30 (Sri Lanka Standard Time)

Manthai East Divisional Secretariat is a Divisional Secretariat of Mullaitivu District, of Northern Province, Sri Lanka.

== Demography-Religion ==
Religion in Manthai East DS Division (2012)
1. Buddhist (2.30%)
2. Hindu (89.2%)
3. Muslim (0.20%)
4. Roman Catholic (3.80%)
5. Other Christian (4.40%)
6. Other (0.00%)
