= Oddusuddan Divisional Secretariat =

- Divisional Secretariat
- Country: Sri Lanka
- Province: Northern Province
- District: Mullaitivu District
- Time zone: UTC+5:30 (Sri Lanka Standard Time)

Oddusuddan Divisional Secretariat is a Divisional Secretariat of Mullaitivu District, of Northern Province, Sri Lanka.

== Demography-Religion ==
Religion in Oddusuddan DS Division (2012)
1. Buddhist (4.00%)
2. Hindu (85.4%)
3. Muslim (0.40%)
4. Roman Catholic (4.40%)
5. Other Christian (5.60%)
6. Other (0.30%)
