= Maritimepattu Divisional Secretariat =

- Divisional Secretariat
- Country: Sri Lanka
- Province: Northern Province
- District: Mullaitivu District
- Time zone: UTC+5:30 (Sri Lanka Standard Time)

Maritimepattu Divisional Secretariat is a Divisional Secretariat of Mullaitivu District, of Northern Province, Sri Lanka.

== Demography-Religion ==
Religion in Maritimepattu DS Division (2012)
1. Buddhist (1.20%)
2. Hindu (71.5%)
3. Muslim (6.10%)
4. Roman Catholic (18.3%)
5. Other Christian (2.90%)
6. Other (0.10%)
