= Puthukudiyiruppu Divisional Secretariat =

Puthukkudiyiruppu Divisional Secretariat
- Divisional Secretariat
- Location within Sri Lanka
- Country: Sri Lanka
- Province: Northern Province
- District: Mullaitivu District
- Time zone: UTC+5:30 (Sri Lanka Standard Time)

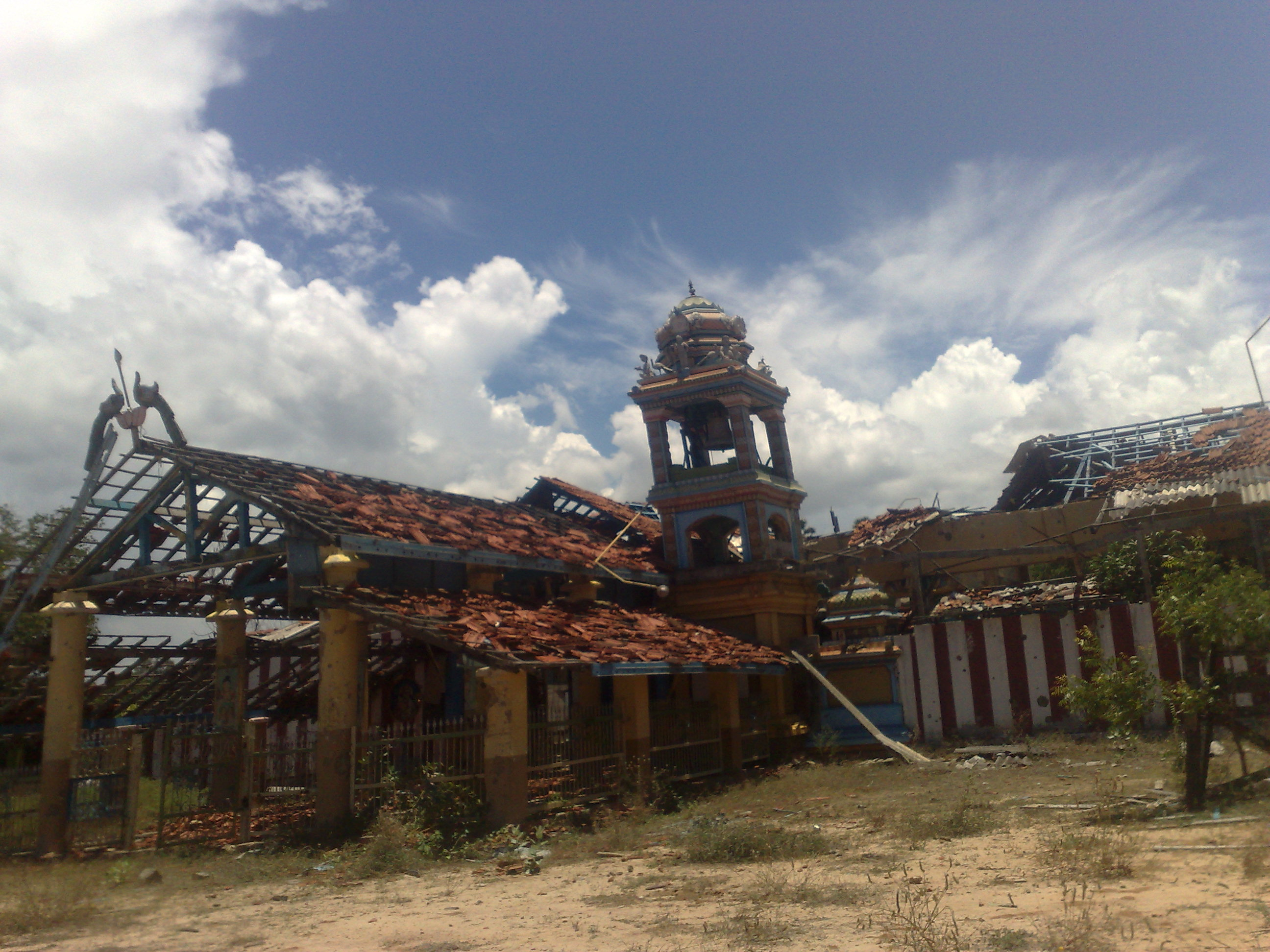
Puthukkudiyiruppu Sri Kandhaswamy temple, 2010

Puthukkudiyiruppu Divisional Secretariat is a Divisional Secretariat of Mullaitivu District, of Northern Province, Sri Lanka.

== Demography-Religion ==
Religion in Puthukkudiyiruppu DS Division (2012)
1. Buddhist (0.20%)
2. Hindu (84.8%)
3. Muslim (0.10%)
4. Roman Catholic (9.70%)
5. Other Christian (5.20%)
6. Other (0.00%)
