= Thunukkai Divisional Secretariat =

- Divisional Secretariat
- Interactive map of Thunukkai Divisional Secretariat
- Country: Sri Lanka
- Province: Northern Province
- District: Mullaitivu District
- Time zone: UTC+5:30 (Sri Lanka Standard Time)

Thunukkai Divisional Secretariat is a Divisional Secretariat of Mullaitivu District, of Northern Province, Sri Lanka.

== Demography-Religion ==
Religion in Thunukkai DS Division (2012)
1. Buddhist (1.70%)
2. Hindu (89.5%)
3. Muslim (0.10%)
4. Roman Catholic (4.70%)
5. Other Christian (3.90%)
6. Other (0.00%)
