= State-sponsored Sinhalese colonisation =

Sri Lankan government policy

Sri Lankan state-sponsored colonisation is the government programme of settling mostly Sinhalese farmers from the densely populated wet zone into the sparsely populated areas of the dry zone. This has taken place since the 1950s near tanks and reservoirs being built in major irrigation and hydro-power programmes such as the Mahaweli project.

Sinhala Buddhist nationalists within the Sri Lankan government, Buddhist clergy and Mahaweli department have deliberately targeted the Tamil majority northeast for state sponsored Sinhala colonisation, with the explicit intention to take the land into "Sinhala hands" away from the Tamils, and to disrupt the Tamil-speaking continuity between the north and east. This resulted in a significant demographic shift, with the resettled farmers contributing to an increase in the Sinhalese population in the northeast dry zone, thus promoting Sinhala-Buddhist hegemony in the area. Sinhalese settlers were provided with preferential access to land by the state in these regions, whilst the local Tamil speaking people were excluded from this privilege, making them minorities in their own lands.

Whilst empowering Sinhalese settlers, the scheme also served as a means to marginalize, exclude, and harm Tamil speaking minorities, treating them as the 'other'. It has been perhaps the most immediate cause of inter-communal violence, with violent displacement of Tamil civilians to make way for Sinhalese settlers occurring several times. The University Teachers for Human Rights has described this as ethnic cleansing of Tamils occurring with the support of the government since the 1956 Gal Oya riots. Following the end of war in 2009, Sinhalese officials and settlers in Weli Oya have expressed their desire to take more land further north in order to “make the Sinhala man the most present in all parts of the country”.

== Introduction ==
Shortly after independence, the government of Ceylon started a programme to settle farmers in the jungles of the Trincomalee District. The forests were cleared and water tanks restored. As a consequence of these schemes the Sinhalese population of the Trincomalee District rose from 15,706 (21%) in 1946 to 85,503 (33%) in 1981. In the 1980s the government extended the colonization schemes into the Dry Zone area of the Northern Province, drawing up plans to settle up to 30,000 Sinhalese in the area. Colonization schemes also took place in the areas of Ampara and Batticaloa districts. The Sinhalese population rose from 31,107 in 1953 in the combined Batticaloa and Amparai Districts to 157,017 in 1981, an increase far in excess of the natural projected growth.

The notion of the "traditional Tamil homeland" became a potent component of popular Tamil political imagination while the Sinhalese nationalist groups viewed the resettlement schemes in these areas as "reclamation and recreation in the present of the glorious Sinhalese Buddhist past".

== 1950s ==
The first colonisation scheme was in the Gal Oya Valley in the Batticaloa District in 1952. Tens of thousands of Sinhalese peasants from the Kegalle and Kandy districts who suffered from land hunger were given fertile land in the upstream end of Gal Oya. A minority of Tamils and Muslims were also given land in the region. Gal Oya would later be the site of the first major anti-Tamil riot in 1956. Gate Mudaliyar Mohammed Samsudeen Kariapper commented on the effects of this predominant Sinhala colony:

"In the past, for so many centuries, the community I come from has been the majority community in the Gal Oya Valley, but today by a process of operations carried on by the Gal Oya Development Board and the Provincial Administration, we the Muslims feel that we in our homeland are being reduced to a minority."

The next colonisation scheme was at Kantale (Kanthalai) tank where peasants from outside of the Trincomalee District were settled in the then Tamil dominant village of Kantale (Kanthalai), 39 km south-west of the Trincomalee town. 77% of settlers were Sinhalese and the rest were Tamils and Muslims.

A colonisation scheme was at the areas surrounding the Kantale Tank, 25 km south of Trincomalee town. 65% of settlers were Sinhalese and the rest were Muslims.

The colonisation scheme was extended to Tamil speaking areas of Anuradhapura District. A scheme was started at Padaviya Tank (Pathavik Kulam), 65 km north-east of Anuradhapura town. Parts of the scheme lay in Trincomalee District but were administered by the Sinhalese majority Anuradhapura District. Land Development Department employees from this scheme took part in the 1958 anti-Tamil riots.

Colonisation of Southern Dry Zone in the south of Ceylon was carried out mainly under the Walawe River Valley which was planned in 1959. The Uda Walawe Project started in 1969 which resulted in 30,000 net irrigable acres and settlement of around 3440 settlers in the southern dry zone. The development of settlements around Walawe, Chandrika and Kiri Ibban reservoirs saw population in the selected region growing from 2,000 in the 1950s to 200,000 by the 2000s.

== 1960s ==
In the 1961 a colonisation scheme was started at Morawewa tank (Muthali Kulam), 24 km west of the Trincomalee town.

== 1980s ==
In the 1980s, funded by aid received from the European Community, a colonisation scheme was started at Periya Vilankulam (Mahadiulwewa) tank, 30 km north-west of Trincomalee town.

The colonisation scheme was extended into the Northern province with the introduction of the Weli Oya (Manal Aru) scheme, which covered the districts of Mullaitivu, Trincomalee, Vavuniya and Anuradhapura. Sinhalese farmers were settled in lands that were formerly populated by ethnic Tamils, given land, money to build homes and security provided by the Special Task Force. Although the scheme covered four districts, administration was handled by the Anuradhapura district, which constituted a Sinhalese majority demographic. The scheme aroused much anger amongst the Tamils. This anger boiled over into violence when the Liberation Tigers of Tamil Eelam attacked the Kent and Dollar Farm settlement at Weli Oya, killing 62.

In 1985, a Sri Lankan government appointed study group recommended using Sinhala colonisation to break the link between the Tamil majority regions of the north and east. President J. R. Jayewardene publicly announced that his government planned to settle Sinhalese in the predominantly Tamil Northern Province over the next 2 years in order to create a 75% Sinhalese majority there (to reflect the overall nationwide proportion of Sinhalese to Tamils on the island).

From 1985, security forces and Sinhalese settlers massacred and displaced thousands of Tamils in the Trincomalee District. In 1987, Tamil leaders and militants claimed that after the Indo-Lanka Accord was signed, the government settled large numbers of Sinhalese in areas of Trincomalee that had been vacated by Tamils who were displaced in refugee camps since 1985.

== 1990s ==
Pro-rebel TamilNet reported that when the Indian Peace Keeping Forces were withdrawn in 1990, Tamils homes in the suburbs of Trincomalee were occupied by Sinhalese settlers. Tens of thousands of landless Sinhala peasants were reported to have been brought in by the advancing government forces and made to occupy local villages and lands, denying resettlement to its original inhabitants who had earlier fled to the jungles due to the "murder" of Tamil civilians at the hands of the Army.

== 2000s ==
An incident of state colonization before the final Eelam War was reported by Muslim residents of the Pulmoddai village in Trincomalee District who claimed that several acres of their traditional land had been annexed by the government for settlers from south on the pretext of industrial development.

== Post-2009 ==
Since the fall of the LTTE and the capture of de facto Tamil Eelam, several settlement programmes were initiated by the government that extends towards the Northern Province. In the Vavuniya district 3000 acres in Madukulam (Maduwewa) are being cleared for a village, while work of a settlement is underway in the former LTTE stronghold of Othiyamalai Kaadu. A settlement is being created in Rampaveddi bordering the minor tank area of Eropothana and new settlement of approximately 2500 ethnic Sinhala families (about 6000 people) from the South were settled in the village of Kokkachaankulam. Tamils in Barathypuram were evicted and a Muslim settlement is being created in the area due to the large economic opportunities provided by an apparels factory being built there.

Several new settlements are also being built in Mullaitivu District while the Weli Oya settlement is being expanded as well. Several fishing colonies are being built in the Mannar district and Muslim settlements have been built in lands previously owned by Tamils that fled to India during the war. "Navatkuli Housing Project" is being built in Navatkuli, Jaffna District to house 135 Sinhalese families, including 54 families who had, in 2010, attempted to set up temporary residences at the Jaffna Railway Station with funding from Buddhist Organizations and Political parties.

Following the defeat of the LTTE, the Mahaweli project, which had been temporarily halted, gained new momentum. The Mahaweli Authority and the military resumed activities to bring in landless Sinhalese settlers from the southern parts of the country to settle in and around Weli Oya. Despite ongoing displacement of thousands of Tamils from their land and homes, the Mahaweli Authority, under successive governments since the end of the war, continues to allocate land to Sinhalese settlers in the same areas.

Pro-rebel TamilNet reported that Tamils were being ethnically cleansed in the Jaffna peninsula and Mullativu districts, and that this was being supplemented with the construction of Buddhist stupas and Sinhalisation of names of streets and places. It further stated that the Tamil populace had been reduced to a fourth between 2007 and 2011 based on Government figures. Tamil locals also complained of the state waging an accelerated campaign of Sinhala Buddhist colonisation by destroying historic Hindu shrines in the East. Over 400 families were reported to have been settled in Nelukkulam in Mullativu district by the website.

== 2024 ==
In March 2024, Sri Lankan media reported that the Sri Lanka Army handed over 100 acres of occupied civilian land to their rightful owners in the 24th consecutive release since the end of the war. According to the army, the military occupied only 0.5% of land in the North on national security grounds.

== 2025 ==
In May 2025, Sri Lankan Prime Minister Harini Amarasuriya stated that the government had no intention to acquire lands owned by residents of the Northern and Eastern provinces and that it was committed to restoring ownership of lands to rightful owners. However, Tamil families, civic groups and leaders continue to protest against the army occupation of Tamil lands and appropriation of private Tamil lands by government departments and Buddhist clergy for the purpose of Buddhist archeology and constructing Buddhist viharas.

In 2025, the Sinhalese Buddhist monk Galgamuwa Ven. Santhabodhi obstructed Tamil farmers from cultivating their private lands near the foothills of Kurunthurmalai and claimed that it instead belonged to a Buddhist temple. Santhabodhi has publicly stated that he plans to "excavate and conserve" many Buddhist temples in the north in order to destroy the concept of a Tamil homeland:

"My plan is to excavate and conserve about 7 or 8 other temples in the north in the next five years...the north and east are not historically Tamil. They created a false history for the north saying it was their homeland. We must root this homeland concept out. When the Buddhist ruins in the north are conserved no one will be able to say that these provinces were not Buddhist. We can use this to squash the homeland concept."

On 21 July 2025, a Sinhala Buddhist monk, Walahahengunawewe Dhammaratana, filed a formal complaint with the Criminal Investigation Department (CID). He claimed that a senior official, Mr. Jayathilaka, had transported “artefacts” in bags and planted them around Kurunthurmalai in order to fabricate ancient Buddhist links. This deception was done to justify the seizure of 300 acres of adjoining farmland.

== See also ==
- Origins of the Sri Lankan civil war
- Sri Lankan Civil War
- Black July
