= Kokkilai =

Kokkilai கொக்குளாய்
- Town
- Location within Northern Province
- Coordinates: 9°00′0″N 80°57′0″E
- Country: Sri Lanka
- Province: Northern
- District: Mullaitivu
- DS Division: Maritimepattu

Kokkilai or Kokilai or Kokkulaay (Tamil: கொக்குளாய் Kokkuḷāy Sinhalese: කෝකිලායි) is a town in the Mullaitivu District, Sri Lanka. It is located about 40 km south-east of the District capital Mullaitivu. It is a coastal town, located next to Kokkilai lagoon, it is also close to Trincomalee District border.

== See also ==
- 1984 Kokkilai massacres (army)
- 1984 Kokkilai massacre (LTTE)
- 1985 Kokkilai Offensive
