= T. Sabaratnam =

Sri Lankan journalist

- Born: 1932; Ariyalai, Jaffna District, Ceylon
- Died: March 5, 2011, Age 79; Colombo, Sri Lanka
- Education: Madras Christian College
- Occupation: Journalist
- Writing career
- Notable awards: 1986 SLAAS Award for best science writing, 2007 Sri Lanka Press Institute (Editor's Guild)

T. Sabaratnam (1932–2011), was a Sri Lankan journalist. He began his career as a journalist with the Thinakaran newspaper in 1957, before switching to English media in the late 1970s. He spent a further 40 years at Lake House, Sri Lanka's largest publishing house. He was the Senior Deputy Editor of the Daily News before retiring in 1997. After retirement, he continued to contribute as a respected columnist, journalist trainer and author, and was respected for his independence.

He was also noted for being a remarkable translator, who trained young journalists in balanced and unbiased reporting. He wrote several article for The Nation (Sri Lanka) and other English and Tamil newspapers.

He was also a renowned science journalist for over a generation, being awarded by the 'Sri Lanka Association for the Advancement of Science' (SLAAS) in 1986 as the first winner for best science writing. In 2007, he was also felicitated by the Sri Lanka Press Institute (Editor's Guild) for his tremendous contribution to journalism.

He was also a lecturer in journalism at the Colombo University, Open University and Sri Lanka College of Journalism.

== Books ==
- Out of Bondage: The Thondaman Story, Sri Lanka Indian Community Council (Colombo), 1990.
- Murder of a Moderate: Political Biography of A. Amirthalingam, Dehiwela : Nivetha Publishers, 1996.
- Pirapaharan, Ilankai Tamil Sangam, 2003–2005.
