= S. L. Gunasekara =

Sri Lankan politician, author and lawyer (1943–2015)

Attorney-At-Law S. L. Gunasekara MP

Member of Parliament for National List
- In office 1989–1994
- President: Ranasinghe Premadasa; Dingiri Banda Wijetunga
- Prime Minister: Dingiri Banda Wijetunga; Ranil Wickremesinghe

Personal details
- Born: Suneetha Lakshman Gunasekara; 22 July 1943 Ceylon
- Died: 8 January 2015 (aged 71) Colombo, Sri Lanka
- Party: Sri Lanka Freedom Party
- Other political affiliations: Jathika Hela Urumaya
- Spouse: Nimal Gunasekara
- Children: Theodore, Sudath, Sunethra
- Parent: Edwin Herbert Theodore Gunasekara
- Education: Sri Lanka Law College; S. Thomas' College, Mount Lavinia
- Occupation: Attorney at law
- Known for: Senior Lawyer; Author; Member of Parliament (1989-1994)

Suneetha Lakshman Gunasekara, MP (22 July 1943 - 8 January 2015) was a Sri Lankan lawyer and Member of Parliament from 1989 to 1994. Between 1985 and 1987, he acted as an honorary advisor to President J.R. Jayewardene's administration on terrorist affairs.

He also played a significant role in representing the Sri Lankan government during the first round of peace talks with the Liberation Tigers of Tamil Eelam (LTTE) in Thimpu.

== Early life and education ==
Born in Colombo to Edwin Herbert Theodore Gunasekara, a Supreme Court judge and Olive Eleanor Gunasekara. S.L. Gunasekara attended S. Thomas’ College in Mount Lavinia, for his Primary & Secondary Education. Where he excelled, becoming leader of the school's debating team and winning several awards, including the Ilangakoon Memorial Prize, and the prize for the best debater of STC in 1961. He also served as the president of the literary union and co-editor of the school magazine.

In 1962, he entered Aquinas University College, becoming the president of the students’ union, and was awarded the Sir Vaithyalingam Duraiswamy challenge cup in 1963 for his oratory skills. In 1966 he obtained his LL.B from the University of Ceylon and subsequently entered the Ceylon Law College in 1967. During his time at Law College, Gunasekara won the Sir Ponnambalam Ramanathan Gold Medal for the best impromptu speech and the Hector Jayawardene Gold Medal (for the address to the jury). Gunasekara became an advocate in that same year.

== Career ==
Gunasekara joined the Attorney General's Department as a Crown Counsel, and worked there for 4 years. He resigned in 1972 and joined the Unofficial Bar.

From 1985 to 1987, he served as an honorary advisor to the government of President J.R. Jayewardene on terrorist affairs. During this time, he represented the Sri Lankan government at the first round of peace talks between the government and the Liberation Tigers of Tamil Eelam (LTTE) in Thimpu.

== Political career ==
Gunasekara entered the Sri Lanka Parliament in 1989 as a nominated Member on the National List joining Sirimavo Bandaranaika, until 1994.

== Bibliography ==
- Indo-Sri Lanka Accord – An analysis
- Pandora's Package
- A tragedy of errors, Abomination
- The report of the Eleven Pundits
- Where angels fear to tread
- Rajapaksa versus Fonseka
- The Lore of the Law
- Wages of sin
