= Welioya Divisional Secretariat =

- Divisional Secretariat
- Country: Sri Lanka
- Province: North Central Province
- District: Anuradhapura District
- Time zone: UTC+5:30 (Sri Lanka Standard Time)

Welioya Divisional Secretariat is a Divisional Secretariat of Anuradhapura District, of North Central Province, Sri Lanka.

Welioya Divisional Secretariat was a planned Sinhalese Only Colonization settlement funded by Asian Development Bank and Government of Japan on the lands of Ethnic Tamil Farmers, used to be part of Northern Province for administrative purpose brought under the jurisdiction of the Government Agent, Anuradhapura District.

== Demography-Religion ==
Religion in Welioya DS Division (2012)
1. Buddhist (99.1%)
2. Hindu (0.10%)
3. Muslim (0.00%)
4. Roman Catholic (0.60%)
5. Other Christian (0.20%)
6. Other (0.00%)
