= Mullaitivu District =

Mullaitivu District: முல்லைத்தீவு மாவட்டம்; මුලතිවු දිස්ත්‍රික්කය
- Administrative District
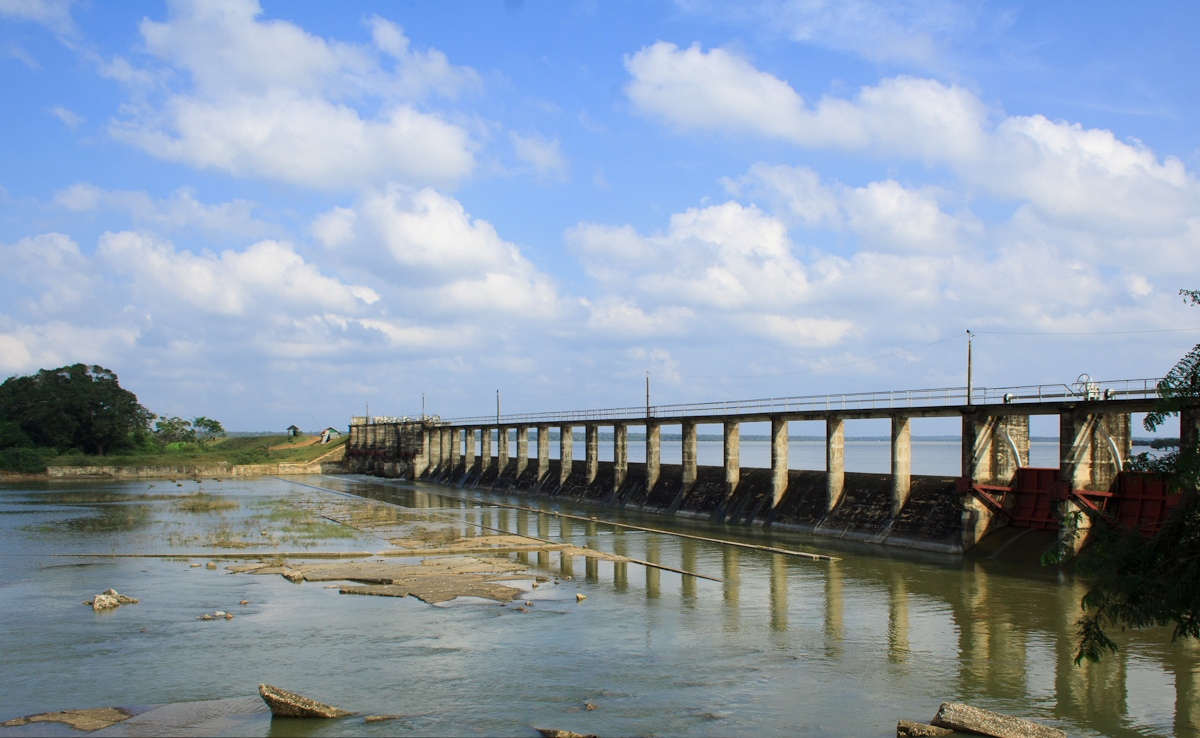
- Iranamadu Tank

- Location within Sri Lanka

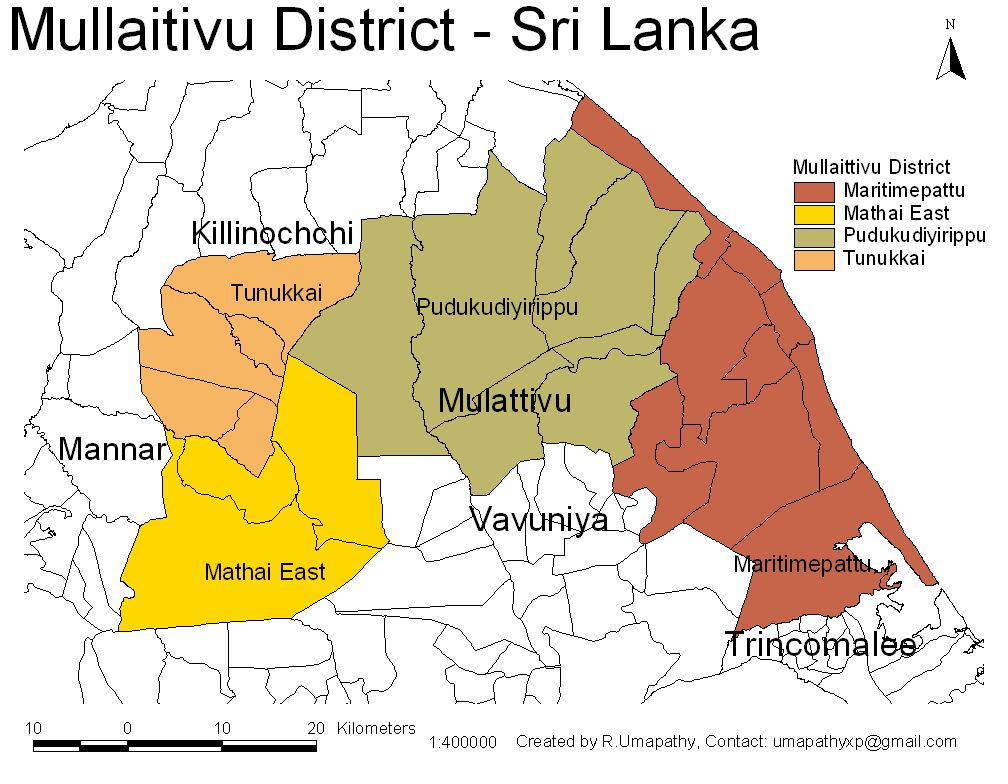
- DS and GN Divisions of Mullaitivu District, 2006
- Coordinates: 09°14′N 80°32′E
- Country: Sri Lanka
- Province: Northern
- Created: September 1978
- Capital: Mullaitivu
- DS Division: List: Manthai East; Maritimepattu; Oddusuddan; Puthukudiyiruppu; Thunukkai

Government
  - District Secretary: N. Vethanayagam
  - MPs: List: Selvam Adaikalanathan; Sivasakthy Ananthan; Rishad Bathiudeen; Hunais Farook; Muthali Bawa Farook; Vino Noharathalingam
  - MPCs: List: A. L. Y. J. Cassim; Anton Jeyanathan; T. Raviharan; S. Sivamohan; K. Swami Veerabahu

Area
  - Total: 2,617 km^{2} (1,010 sq mi)
  - Land: 2,415 km^{2} (932 sq mi)
  - Water: 202 km^{2} (78 sq mi) 7.72%
  - Rank: 11th (3.99% of total area)

Population (2012 census)
  - Total: 91,947
  - Rank: 25th (0.45% of total pop.)
  - Density: 38.07/km^{2} (98.61/sq mi)

Ethnicity (2012 census)
  - Sri Lankan Tamil: 79,081 (86.01%)
  - Sinhalese: 8,851 (9.63%)
  - Indian Tamil: 2,182 (2.37%)
  - Sri Lankan Moors: 1,760 (1.91%)
  - Other: 73 (0.08%)

Religion (2012 census)
  - Hindu: 69,628 (75.73%)
  - Christian: 11,989 (13.04%)
  - Buddhist: 8,155 (8.87%)
  - Muslim: 2,013 (2.19%)
  - Other: 162 (0.18%)
- Time zone: UTC+05:30 (Sri Lanka)
- Post Codes: 42000-42999
- ISO 3166 code: LK-45
- Vehicle registration: NP
- Official Languages: Tamil, Sinhala
- Website: Mullaitivu District Secretariat

Mullaitivu District (Tamil: முல்லைத்தீவு மாவட்டம், Mullaittīvu Māvaṭṭam; Sinhala: මුලතිවු දිස්ත්‍රික්කය, Mulativu distrikkaya) is one of the 25 districts of Sri Lanka, the second level administrative division of the country. The district is administered by a District Secretariat headed by a District Secretary (previously known as a Government Agent) appointed by the central government of Sri Lanka. The capital of the district is the town of Mullaitivu.

== History ==
Parts of present-day Mullaitivu District were ruled by the pre-colonial Jaffna kingdom. The district then came under Portuguese, Dutch and British control. In 1815 the British gained control of the entire island of Ceylon. They divided the island into three ethnic based administrative structures: Low Country Sinhalese, Kandyan Sinhalese and Tamil. The district, which was then part of Vanni District, was part of the Tamil administration. In 1833, in accordance with the recommendations of the Colebrooke-Cameron Commission, the ethnic based administrative structures were unified into a single administration divided into five geographic provinces. Vanni District, together with Jaffna District and Mannar District, formed the new Northern Province.

Vanni District was later renamed Mullaitivu District and then Vavuniya District. The district was colonised in the second half of the 18th century by residents from Jaffna Peninsula, primarily from Alaveddy, Udupiddy and Navaly. At the time that Ceylon gained independence, Vavuniya was one of the three districts located in the Northern Province. Mullaitivu District was carved out of the northern part of Vavuniya District together with parts of the then Jaffna District, Mannar District and Trincomalee District in September 1978.

Mullaitivu District was under the control of rebel Liberation Tigers of Tamil Eelam for many years during the civil war. The district was recaptured by the Sri Lankan military in early 2009.

== Geography ==
Mullaitivu District is located in the north east of Sri Lanka in the Northern Province. It has an area of 2,617 square kilometres (1,010 sq mi).

== Administrative units ==
Mullaitivu District is divided into 6 Divisional Secretary's Division (DS Divisions), each headed by a Divisional Secretary (previously known as an Assistant Government Agent). The DS Divisions are further sub-divided into 136 Grama Niladhari Divisions (GN Divisions).

DS Division	Main Town	Divisional Secretary	GN Divisions	Area (km^{2})	Population (2012 Census)						Population Density (/km^{2})
DS Division	Main Town	Divisional Secretary	GN Divisions	Area (km^{2})	Sri Lankan Tamil	Sinhalese	Indian Tamil	Sri Lankan Moors	Other	Total	Population Density (/km^{2})
Manthai East	Pandiyankulam	N.Ranjana	15	515	6,277	10	634	8	0	6,929	
Maritimepattu	Mullaitivu	M.Umamagal	46	744	25,976	1,071	150	1,678	34	28,909	
Oddusuddan	Oddusuddan	P.Jeyarani	27	639	14,158		792	51	31	15,658	
Puthukkudiyiruppu	Puthukkudiyiruppu	S.jeyakanth	19	371	23,480	50	215	19	6	23,770	
Thunukkai	Thunukkai	A.Lathumeera	20	344	9,180	157	391	2	2	9,732	
Weli Oya (Manal Aru)	Ehatugaswewa		9	180	10	6,937	0	2	0	6,949	
Total			136	2,617	79,081	8,851	2,182	1,760	73	91,947	35

== Demographics ==
=== Population ===
Mullaitivu District's population was 91,947 in 2012. The population of the district is mostly Sri Lankan Tamil.

The population of the district, like the rest of the north and east of Sri Lanka, has been heavily affected by the civil war. The war killed an estimated 100,000 people. Several hundred thousand Sri Lankan Tamils, possibly as many as one million, emigrated to India or to the West during the war. Many Sri Lankan Tamils also moved to the relative safety of the capital Colombo. Most of the Sri Lankan Moors and Sinhalese who lived in the district fled to other parts of Sri Lanka or were forcibly expelled by the rebel Liberation Tigers of Tamil Eelam, though most of them have returned to the district since the end of the civil war.

=== Ethnicity ===
Population of Mullaitivu District by ethnic group 1981 to 2012
Year	Tamil (Note: Sri Lankan Tamil and Indian Tamil.)		Sinhalese		Muslim (Note: Sri Lankan Moors and Indian Moors.)		Other		Total No.
Year	No.	%	No.	%	No.	%	No.	%	Total No.
1981 Census	69,670	89.88%	3,948	5.09%	3,777	4.87%	117	0.15%	77,512
1999 Estimate	n/a	n/a	n/a	n/a	n/a	n/a	n/a	n/a	184,655
2000 Estimate	n/a	n/a	n/a	n/a	n/a	n/a	n/a	n/a	187,281
2001 Estimate (Note: 2001 Census was not carried out in Mullaitivu District.)	n/a	n/a	n/a	n/a	n/a	n/a	n/a	n/a	180,401
2002 Estimate	n/a	n/a	n/a	n/a	n/a	n/a	n/a	n/a	144,959
2003 Estimate	140,556	99.92%	23	0.02%	49	0.03%	47	0.03%	140,675
2004 Estimate	152,724	99.83%	0	0.00%	237	0.15%	29	0.02%	152,990
2005 Estimate	157,410	99.77%	0	0.00%	365	0.23%	0	0.00%	157,775
2006 Estimate	214,713	99.75%	1	0.00%	547	0.25%	0	0.00%	215,261
2007 Estimate	220,117	99.91%	1	0.00%	193	0.09%	0	0.00%	220,311
2008 Estimate (Note: Excludes Maritimepattu, Puthukudiyiruppu and Thunukkai divisions - no data available.)	51,737	99.99%	0	0.00%	4	0.01%	0	0.00%	51,741
2009 Estimate (Note: Excludes Maritimepattu and Puthukudiyiruppu divisions - no data available.)	36,741	100.00%	0	0.00%	0	0.00%	0	0.00%	36,741
2011 Enumeration	60,136	90.39%	3,966	5.96%	2,390	3.59%	34	0.05%	66,526
2012 Census	81,263	88.38%	8,851	9.63%	1,760	1.91%	73	0.08%	91,947

=== Religion ===
Population of Mullaitivu District by religion 1981 to 2012
Year	Hindu		Christian (Note: Roman Catholic and Other Christian.)		Buddhist		Muslim		Others		Total No.
Year	No.	%	No.	%	No.	%	No.	%	No.	%	Total No.
1981 Census	60,117	77.88%	12,211	15.82%	1,060	1.37%	3,789	4.91%	12	0.02%	77,189
2012 Census	69,628	75.73%	11,989	13.04%	8,155	8.87%	2,013	2.19%	162	0.18%	91,947

=== Poverty ===
In 2016 the district was one of the poorest in Sri Lanka and had the second-highest incidence of extreme poverty according to the World Bank.

== Politics and government ==
=== Local government ===
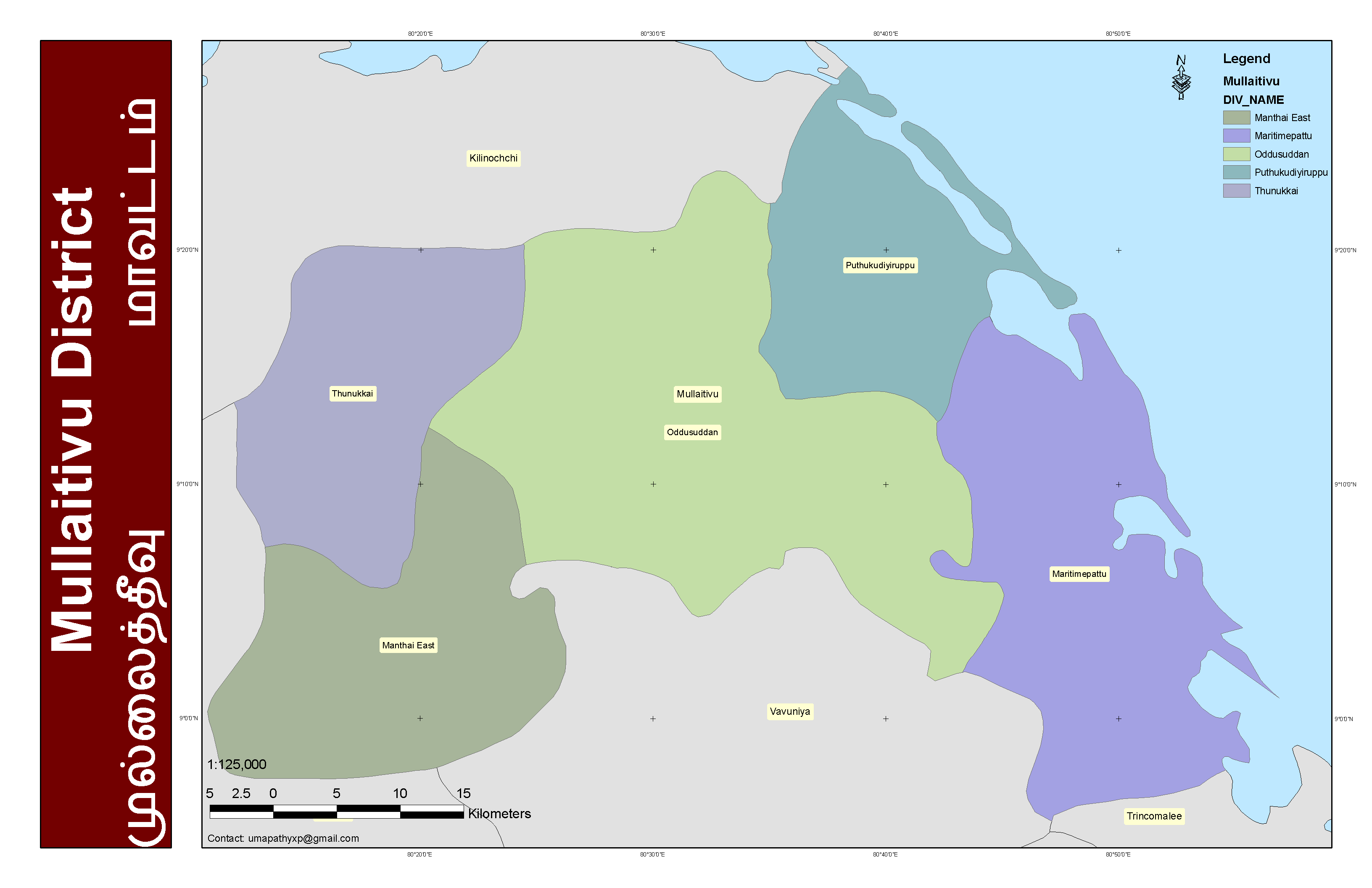
DS Divisions of Mullaitivu District, 2006

Mullaitivu District has four local authorities, all of which are Divisional Councils (Pradesha Sabhai or Pradeshiya Sabha).

Local Authority	Area (km^{2})	Population (2011)	Registered Electors (2011)	Elected Members (2011)		
Local Authority	Area (km^{2})	Population (2011)	Registered Electors (2011)	TNA	UPFA (Note: Includes Citizen's Front.)	Total
Manthai East Divisional Council	494.0	6,715	5,578	6	3	9
Maritimepattu Divisional Council	728.6	25,405				
Puthukkudiyiruppu Divisional Council	968.0	22,110				
Thunukkai Divisional Council	326.3	9,126	5,227	7	2	9
Total	2,516.9	63,356		13	5	18
