= Battle of Thoppigala =

2007 battle during the Sri Lankan Civil War

- Part of the Sri Lankan Civil War
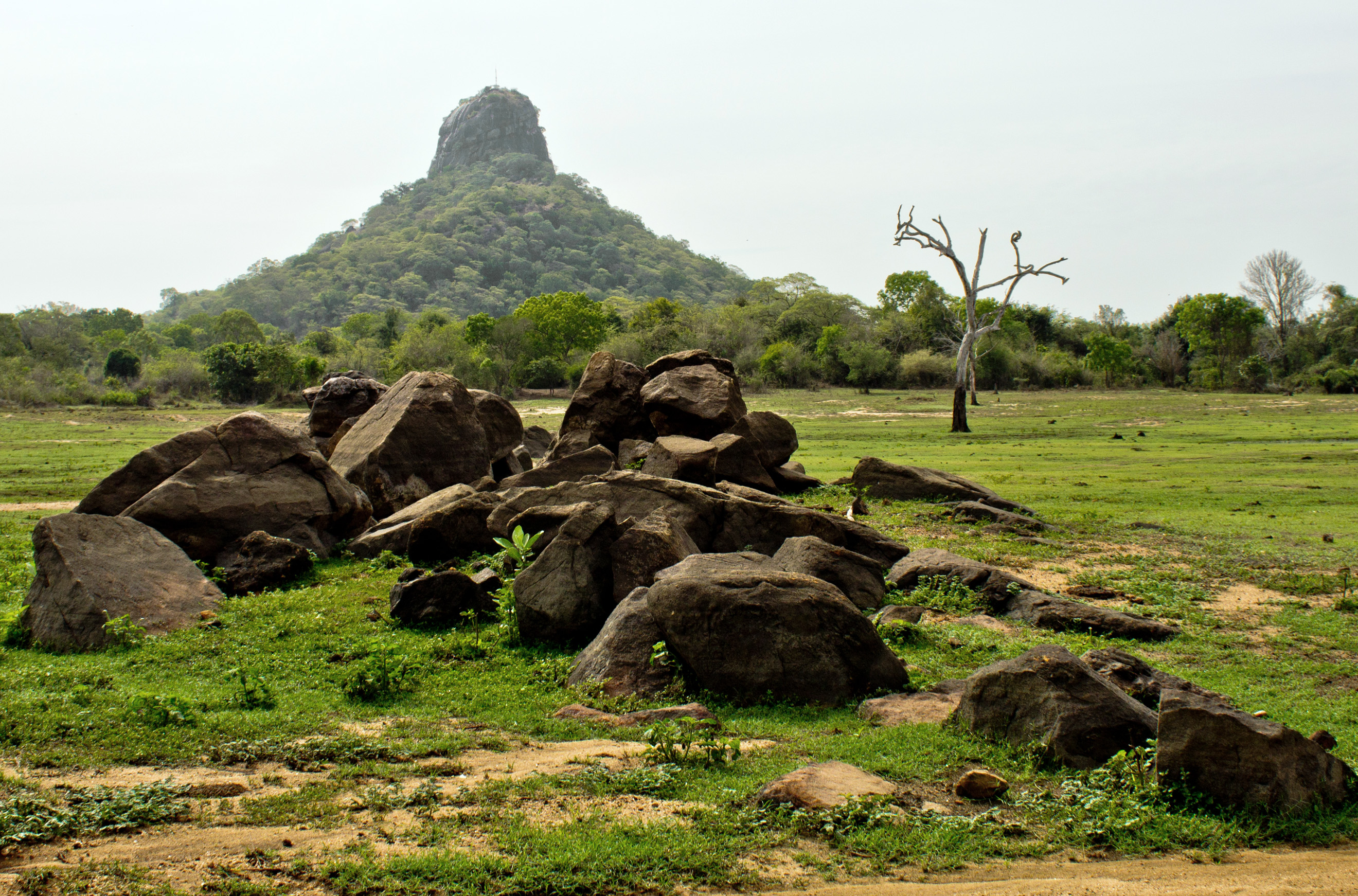
- Thoppigala
Date	25 April – 11 July 2007
Location	Thoppigala, Sri Lanka
Result	Sri Lankan Army victory

Belligerents
Sri Lanka	Liberation Tigers of Tamil Eelam

Commanders and leaders
Gen. Sarath Fonseka, Maj. Gen. Parakrama Pannipitiya	Brig. Swarnam, Brig. Ramesh

Units involved
Sri Lanka Armed Forces: Sri Lanka Army; Gemunu Watch; 6th Battalion; 7th Battalion; 8th Battalion; 9th Battalion; 53 Division; 58 Division; 61 Division; Task Force 8; Commando Regiment; 3rd Commando Regiment; Deep Penetration Unit; SIO Team; Artillery Regiment; Sri Lanka Armoured Corps; 5th Regiment; Sri Lanka Air Force	Unknown

Strength
Around 1,200	Around 1,000

Casualties and losses
48 killed (according to Sri Lankan Army)	700–800 killed (according to Sri Lankan Army)

The Battle of Thoppigala took place between the Sri Lankan Army and the Liberation Tigers of Tamil Eelam (LTTE) during the first half of 2007 over control of the LTTE-dominated peak of Thoppigala (also known as Baron's Cap), located 40 km northwest of Batticaloa in eastern Sri Lanka.

== Background ==
Thoppigala, also known as Baron's Cap and Kudumbimalai, is a large rock standing at 1,753 feet (534 m) above sea level. The rock is surrounded by thick jungle and rocky terrain and has a number of natural caves. When the Indian Peace Keeping Force (IPKF) was active in the country during the period of 1987–1990, they had carried out operations in the Thoppigala area to find LTTE cadres hiding there. However, General A.S. Kalkat, the then commander of the IPKF, later said that they had made no attempt to capture the area since it had been of no military significance to them.

During 1993, the Sri Lankan military conducted operations in the east to evict the LTTE from the region. Military bases were established in and around Thoppigala during these operations.

With the start of Eelam War IV, the Sri Lankan military started a campaign to capture the Eastern Province from the LTTE. The Sri Lankan Army captured the town of Sampur and surrounding areas on 3 September 2006, followed by the capture of Vakarai on 19 January 2007. The Police Special Task Force launched an operation codenamed Definite Victory through which the Sri Lankan military captured several LTTE bases. The LTTE was eventually restricted to the Thoppigala area, which had become its last stronghold in the Eastern Province, by 11 April 2007. One of the largest LTTE bases in the eastern province was located in the Thoppigala area.

== Preparations ==
On 27 February 2007, the LTTE launched an artillery attack on Batticaloa targeting two helicopters carrying foreign diplomats. Ambassadors of the United States, Italy and Germany were injured in this incident. The LTTE later announced that they were not aware of the diplomats arriving at Batticaloa and accused the government of not informing them. The LTTE also claimed that the Sri Lankan military had used the targeted location to launch provocative artillery attacks earlier on the same day. In response to this, a government spokesman said that "Everyone knew that foreign diplomats were visiting the area today". The Sri Lankan Air Force later bombed the Thoppigala area, which the military said was used to organize the attacks.

Thoppigala was isolated and cut off from reinforcements after the Sri Lankan Army captured several LTTE bases around it. The army captured the Unnachchi tank, LTTE bases at Vavunathivu and Kohombagasthalawa, 33 kilometres (21 mi) of the A5 road and the road leading to Thoppigala, by 11 April 2007.

The Sri Lankan Army announced that they had launched a military operation to capture Thoppigala on 14 April 2007. LRRP units from the Army Commando Regiment were used extensively in this operation, making it the first operation in the civil war where such deep penetration units were used on a large scale. Four eight-member teams from Zulu Company of the 3 Commando Regiment were deployed to eliminate LTTE leaders and disrupt supplies and communications.

The SLA estimated around 1,000 LTTE cadres were fighting in the area in a network of trenches and tunnels.

During the period of 8–9 June 2007, the Sri Lankan Army captured four LTTE military bases at Ibbanvila, Akkarathivu (Egodadoova), Mawadi-ode (Mahavaedi-oda), and Veppanveli (Kohomba-vaella) in Pankudavaella North, and Naarakmulla, south of the Thoppigala area. During the confrontation, around 30 LTTE cadres and one SLA personnel were killed. The SLA captured six Multi Purpose Machine Guns (MPMG), 21 T-56 assault rifles, four rocket-propelled grenade (RPG) launchers, and a large quantity of anti-personnel (AP) mines and ammunitions.

On 19 June 2007, three LTTE satellite camps east of Narakkamulla in the Thoppigala area were completely destroyed by the SLA. As per military sources around 25–30 LTTE were killed and a large quantity of anti-personnel mines (APMs) and other military equipment were captured.

== Battle ==
Fierce fighting erupted between the LTTE and the SLA at the final forward defence line (FDL) of LTTE, at their Beirut complex in Narakamulla, Thoppigala area between 22 and 24 June 2007. The FDL was fortified with six bunker lines and three minor camps. The LTTE did not vacate their positions due to the SLA's heavy barrage of artillery and tank gun fire. Finally, around 50 SLA commandos infiltrated the LTTE bunkers and killed 30 of them. Three LTTE cadres committed suicide. This series of events turned the tide of the battle of Thoppigala against the LTTE.

The fierce battle north of Narakamulla, in the Thoppigala area on the morning of 6 July 2007, killed six Sri Lankan Army personnel including Colonel Samantha Ranathunga, and injured seven others, due to heavy mortar fire by the LTTE. The Sri Lankan military retaliated with artillery and aerial bombardment to control the situation.

After 13 years, the Sri Lankan military captured Thoppigala (Baron's Cap), the final stronghold of the LTTE in the east, on the morning of 11 July 2007, after nearly a year of military action. According to the country's military history, the Indian Peace Keeping Force (IPKF), with around 20,000 soldiers, attacked this area in the year 1988 but failed to capture the area (at that time the LTTE was led by Colonel Karuna). In 1994 the SLA withdrew their military bases from this area.

== Aftermath ==
The entire Eastern Province was captured by the Sri Lankan military following the capture of Thoppigala. The military launched a campaign focusing on the aim of capturing the Northern Province after the Eastern Province was captured.

Demining operations were carried out with the aid of foreign governments and non-governmental organizations, and are currently in their final phases.

== See also ==
- List of Sri Lankan Civil War battles
