= Eastern Theatre of Eelam War IV =

Conflict between Sri lanka and the LTTE

- Part of the Eelam War IV
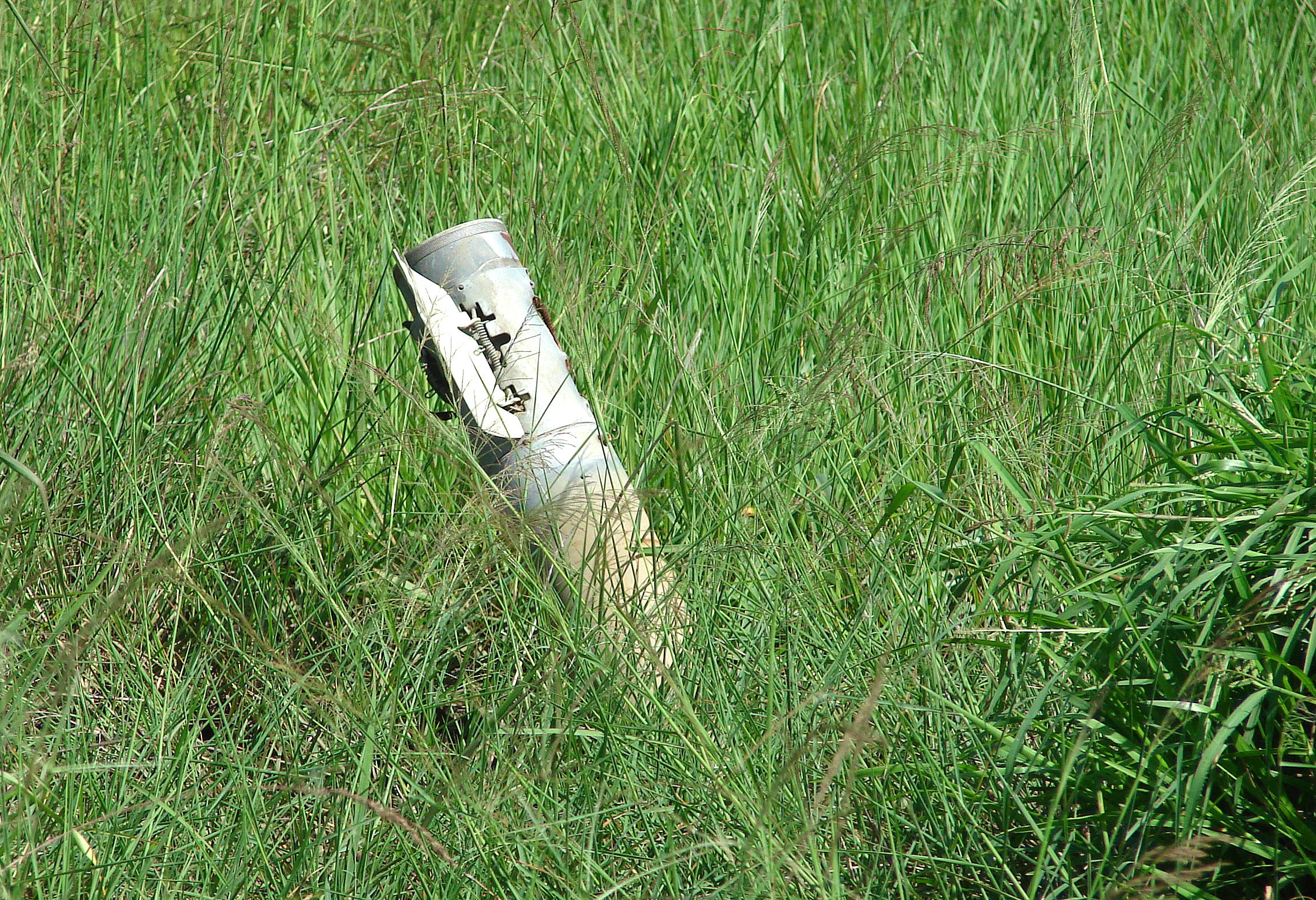
- An unexploded 122mm projectile from a multiple rocket launcher stuck into muddy ground in Vaharai, Batticaloa.
Date	July 21, 2006 – July 11, 2007
Location	Sri Lanka
Result	Sri Lankan Military victory

Belligerents
Sri Lanka Tamil Makkal Viduthalai Pulikal	Liberation Tigers of Tamil Eelam

Commanders and leaders
General Sarath Fonseka, Major General Parakrama Pannipitiya (Sri Lanka) Karuna Amman	Brigadier Sornam, Brigadier Bhanu

Units involved
Sri Lanka Armed Forces; Sri Lanka Army; 53 Division; 58 Division; Task Force 8; Commando Regiment; Deep Penetration Unit; Artillery Regiment; Sri Lanka Navy; Sri Lanka Air Force; Sri Lanka Police; Special Task Force	Liberation Tigers of Tamil Eelam; Charles Anthony Brigade; Jeyanthan Brigade; Sea Tigers; Air Tigers; Black Tigers

Strength
20,000 (approx.)	3,000 (approx.)

The Eastern Theatre of Eelam War IV started in the Eastern province of Sri Lanka on July 21, 2006, when the LTTE cut off the water supply to rice fields in eastern Trincomalee district. The government claimed total control of the Eastern province after capturing Thoppigala (Baron's cap) on July 11, 2007, after nearly a year of fighting. Major battles took place at Sampoor, Vakarai, Kanchikudicharu, Kokkadichloai and Thoppigala. Military and civilian deaths were relatively low on both sides. Government forces captured much military hardware from the LTTE during the conflict. The civilians managed to flee the combat zones, and this reduced civilian casualties, while swelling the number of internally displaced people (IDP). The world health organization (WHO) estimated ~200,300 IDPs, and claims that significant progress occurred in resettling them. The LTTE vowed to attack Sri Lanka's military and economic targets across the country to retaliate for the capture of the Eastern province from them. This was stated by the leader of the LTTE's political wing, S.P. Thamilchelvan, in a statement to Associated Press on July 12, 2007.

== Beginning of the war ==
A new crisis leading to the first large-scale fighting since signing of the ceasefire occurred when the LTTE closed the sluice gates of the Mavil Aru (Mavil Oya) reservoir on July 21 and cut the water supply to 15,000 villages in government controlled areas. After the initial negotiations by the SLMM to open the gates failed, the Air Force attacked LTTE positions on July 26, and ground troops began an operation to open the gates. government spokesman, stated that the government remained committed to the cease-fire. Likewise, the LTTE also claimed that they were committed to the ceasefire

The sluice gates were eventually reopened on August 8, with conflicting reports as to who actually opened them. Initially, the SLMM claimed that they managed to persuade the LTTE to lift the waterway blockade conditionally. However a government spokesman said that "utilities can not be used as bargaining tools" by the rebels and the government forces launched fresh attacks on LTTE positions around the reservoir. These attacks prompted condemnation from SLMM Chief of Staff, who stated "(The government does) have the information that the LTTE has made this offer,"... "It is quite obvious they are not interested in water. They are interested in something else." As the battle warmed up, the LTTE claimed that they opened the sluice gates "on humanitarian grounds" although this was disputed by military correspondents, who stated that the water began flowing immediately after the security forces carried out a precise bombing of the Mavil Oya anicut. Eventually, following heavy fighting with the rebels, government troops gained full control of the Mavil Oya reservoir on August 15.

== Battle of Muttur and Sampur ==
The Sri Lankan military gained control the Sampur town of eastern Trincomalee district on September 4, 2006, where the area used by LTTE as an artillery launching pad to attack Trincomalee port. The SLA military offensive began in August 2006 and the area was under LTTE control for years. President Mahinda Rajapaksa announced capturing of Sampur as he addressed the 55th annual conference of the ruling SLFP.

The battle of Sampoor, close to Muttur, lasted nearly a month. The SLA gained control of the area on September 4, 2006, after heavy fighting.

== SLA December 2006 Offensive ==
In December 2006, the Sri Lanka Army (SLA) launched multi-pronged attacks in an attempt to capture territory in Vaharai and the Trincomalee District held by the Liberation Tigers of Tamil Eelam (LTTE).LTTE repulsed this offensive and cause 70 SLA dead and 175 SLA wounded with losing their own 4 cadres. SLA Bombardment resulted in death of 40 civilians.

== Battle of Vakarai ==
The Sri Lankan military announced the capture of Vakarai, a coastal town of eastern Batticaloa district, on January 19, 2007, the military has accused the LTTE of using civilians in the Vakarai hospital as a human shield and also using the hospital premises as an artillery launching pad. The SLA's battle to take Vakarai (Vaakare) lasted nearly 3 months from October 30, 2006, until January 15, 2007. Vakarai (Vaakare) is a coastal city in the Batticaloa (Madakalapuva) district where the LTTE had clamped their own civil administration and police for some time.

Per Sri Lankan military sources, the military operation launched to gain the area of Vakarai from LTTE was conducted in two phases. The first phase was to facilitate the movement of civilians into the area under the Sri Lankan army (SLA). The Deep Penetration Unit (DPU) of the SLA infiltrated the area under the LTTE, and launched surprise attacks on them. This tactic caused the LTTE to engage with the SLA instead of holding the civilians (hostages) from fleeing into the SLA control zone. Phase II started on December 4, 2006, where the SLA troops advanced in three fronts from Trikonamadu (Thrikonamaduva), Kirimichchiya (Kirimaetiyaava), and Kadjuwatte, then cleared off 15 km into the Trikonamadu jungle. During this action, LTTE targets at Kaddamuravikulam, Karuvappanchenai and Madurankernikulam were destroyed. The second advance of SLA started on December 9, 2006, from Mahindapura Southwards and captured LTTE camps around Echchalanpaththuwa area. The 3rd and 4th advances of SLA started on December 10, 2006, from Trikonamadu and Kadjuwatta onwards.

== Battle of Ampara-Kanchikudiyaaru or Kanchikudicharu ==
The military operation to consolidate the GOSL's control of Amparai code named as "Operation Definite Victory" took place in the Ampara district, in the Lahugala jungles. The Special Task Force also known as the STF was involved in the operation that captured the Kanchikudicharu LTTE military complex during the first week of January 2007 STF troops captured around 20 LTTE camps including major bases such as Janak, Stanley and the Jeevan base. These complexes provided infrastructure for LTTE military cadres in the area.

After capturing large infrastructure facility of the LTTE, the STF troops found a truck and a motorcycle packed with explosives. The military believed that these items were prepared for a suicide attack in Colombo. The STF also recovered large quantity of arms and ammunition, coffins, anti-personnel mines, radio receivers, global positioning systems, Power generators, boats with name and logo of the NGO "Save the Children", tents with the logo of "UNHCR", and a fully equipped hospital named by the Tigers as Thileepan Memorial Hospital donated by a Dutch INGO named ZOA Refugee Care.

== Battle of Thoppigala ==
The dominating peak in the area is called Thoppigala (British called it Baron's cap, tamils called it Kudumbimalai). It is situated near the Batticaloa–Polonnaruwa border close to Maduru Oya the Sri Lankan military's largest infantry training base. The area is ~800 square kilometres, with rocky mountains (Dimbulagala - Lahugala range), dense jungles and also ancient irrigation tanks. The Sri Lankan military launched their military operation to capture the area from LTTE on April 25, 2007. The full scale jungle warfare started, and the LTTE was trying to protect their last stronghold in Eastern Sri Lanka. The SLA estimated around 500-700 LTTE cadres were fighting in the area in a network of trenches and tunnels.

=== Capture of LTTE bases ===
During the period of June 8–9, 2007 Sri Lankan army captured 4 LTTE military bases at Ibbanvila, Akkarathivu, Mawadi-ode, and Veppanveli in Pankudavaella North, and Naarakmulla, South of the Thoppigala area. During the confrontation, around 30 LTTE cadres and 1 SLA personnel died. The SLA captured 06 Multi Purpose Machine Guns (MPMG), 21 T-56 assault rifles, 04 Rocket Propeller Grenade (RPG) launchers, and a large quantity of Anti Personnel (AP) mines and Ammunitions

On June 19, 2007, 03 LTTE satellite camps East of Narakkamulla in the Thoppigala area were completely destroyed by the SLA. As per military sources around 25-30 LTTE were killed and a large quantity of anti-personnel mines (APM's) and other military equipment were captured.

=== Final assault ===
Fierce fighting erupted between the LTTE and the SLA at the final forward defence line (FDL) of LTTE, at their Beirut complex in Narakamulla, Thoppigala area between June 22–24, 2007. The FDL was fortified with 6 bunker lines and 3 minor camps. The LTTE did not vacate their positions due to SLA's heavy barrage of artillery and tank gun fire. Finally, around 50 SLA commando's infiltrated the LTTE bunkers and killed 30 of them. Three LTTE cadres committed suicide. This series of events turned the tide of the battle of Thoppogala against the LTTE.

A fierce battle north of Narakamulla, in the Thoppigala area, on July 6, 2007, killed six Sri Lankan army personnel and injured seven, due to heavy mortar fire by the LTTE. The Sri Lankan military retaliated with artillery and aerial bombardment to control the situation.

=== Capture of Thoppigala (Baron's Cap) ===
After 13 years, the Sri Lankan military captured the final stronghold of LTTE in the East, Thoppigala (Baron's Cap), on the morning of July 11, 2007, nearly after a year of military action. According to the country's military history, the Indian Peace Keeping Force (IPKF), with around 20,000 soldiers attacked this area in the year 1988 but failed to capture the area (at that time LTTE was led by Colonel Karuna). In 1994 the SLA withdrew their military bases from this area.

=== Comments about the battle ===
The opposition leader of the Sri Lanka Parliament Ranil Wickremasinghe criticized the government for treating the capture of Thoppigala as a matter of national significance. He stated at a public gathering at Galle, the capital of southern Sri Lanka, that Thoppigala is a jungle area larger than the district of Colombo, with no other significance. However, in September 2007 the United National Party (UNP) led by Wickremasinghe announced a change of party policy, abandoning its federalist policy stand "in view of the LTTE defeat in the east. This itself shows the far-reaching implications of the war in the Eastern theatre.

== Commemoration of the victory in east ==
The government of Sri Lanka commemorated the military defeat of the LTTE, in Eastern province of the country in the morning of July 19, 2007, called "New Dawn to the East ". It took place in the country's capital, Colombo, around Independence Square where the military parade passes. There were several commemoration ceremonies organized throughout the country on the same day. The government suggested hoisting the country's flag in every house and also lighting an oil lamp at auspicious time for the people who sacrificed their lives for the nation.

President Mahinda Rajapaksa addressing the nation stated, "Let us bequeath to them a land where Sinhalese, Tamils and Muslims can live together and smile as the children of one mother. It is not possible to bring liberation to the Tamil people through guns, bombs and cyanide capsules. What they destroy is the future of Tamil children". The display of the military equipment and the parade inclusive of various the military units were some of the focal points of the ceremony. The display of air-force fighter planes as the final event of the ceremony. The ceremony has to be viewed in the context of the large political and military implications of the aftermath of the LTTE defeat in the east.

== Assassinations ==
- Head priest of the Santhiveli Pilleyar Kovil, Selliah Kurukkal Parameshwaran, on February 7, 2007, in his home in Batticaloa. He had blessed President Mahinda Rajapakse during his visit to Vakarai four days earlier. As per police investigations, the murderers identified themselves as LTTE and forcibly dragged him out of his house and shot him to death. The TULF leader Anandasangraee himself attributed the murder to the LTTE and strongly condemned the LTTE.
- Chief Secretary of the Eastern Province, Herath Abeyweera, on July 16, 2007, around 18:00 hrs at his office located at Inner Harbour Road in Trincomalee. The police blamed the LTTE for this assassination. He had worked as the District Secretary of Ampara for more than 15 years and served the Sinhalese, Tamil and Muslim people of the East with great commitment.

== Impact of war on civilian life ==
Because of the clashes between LTTE and the Sri Lankan army at Eastern province there were around 35,000 people of 10,000 families internally displaced from Sampoor (Muthur), Seruvilla, Verugal (Echchalampattu) and Vakarai areas. The period of heavy clashes happened from December 2006 to April 2007, many people left their homes and arrived in Sri Lankan government controlled areas.

== Political situation in East ==
After the Sri Lankan military gained control in the eastern province, the political situation within the Tamil society there dramatically changed. The many people living in the area were internally displaced (IDP) .The LTTE breakaway faction led by former LTTE Colonel Karuna would be more influential among the Tamil people. The political party named the Tamil Makkal Viduthalai Pulikal (TMVP) opened several political offices in the area.

The TMVP contested Batticaloa district local council election on March 10, 2008, and won all 9 councils with a high majority 70% of votes. The party also contested in Eastern Provincial Council election May 10, 2008 under the ruling UPFA banner and UPFA won the election. TMVP's current leader Sivanesathurai Chandrakanthan sworn as the Chief Minister of Eastern Provincial Council on May 16, 2008.

=== TMVP ideology ===
The anti-rebel Asian Tribune claimed that Karuna stated, "When we left the LTTE on 3 March 2004 we decided to enter into the mainstream politics of Sri Lanka. When we left the LTTE, we also gave up the policy of Separate state or Tamil Eelam. We do not believe in such a utopian politics any more. We today believe in rule of law, democracy and pluralism. Sri Lanka is our Motherland. We want to live equally with the majority Sinhalese and minority Muslims. We consider that it is our duty respect the country’s constitution and also the President and the Government of Sri Lanka".

== See also ==
- Sri Lankan Civil War
- Eelam War IV

== Notes ==
- Al Jazeera's Tony Birtley's exclusive
