= Snowy (military dog) =

Sri Lanka Army tracking dog

- Species: Canis lupus familiaris
- Breed: Golden Labrador Retriever
- Sex: Male
- Born: 2 March 2004; Commando Regiment Headquarters, Ganemulla
- Died: 24 May 2011 (aged 7); Commando Regiment Headquarters
- Nationality: Sri Lanka
- Employer: Sri Lanka Army
- Notable role: Tracking dog
- Years active: 2004 – 2011
- Owner: Sri Lanka Army Commando Regiment
- Awards: Rana Wickrama Padakkama

Snowy RWP, also known as Commando Snowy (service number S/080), was a Golden Labrador Retriever who served as a tracking dog for the Sri Lanka Army during the Sri Lankan Civil War. Snowy was attached to the 4th Commando regiment and handled by Lance corporal D. H. P. Sampath. After serving in various fronts of the war, Snowy was injured by a grenade on 15 March 2008 while tracking an LTTE infiltration unit in Kambilioya, Weli Oya. Snowy received a Rana Wickrama Padakkama medal for his actions, the first dog to receive such an honour in Sri Lankan military history. He died on 24 May 2011 while recuperating from injuries received during a mission.

== Military service ==
Snowy was born on 2 March 2004 at the Commando Regiment Headquarters in Ganemulla. He began training in September of that year under handler Lance corporal D.H.P. Sampath, with the supervision of Captain Vimukthi Jayasinghe. Snowy's first deployment was to the Jaffna Peninsula. In 2006, he was credited with discovering a hidden ammunition dump in Neduntheevu, and finding an LTTE safehouse and weapons cache at the University of Jaffna. Snowy also helped track suspects during bomb attacks in the Jaffna area.

In 2007 he was engaged in the Battle of Thoppigala, helping Long Range Reconnaissance Patrol (LRRP) units track down fleeing LTTE units. Snowy assisted commandos in a successful ambush at Morawewa. He successfully tracked an LTTE infiltration unit that attacked the Thalgasmankada military detachment inside the Yala National Park.

== Welioya action and injury ==
On 14 March 2008 at 3.30 pm, a six-man LTTE infiltration unit of the Jeyanthan Brigade ambushed troops attached to the 5th Battalion, Sri Lanka Light Infantry (5-SLLI) in Nikawewa near Welioya. A soldier was injured but troops repelled the attack. During subsequent search operations troops recovered the body of an LTTE cadre. Receiving the news, Sri Lanka Army High Command called for the assistance of tracking dogs to locate the remaining LTTE cadres. On 15 March, dogs Snowy and Bonnie, handled by Lance Corporal D.H.P. Sampath and Lance Corporal G.S. Priyankara, arrived at 223 Brigade Headquarters in Welioya. They departed with an 8-man team from the Delta squadron, 2nd Special Forces Regiment and another 8-man team from the 5th Battalion, Sri Lanka Light Infantry.

Snowy led the search using the scent of recovered objects left behind by the infiltration unit. Two 8-man teams were sent to flank the rear with Bonnie. Around 3.45 pm Snowy suddenly charged a bush where an LTTE cadre was hiding. After firing several shots the LTTE cadre exploded a grenade injuring both Snowy and his handler. Despite his wounds, Snowy continued with his search, but realizing the gravity of the injuries Lance Corporal Priyankara withdrew Snowy to get medical assistance.

== Recovery and death ==
Snowy was first taken to Anuradhapura and later transferred to Veterinary Teaching Hospital at the University of Peradeniya, via ambulance. Around 11 pm he arrived at Peradeniya where a team of surgeons led by Professor Indira Silva was waiting. Eleven pieces of shrapnel were detected in his body damaging the lungs and bowels and lodging close to his heart. Snowy's brother Pet provided blood transfused to Snowy. Meanwhile, troops from the 4th commando unit videotaped Snowy's handler sending his greetings and wishes to Snowy and dispatched it to Peradeniya Hospital, so that Snowy could hear his master's voice and see his face. Gradually Snowy's injuries healed. Due to related disabilities he never returned to active duty and remained at Ganemulla Commando Regiment Headquarters. Snowy died on 24 May 2011 while recuperating.

== Recognition ==
Snowy received the Rana Wickrama Padakkama for his contributions in battle, the first military dog to receive such an honour in Sri Lanka.

=== Citation ===
This dog, during his period of service after being born in Sri Lanka, performed extremely well, throwing his full weight behind our success in many operations against terrorists and their hideouts. It is equivalent to a national commitment. His diverse services to this Regiment will continue to be remembered among Commandos. His great service for preservation of the country’s territorial integrity with high level of his intelligence, tracking skills and determined pursuing capabilities will continue to reverberate among us. His death is a great loss to handlers, fellow-tracking teams, Commando Regiment and the Army in general. While highly appreciating his invaluable services for the sake of peace in Sri Lanka, we (4 Commando Regiment) extend our heartfelt condolences on his demise and wish him attain Nirvana.

== See also ==
- List of individual dogs
- Teesha (Military dog)
