= Teesha =

Sri Lankan military dog

- Species: Canis lupus familiaris
- Breed: Golden Retriever
- Sex: Female
- Nationality: Sri Lanka
- Employer: Sri Lanka Army
- Notable role: Tracking dog
- Known for: Being the first Sri Lankan dog to complete a high-altitude parachute jump
- Owner: Sri Lanka Army Commando Regiment
- Residence: Commando Regiment Headquarters, Ganemulla

Teesha is a Sri Lankan military dog belonging to the country's Commando Regiment K-9 unit. She is a Golden Retriever, and was the first Sri Lankan dog to complete a high-altitude parachute jump on 21 November 2015, with Major Sujith Siranjeewa of the same regiment. Her record was made simultaneously with Siranjeewa's establishment of an Asian record for high-altitude parachuting, diving from an altitude of 4,000 feet (1,200 m) over the Uva-Kudaoya Commando Training Camp grounds.

== Military career ==
Teesha performed her duties as an explosive search dog for the 4th Commando Regiment during the country's civil war, helping track down enemy troops and explosives. She was, at a time, handled by Major Sujith Siranjeewa when he was Chief Instructor, Paratrooper Wing.

== Parachuting record ==
Teesha's jump was first mooted by Major Siranjeewa, a veteran Sri Lankan parachutist and part of the Commando Regiment's paratrooper complement. The request was initially considered for denial by the Army and Defence establishment over concerns that the dog's life was being put in danger, with possible injuries resulting from such action. Permission was eventually granted, and Siranjeewa and Teesha performed a rehearsal jump sometime before 21 November 2015 with no problems.

The actual jump was performed on 21 November at the Uva-Kudaoya Commando Training Camp grounds, as part of a tattoo in the passing out parade of 396 fresh Commando officers and troops. The pair were taken to 4,000 feet (1,200 m) on a Sri Lanka Air Force Mi-17 transport piloted by Flight Lieutenant Rajive Jayawickrama, and completed the jump successfully several minutes later, landing on the grounds of the training camp to applause from the audience.

The jump also earned Siranjeewa an Asian parachuting record.

== See also ==
- List of individual dogs
- Snowy (Military dog)
