= Kanchikudicharu =

Village in Sri Lanka

Kanchikudicharu கஞ்சிகுடிச்சாறு කන්චිකුටිචාරු
- Village
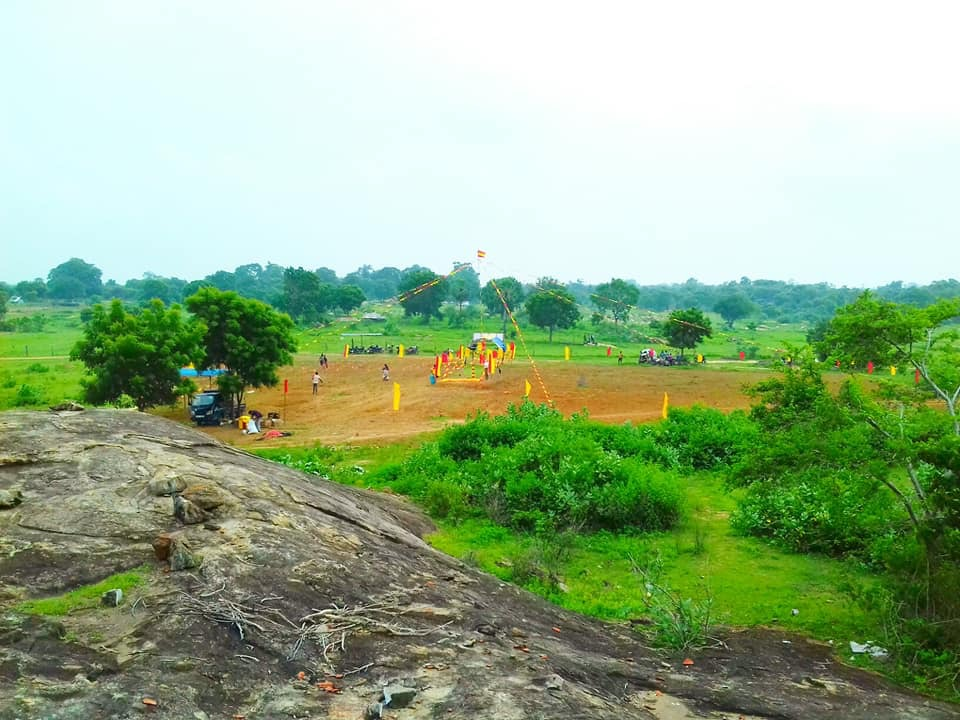

- Location within Sri Lanka
- Coordinates: 7°02′40″N 81°46′30″E
- Country: Sri Lanka
- Province: Eastern
- District: Ampara
- DS Division: Thirukkovil

Kanchikudicharu is a Tamil village in the Ampara District in the Eastern Province of Sri Lanka.

It is located 210 km (130 mi) east of the capital, Colombo.

2007 military action by the Liberation Tigers of Tamil Eelam The area was controlled by the Sri Lankan state forces. Kanchikudiyaru is the last captured area in the Eastern Province under the control of the Liberation Tigers of Tamil Eelam (LTTE).

People were resettled here in 2015, with up to 190 families residing in the village. Also land-based farming, livestock farming and milking are also livelihoods. Kanchikudicharu Tank is a biggest tank in this village.

== Agriculture ==
Mainly involved in paddy cultivation, Animal husbandry and Home gardening

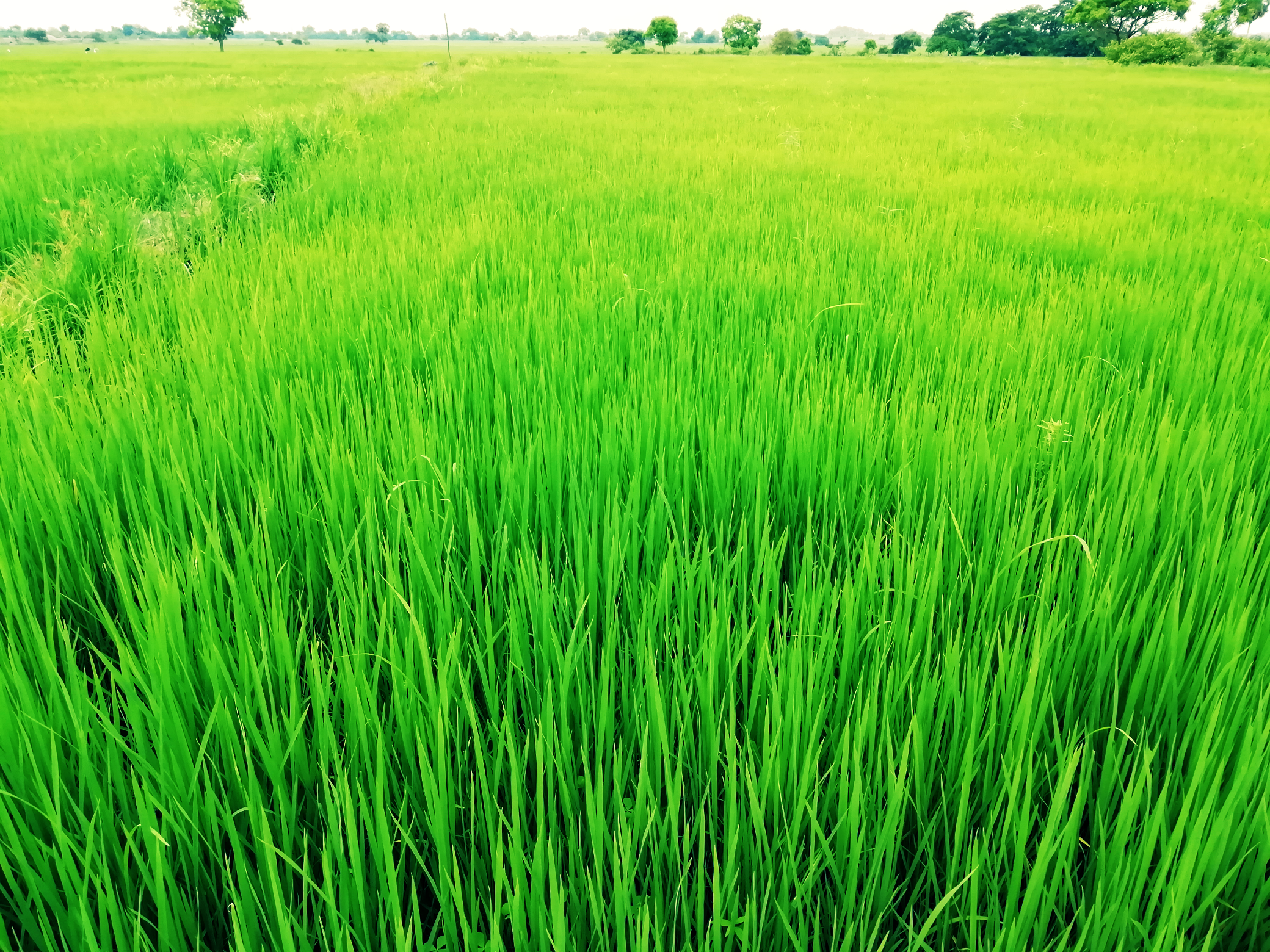
Paddy field in Kanchikudicharu

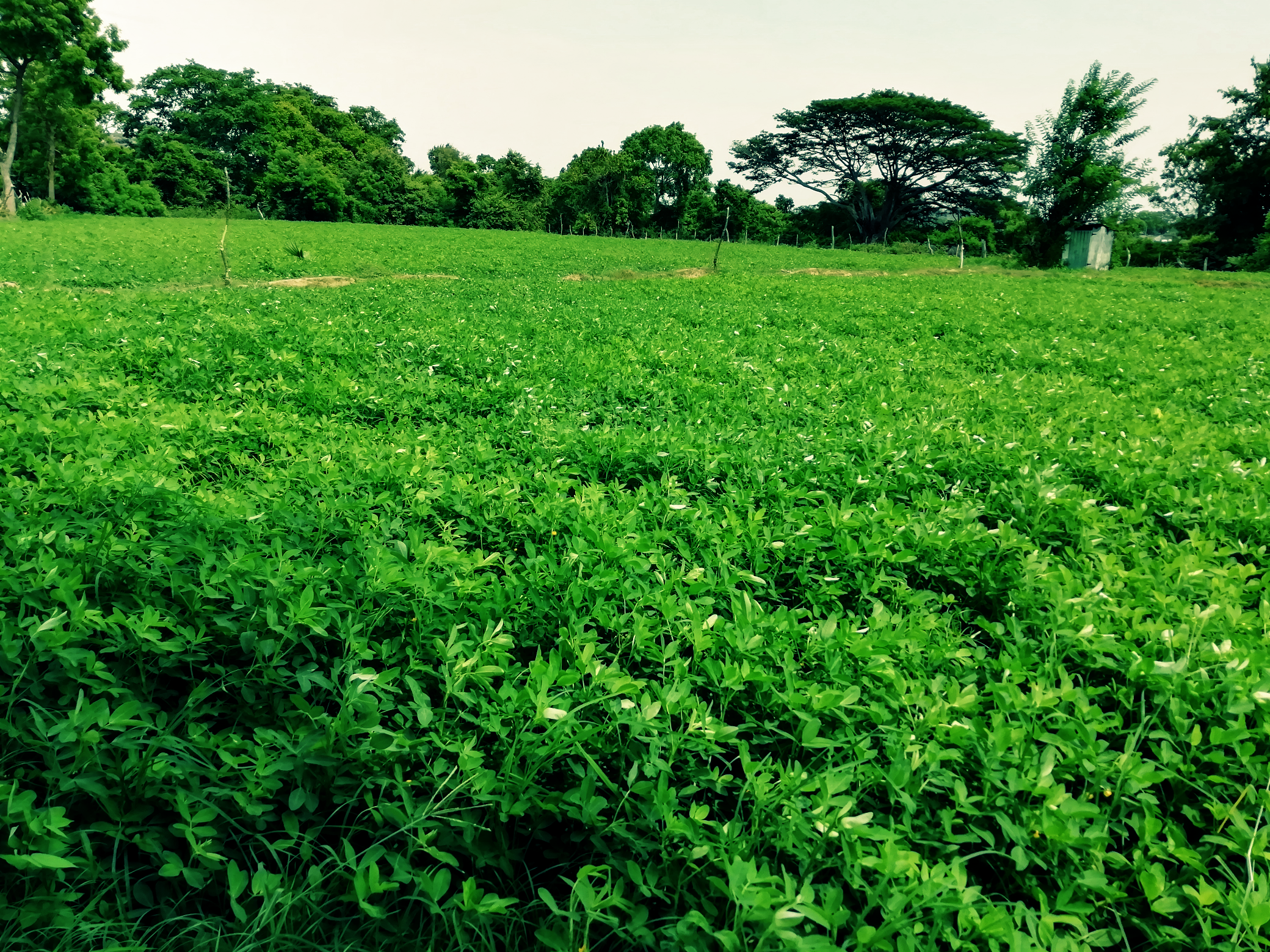
Peanut farming

== Education ==
- Kanchikudiyaru Ganesha Vidyalayam

== Religion ==
Everyone living here follows Shaivism.

- Murugan kovil
- Siddhivinayakar kovil
- Thanthondri Maagaparameshwary kovil
- Agora mariyamman kovil

== See also ==
- Eastern Theatre of Eelam War IV
- Seerpadar
- Operation Definite Victory
