= Seerpadar =

Tamil caste found chiefly in Eastern Sri Lanka

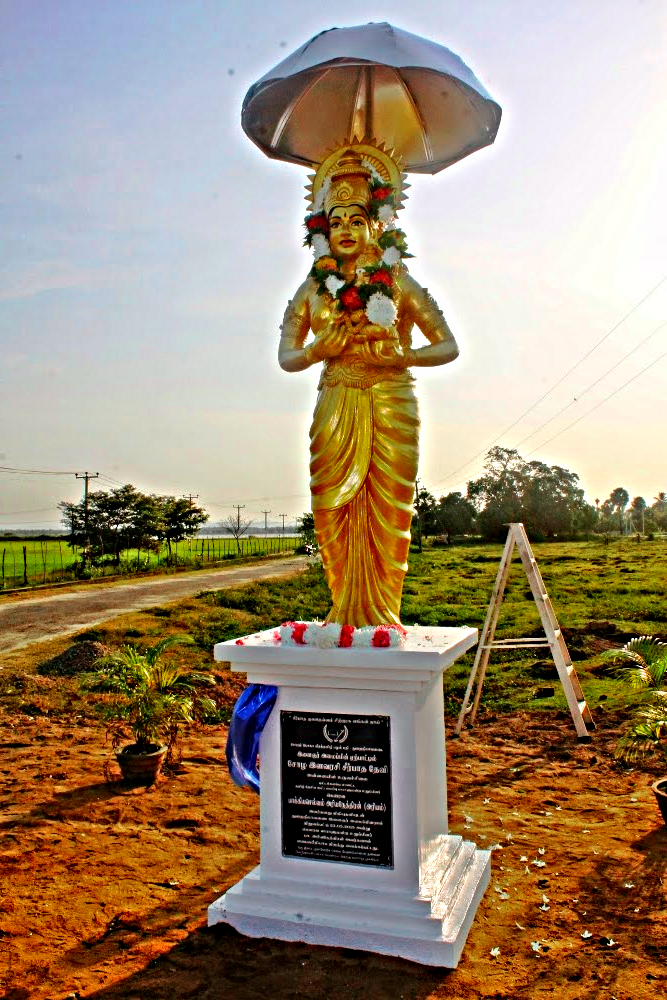
- Chola princess Seerpada Devi
- Religions: Shaivism
- Languages: Tamil

Seerpadar (also written as Cirpatar or Seerpadam) is a Tamil caste found in the coastal regions of Eastern Province in Sri Lanka. They are traditionally involved in farming. They are chiefly found in the Veeramunai, Mandur, Thuraineelavanai, Kalmunai, Chenaikudiyiruppu,Kanchikudicharu, Kurumanveli, Naavithanveli, Ezlaam kiraamam, Pathinainthaam kiraamam, Veppaiyadi, Vellaaveli, Paalaiyadiveddai, Muppathainthaam kiraamam, Muppathelaam kiraamam and Periye Kallar regions in the Batticaloa and Ampara District.

== History ==
=== Early history ===
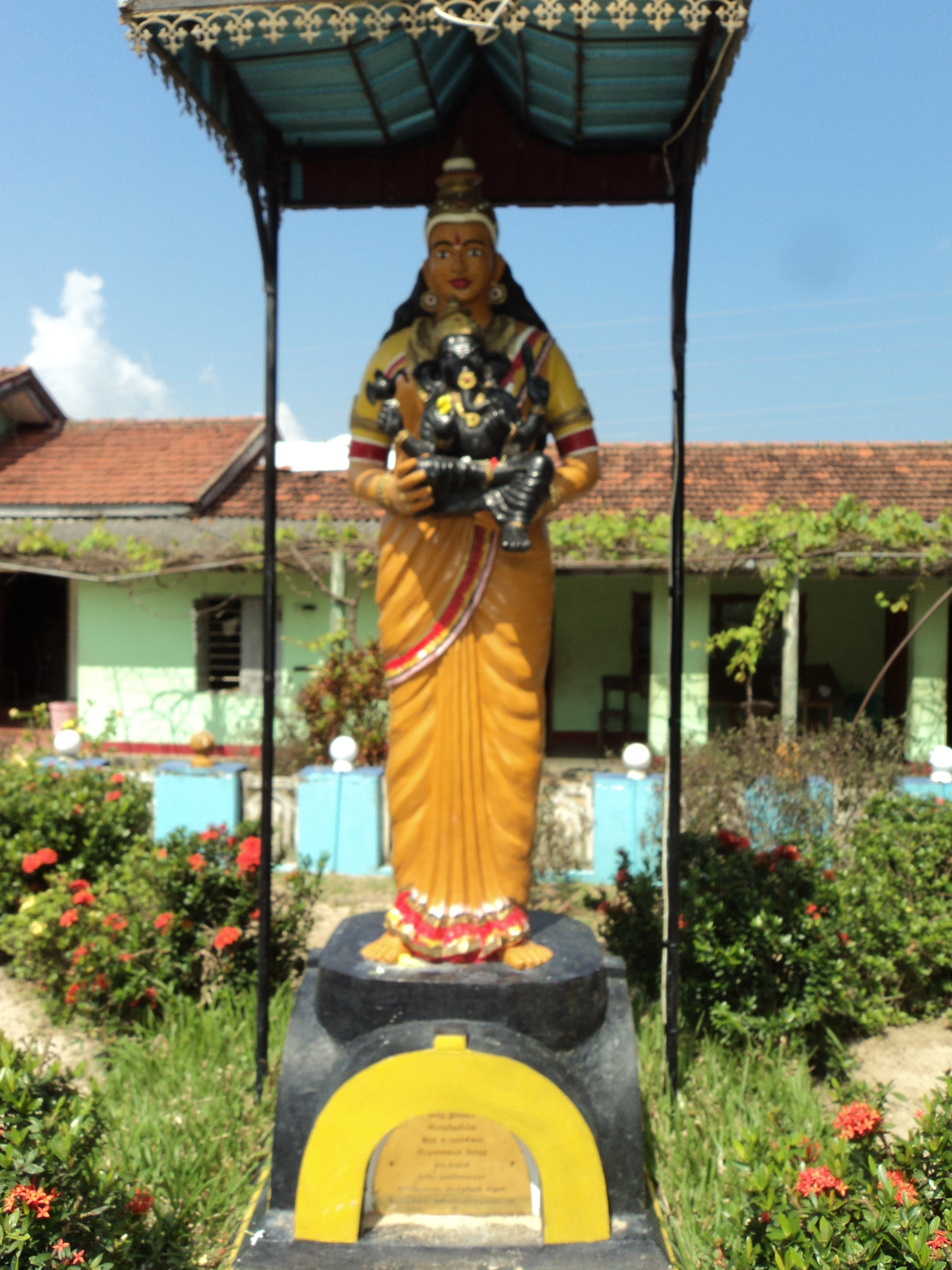
Statue of Chola queen Seerpada Devi holding a statue of Ganesha, captured in Veeramunai, Amparai.

The Seerpadar caste derive their name and origin from a Chola queen known as Seerpada Devi, chronicled in inscriptions, copper plates and local poems. According to them, their origin stems from the union of Seerpada Devi and the prince Sittathurai (also known as Balasimhan), the son of king Ukkirasinghan (legendary founder of Jaffna Kingdom). The caste has been recorded in colonial records as being involved in cultivating activities and warriors.

=== subtypes-Kudi ===
- Sinthathiran kudi
- Mudavan kudi

== Seerpadar's Inscriptions ==
- Veeramunai ceppedu
- Thirukkovil ceppedu
- Kokkaticholai ceppedu
- Thuraineelavanai ceppedu
- Thirukonamalai ceppedu

== Notable people ==
- Arul selvanayagam
- T. Kalaiarasan
- S.Thillainathan
- S.Muthukumaaran

== Others ==
- Veeramunai
- Kanchikudicharu
