= Mavil Aru =

Watercourse in Sri Lanka

- Location of Mavil Aru within Sri Lanka
- Interactive map of Mavil Aru
- Official name: Mavil Aru Anicut
- Country: Sri Lanka
- Location: Muthur and Seruwila, Trincomalee District
- Coordinates: 8.2579°N 81.2700°E
- Purpose: Irrigation and drinking water
- Status: Operational
- Construction began: c. 3rd Century CE (Original) / 1949 (Modern restoration)
- Opening date: 1949
- Built by: King Mahasena (Ancient) / Department of Irrigation (Modern)
- Owner: Government of Sri Lanka
- Operator: Department of Irrigation

Dam and spillways
- Type of dam: Concrete weir with earthen embankments
- Impounds: Mavil Aru (tributary of the Mahaweli River)
- Length: 4.8 km

Reservoir
- Creates: Mavil Aru Reservoir
- Catchment area: Feeder canal diverted from Mahaweli Ganga
- Supported Lands: ~30,000 acres of paddy Population Served: Over 15,000 families

The Mavil Aru (Mother River) is a waterway that supplies water to some regions of eastern Sri Lanka. The closing of the sluice gates is considered to be the official beginning of the Eelam War IV although violence including skirmishes and bombings happened before.

== Importance during Sri Lankan Civil War ==
On July 26, 2006, during a ceasefire period, the Liberation Tigers of Tamil Eelam (LTTE), a separatist militant organization, blocked the sluice-gates of Mavil Aru, blocking access of water to thousands of Tamil civilians in the area. This move was highly condemned by the Sri Lankan government, who pursued a military solution to resolve the conflict. In defense of their actions, The LTTE spokesperson Ilanthirayan said that the LTTE was concerned about the plight of the people of Muttur who were being subjected to "random and indiscriminate" shelling by the Sri Lankan forces even on Friday. Ilanthirayan maintained that the rebels were engaged in a "humanitarian operation" to bring to the attention of the world. He said that the Sri Lankan government, which waxed eloquent about the inhuman act of closing of the sluice gates of the Mavil Aaru anicut (dam) by the LTTE, had put an embargo on drinking water and baby food going to the Tamil people of Muttur East and Ecchchilampattu. "Ours is a defensive and humanitarian operation to highlight the grievances of the people of Muttur."

With the initiation of 'Operation Watershed', the Sri Lanka Armed Forces undertook to wipe out the LTTE. According to Gen. Sarath Fonseka, it was the correct place to start off the military battle to destroy the LTTE.The armed forces launched air strikes with the aim of capturing the waterway and sluice-gates. On August 11, 2006, the Sri Lankan Armed Forces announced that they had gained full control of the sluice gates of the reservoir.

However the attack was in fact diversion and the LTTE launched an offensive against Government held areas of Trincomalee from land and sea backed by heavy artillery as the newly leased Jetliner transport of the navy was arriving. But a combined force of naval patrolmen, army and police managed to repel the assault and launch a counter-offensive that resulting in the Battle of Sampur. The incident led to the breakdown of talks resulting in the Eastern Theatre of Eelam War IV.
