= Sampur Stupa =

Sampur Stupa & Archaeological Site
- සාම්පූර් දාගැබ හා පුරාවිද්‍යා ස්ථානය
- Interactive map of the Sampur Stupa & Archaeological Site area

General information
- Location: Mathalamalai, Soodaikudah, Sampur, Sri Lanka
- Coordinates: 08°30′22.4″N 81°17′59.8″E
- Owner: Archaeological Department (Sri Lanka)

Sampur Soodaikudah archaeological site is a historic site with archaeological evidences, situated in Mathalamalai mountain, Sampur, Sri Lanka. The site was discovered by a group of archaeologists, during an archaeological excavation done in the Sampur area in December 2017. However the ruins, including an old Stupa were completely destroyed and flattened out by a group of vandals on 18 December, few days after the discovery.

== Archaeological exploration ==
During the Sri Lankan civil war, many of the archaeological sites in the North and Eastern provinces of Sri Lanka were not properly investigated or recorded as the prevailed threats from the LTTE rebel group. After the defeat of LTTE in 2009, the archaeology department carried out several projects across the North & Eastern provinces to investigate and identify the places with archaeological evidences and the some of places were finally declared as archaeologically protected reserves and monuments. As the instructions given by Akila Viraj Kariyawasam, a similar project was started after the 2015 to investigate the unknown archaeological sites in the Eastern province of the country. In December 2017, as a part of the project a group of archaeologists unearthed a dilapidated Stupa during an excavation done in a Hindu temple premises in Soodaikudah in Sampur. According to the initial evaluations done by the archaeologists, the Stupa is a construction of early Anuradhapura period (377 BC to 1017 AD) with a girth of 15 feet.

== Hindu shrine ==
The ruins of the stupa were found on land which is used by a recently built Hindu shrine. The local people in Soodaikudah are said to be displaced in 2006 along with Muttur people and had been resettling around the area from 2013. The Hindu shrine, constructed near to the stupa mound, was officially registered in 2014.

== Destruction ==
A few days after the identification, the Stupa mound had been cleared completely by a group of people using a bulldozer before the department declared it as an archaeologically and historically important site. The destruction was first revealed by police who conducted investigations following a tip-off given on the police hotline. The incident was reported to the authorities including the Secretary to the President and the Eastern Province Governor by the chief monk of Seruvila Mangala Raja Maha Vihara. A police investigation was started following the incident and meanwhile a court order was issued by the Muttur magistrate, suspending all rehabilitation works on the Hindu temple.

On 23 December, the speaker Karu Jayasuriya revealed that the people who destroyed the Soodaikudah Stupa in Sampur has been identified. A few days after the statement, three people were arrested with a bulldozer and a lorry which were used to destroy the Stupa. The bulldozer had been brought to the Hindu shrine to dig a drinking well around 100 metres away from the Kovil but they had used the vehicle to destroy the Stupa. Local media reported that the two drivers involved in the destruction of the Stupa had met with accidents at different places on the same day.

On 29 December the Department of Archaeology announced that they will take over the entire land area, where the Sudaikuda Stupa was located for further preservation. In January police arrested three senior members of the Hindu temple board who had connected with the incident.

== See also ==
- Sagama Seya
- Mottagala Gamini Tissa Monastery
