= Operation Definite Victory =

Military operation

Operation Definite Victory නියතයි ජය මෙහෙයුම
- Part of Sri Lankan Civil War
Date	January 4, 2007 – July 11, 2007
Location	Ampara District, Sri Lanka
Result	Retreat of the LTTE from Kanchikudichcharu, fall of 20 bases to the STF

Belligerents
Sri Lanka	Liberation Tigers of Tamil Eelam

Commanders and leaders
(Sri Lanka) DIG Nimal Lewke	V. Prabhakaran

Units involved
Sri Lanka Police; Special Task Force	Liberation Tigers of Tamil Eelam

Casualties and losses
None	4 killed

Operation Definite Victory (Sinhala: නියතයි ජය මෙහෙයුම) was a military operation launched by Sri Lankan Special Task Force commandos on January 4, 2007 to liberate the Kanchikudicharu and Thoppigala regions of the Ampara District of Sri Lanka from the LTTE. The army had accused the LTTE of carrying out the child abductions in Bakmitiyawa and Ampara, including the abduction of two teachers and 23 Tamil children in December by LTTE cadres when they were returning from extra classes to their homes.

As a result of this offensive, elite police commandos were able to overrun twenty (20) rebel camps including the Stanley Base, which was the main LTTE camp in the Ampara District and a regional intelligence and supply camp, Bagayadi Base, where local and foreign foodstuffs and sanitary material was stored, Janak Base, which made clothing identical to Sri Lanka Army and Special Task Force uniforms, Jeewan Base, which was another supply camp from which the STF was able to recover four vehicles and the Diana Base where LTTE leaders meet. A statement issued by the Ministry of Defence said the camp was furnished with luxury items.

After the fall of Stanley Base, STF troops were able to find an explosive laden truck and a motor cycle that the rebels were planning to use to carry out suicide attacks in the capital of Colombo. It was reported that LTTE was housing a large number of forcibly recruited child soldiers by them in this camp. Other than that, STF troops were able to recover a large quantity of arms and ammunition, coffins, a large number of anti-personnel mines, vehicles, satellite and radio receivers, global positioning systems, power generators, boats with name and logo of the NGO "Save the Children", tents with the logo of "UNHCR" and a fully equipped hospital donated to the militants by a Dutch INGO named ZOA Refugee Care This NGO donated hospital is named by the Tigers as Thileepan Memorial Hospital. STF also said that they also found a water tanker truck donated by, the Tamil Rehabilitation Organisation (TRO) which is an affiliated organization of the LTTE.

The STF offensive in the Kanchikudichchiaru forest reserve has brought to light many illegal activities of the LTTE, which include engaging in illegal timber, ivory, torture chambers and cannabis trade. The STF had come across a large plantation of cannabis grown by the LTTE deep inside the Kanchikudichchiaru forest reserve. STF troops also detected carcasses of elephants dumped in swamps which indicate that they may have been killed for their tusks. They reported torture chambers allegedly used by Tamil Tigers to punish escaping rebels and informers, including women fighters. LTTE spokesman Rasiah Ilanthiraiyan denied the allegations. The Associated Press reported that the military had "provided no proof" of the claims, and that the SLMM monitors had not visited the area.

As a result of this mission STF troops were able to kill four rebels. The STF commented that the militants were fleeing from the area without retaliating against their troops. The government called for the surrender of fleeing LTTE cadres and offered overseas jobs after a rehabilitation programme.

== See also ==
- Eastern Theatre of Eelam War IV
- Eelam War IV
- Assassinations attributed to LTTE
- Notable attacks by the LTTE
