= Percy Fernando =

Sri Lankan army officer

Major General P. Percy Fernando † RWP, RSP, USP, CR
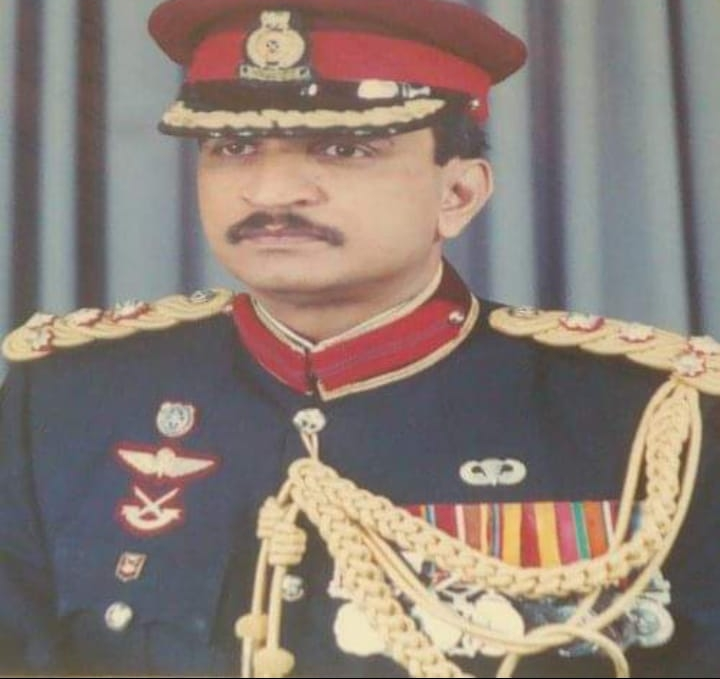
- Born: June 30, 1952; Wellawatta, Colombo, Sri Lanka
- Died: April 22, 2000 (aged 47); Elephant Pass
- Military career
- Allegiance: Sri Lanka
- Branch: Sri Lanka Army
- Rank: Major General (posthumous)
- Unit: Commando Regiment
- Commands: Deputy GOC, 54 Division, brigade commander of the Special Forces Brigade
- Conflicts: Sri Lankan Civil War, 1987–1989 JVP insurrection
- Awards: Rana Wickrama Padakkama; Rana Sura Padakkama; Uttama Seva Padakkama

Major General Percy Fernando, RWP, RSP, psc, CR (died 2000) was a Sri Lankan Army officer, who was the Deputy GOC, 54 Division based at Elephant Pass and prior to which he was the brigade commander of the independent Special Forces Brigade.

Educated at Royal College, Colombo, where he represented the school and captained the rowing team and winning several races at the Royal Thomian Regatta. Fernando joined the army after leaving school and was commissioned as a second lieutenant. Later he transferred to the Commando Regiment when it was formed in the 1980s.

Brigadier Fernando was the Sri Lanka Military Academy commandant from 1998 to 2000. He served as the Deputy GOC, 54 Division based at Elephant Pass during the Second Battle of Elephant Pass in 2000. Following orders from the GOC 54 Division to evacuate the base before taken over by LTTE, and make a withdrawal of troops from Elephant Pass, Brigadier Fernando organized and carried out an orderly withdrawal, commanding the rear guard alongside his troops. At this point during the withdrawal he was killed by a sniper. He was promoted to the rank of major general posthumously.

== Decorations ==
General Fernando has received the Rana Wickrama Padakkama (RWP), Rana Sura Padakkama (RSP), Uttama Seva Padakkama (USP), the Sri Lanka Armed Services Long Service Medal, the Riviresa Campaign Services Medal, the Purna Bhumi Padakkama and the North and East Operations Medal.

	Rana Wickrama Padakkama	Rana Sura Padakkama		
Uththama Seva Padakkama	Sri Lanka Armed Services Long Service Medal	Purna Bhumi Padakkama	North and East Operations Medal	Riviresa Campaign Services Medal

The Amateur Rowing Association of Sri Lanka and the Colombo Rowing Club honour his memory by awarding the Percy Fernando Memorial Trophy annually to the winner of the over 19 event
