= Parakrama Pannipitiya =

Sri Lankan general

- Military career
- Allegiance: Sri Lanka
- Branch: Sri Lanka Army
- Rank: Major General
- Unit: Sri Lanka Sinha Regiment
- Commands: Commander Security Forces Headquarters - East
- Conflicts: Sri Lankan Civil War, Insurrection 1987-89
- Awards: Rana Wickrama Padakkama, Rana Sura Padakkama, Uttama Seva Padakkama

Major General Parakrama Pannipitiya, RWP, RSP, USP is a former Sri Lankan army general, who was the former Commander Security Forces Headquarters - East (SF HQ (E)). Under his command the Sri Lankan army units successfully concluded the Eastern Theatre of operations in the Sri Lankan Civil War defeating the LTTE in the Eastern Province.

Shortly after the military victory in the Eastern Theatre, Major General Pannipitiya had a fallout with the then army commander Sarath Fonseka, who had him arrested on misappropriating military assets. A submission of a violation of fundamental rights petitions and the following court martial cleared him of rough doing and he was appointed as Director of Operations 11th Division.

Educated at Royal College, Colombo, he joined the army after leaving school and was commissioned into the Sri Lanka Sinha Regiment as a Second Lieutenant. He later graduated from staff college gaining the psc qualification.

He was awarded the Rana Wickrama Padakkama (RWP), Rana Sura Padakkama (RSP) for combat bravery and the service medals Uttama Seva Padakkama (USP), the Sri Lanka Armed Services Long Service Medal, the Riviresa Campaign Services Medal, the Purna Bhumi Padakkama and the North and East Operations Medal.

Military offices
Preceded by	Commander Security Forces Headquarters - East; 2007 - 2008	Succeeded by
