= Kanchikudicharu Tank =

- கஞ்சிகுடிச்சாறு பெரியகுளம் (Tamil); කන්චිකුටිචාරු වැව (Sinhala)
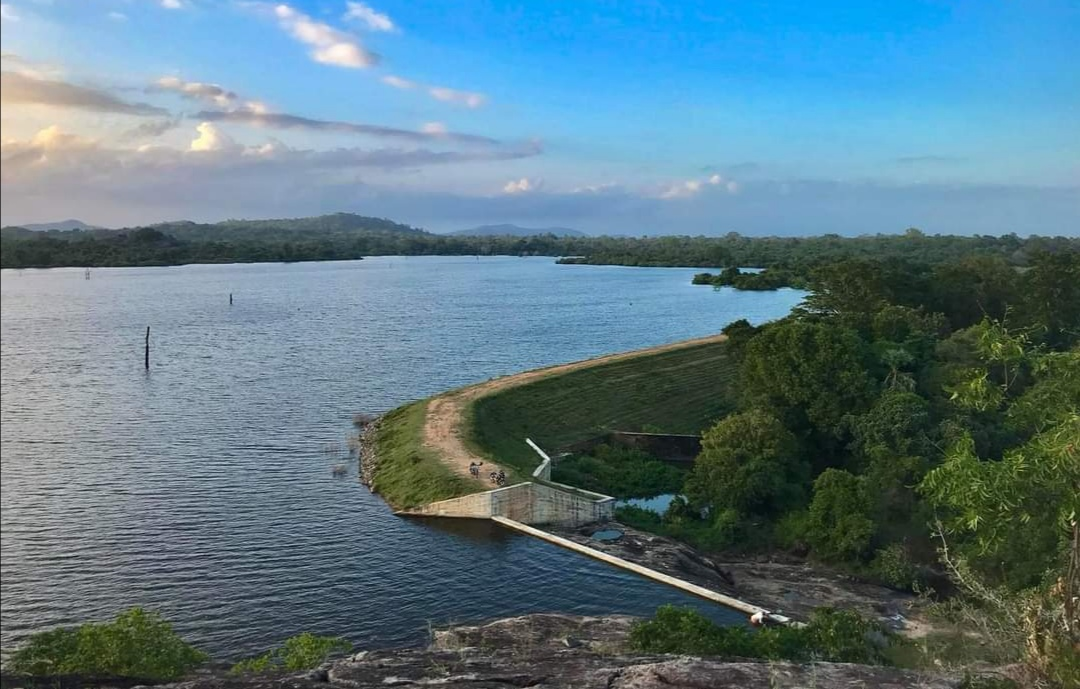

- Location within Sri Lanka
- Location: Eastern Province
- Coordinates: 7°02′40″N 81°46′30″E
- Type: Reservoir
- Catchment area: 11.5 sq mi (30 km^{2})
- Managing agency: Department of Irrigation
- Water volume: 5,100 acre⋅ft (6,290,757 m^{3})

Kanchikudicharu Tank (Tamil: கஞ்சிகுடிச்சாறு பெரியகுளம் Kanchikudicharu Kuḷam; Sinhala: කන්චිකුටිචාරු වැව) is an irrigation tank in Eastern Sri Lanka, Ampara district.

Irrigable area in acres are 1700.

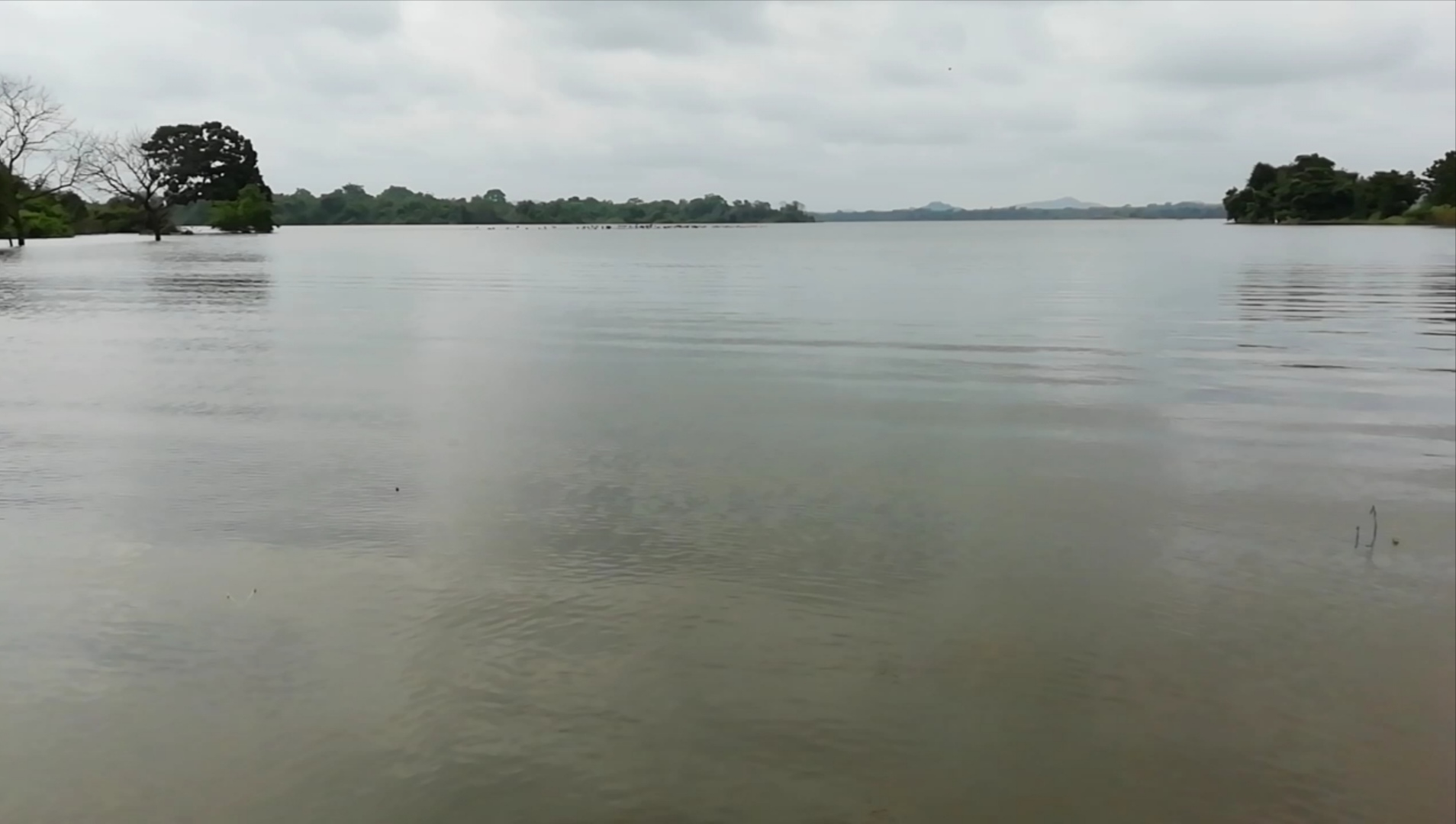
கஞ்சிகுடிச்சாறு பெரியகுளம்

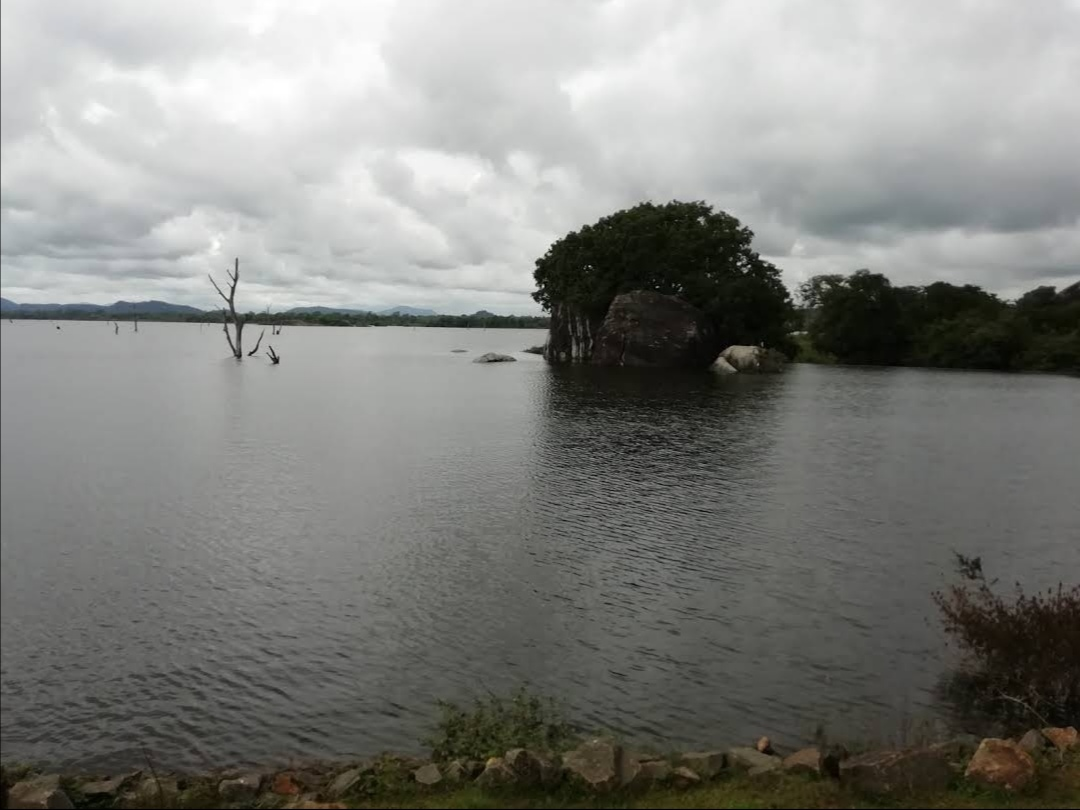
