= Battle of Sampur =

- Part of the Sri Lankan civil war
Date	28 August 2006 – 4 September 2006
Location	Sampur, Sri Lanka
Result	Sri Lankan Army victory

Belligerents
Sri Lanka	Liberation Tigers of Tamil Eelam

Commanders and leaders
Brigadier Sarath Wijesinghe	V. Prabhakaran

Units involved
Sri Lanka Armed Forces; Sri Lanka Army	Unknown

Casualties and losses
33 killed (SLA claim)	200+ killed (SLA claim); 97 Civilians killed, 215 Civilians injured and 46,000 were displaced (LTTE claim)

The Battle of Sampur was fought in 2006 for the town of Sampur during the Sri Lankan civil war.

== Background ==
Since the resumption of violence, concerns were mounting among the military establishment that the strategically crucial Sri Lanka Navy base in Trincomalee was under grave threat from LTTE gun positions located in and around Sampur, which lies across the Koddiyar Bay from Trincomalee. Artillery fired from LTTE bases in the area could potentially cripple the naval base, bringing it to a complete standstill and therefore cutting the only military supply chain to Jaffna. All movements of naval vessels were also under the constant surveillance of the LTTE. These fears were backed up by a United States military advisory team which visited the island in 2005.

== The battle ==
Following the clashes in Mavil Aru (Mavil Oya) and Muttur (Mooduthara), the LTTE had intensified attacks targeting the naval base in Trincomalee, and in a speech on 21 August, Sri Lankan president Mahinda Rajapakse made clear the government intentions were to neutralise the LTTE threat from Sampur. On 28 August, the Sri Lankan military launched an assault to retake the LTTE camps in Sampur, and the adjoining Kaddaiparichchan and Thoppur (Thuupapura) areas. This led the LTTE to declare that if the offensive continued, the ceasefire would be officially over.

After steady progress, Sri Lankan security forces led by Brigade Commander Sarath Wijesinghe re-captured Sampur (Somapura) from the LTTE on 4 September, and began to establish military bases there, as the LTTE admitted that the army had control of the area and stated their cadres withdrew from the strategically important town. It marked the first significant territorial change of hands since the signing of the ceasefire agreement in 2002. The Sri Lankan Military claimed that it lost 33 soldiers in the offensive. The Sri Lankan Military further claimed that and over 200 LTTE cadres were killed. LTTE claimed that 97 civilians were killed and over 215 civilians were further injured as a result of the military offensive. LTTE also pointed out that this offensive was a violation of the Cease Fire Agreement by the Sri Lankan Military.

== See also ==
- List of Sri Lankan Civil War battles
