= Vakarai =

American Lithuanian-language newspaper

- The January 10, 2008 front page of the Vakarai (No. 32 (114)).
- Type: International weekly
- Format: Tabloid
- Owner: News LT LLC
- Publisher: News LT LLC
- Founded: October 2005
- Language: Lithuanian
- Headquarters: 4240 Lacey Rd., Downers Grove, Illinois 60515, US
- Website: vakarai.us

The Vakarai (Lithuanian for the West) is an internationally distributed Lithuanian-American newspaper. The Vakarai is published in Chicago with its headquarters in suburban Downers Grove. It is the largest Lithuanian-American newspaper and is read not only in the United States, but in Canada and Europe as well. Currently it contains 56 pages and has four weekly supplements ("Business", "Leisure", "TranSport", and "Healthy Family").

It is owned by a private company News LT LLC since March 2007. Before it was published for two years as the Verslas.us (Lithuanian for Business.us) by another Lithuanian company, which went out of business since News LT LLC took control of the paper.

In January 2008, News LT LLC founded an online daily Vakarai.us, which serves as an independent news and entertainment source for broad Lithuanian reading audience all over the world.

According to Alexa, the web information company, as of February 2008, Vakarai.us is the most visited Lithuanian language media website in the United States of America .
