= Sri Lanka Army Commando Regiment =

Commando Regiment
- Active: 1980–present
- Country: Sri Lanka
- Branch: Sri Lanka Army
- Type: Special operations forces
- Size: 4 Regiments, 3,000 Personnel
- Part of: Commando Brigade
- Regimental Centre: Ganemulla
- Mottos: නොහැක්කක් නොමැත; Nohækkak Nomætha (Sinhala: Nothing is Impossible)
- Colors
- Anniversaries: 15 March
- Engagements: Sri Lankan Civil War
- Decorations: 5 Parama Weera Vibhushanayas

Commanders
- Centre Commandant: Brigadier BMMSK Dharmawardana RWP RSP USP
- Brigade Commander: Brigadier KVIL Jayaweera USP
- Colonel of the Regiment: Major General PGPS Rathnayake RWP RSP ndc

The Commando Regiment (Sinhala: කොමාන්ඩෝ ‍රෙජිමේන්තුව komāndo rejimēnthuwa; Tamil: இலங்கை இராணுவத்தின் கமாண்டோ படைப்பிரிவ) is a tier one special operations forces unit in the Sri Lanka Army. It was formed in 1980 and is based in Ganemulla, a suburb of Colombo.

The unit specializes in various roles including air assault and airborne operations, anti-hijacking in urban terrains, clandestine operations, counterinsurgency in jungle and urban terrains, direct action on key targets, hostage rescue, maneuver warfare, providing security in areas at risk of attack or terrorism, reconnaissance and surveillance in operations areas, special reconnaissance, support international counterterrorism, VIPs protection, and war dogs operations.

The Commando Regiment currently consists of four regular battalions organized into the Commando Brigade, under the operational command of I Corps, forming its Special Operations Forces along with the Sri Lanka Army Special Forces Regiment (SF).

== History ==
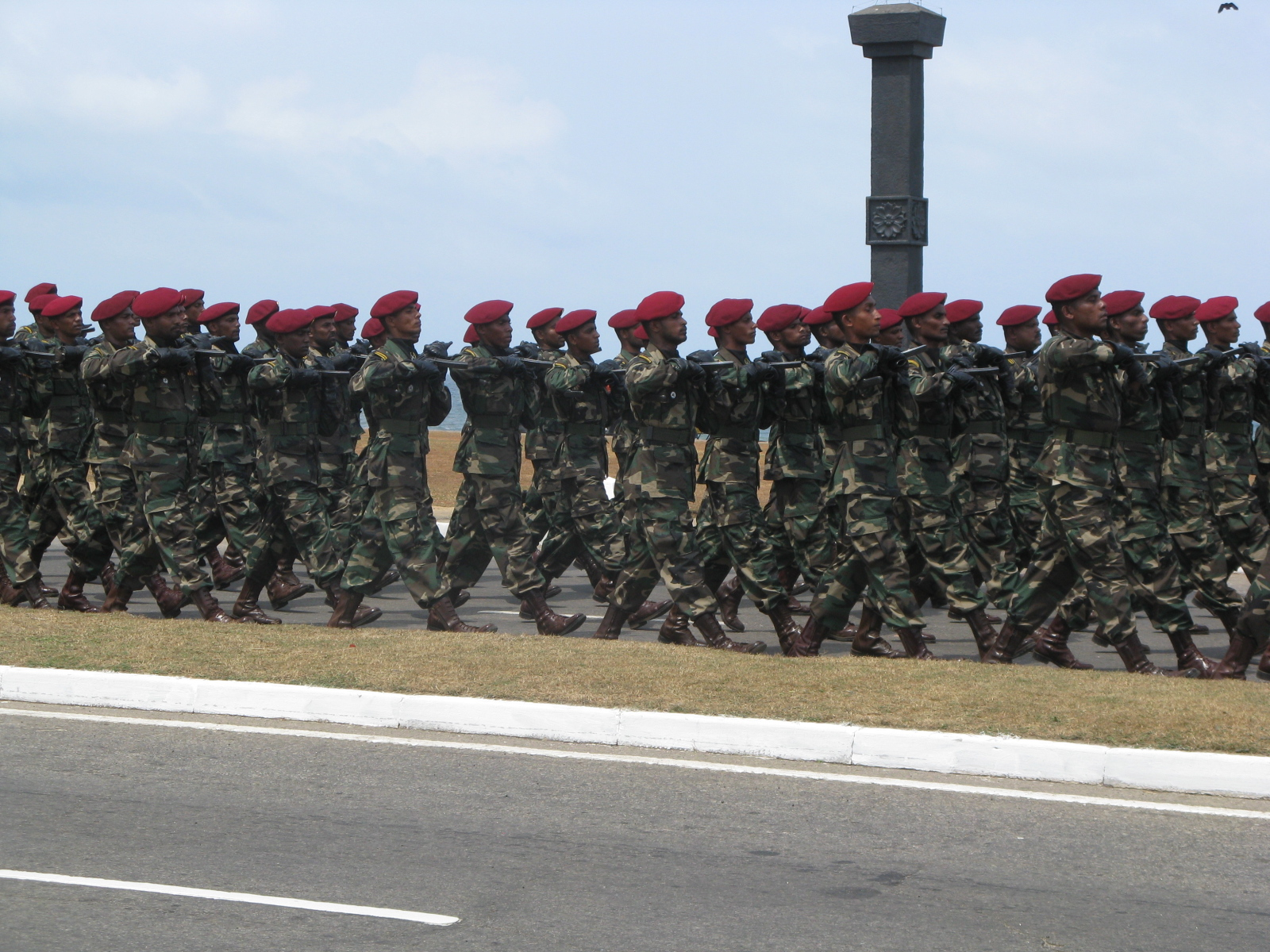
Commandos on Independence day parade

In 1977 when Lt. General Denis Perera issued a call to combating terrorism in Sri Lanka, a decision was made by the Army HQ to raise a special counterterrorism unit. Maj. Sunil Peris from 1st Gemunu Watch, Capt. Sarath Handapangoda from 1st Sinha Regiment and three other ranks were selected as a Core Group and training commenced in the Ella Camp, Army Training Centre, Diyatalawa.

On 9 February 1978 the first ever commando training course commenced, Lt U. Edirisinghe and Lt. P. Chandrawansa, and 24 Other Ranks were drawn from the Armoured Corps, Artillery, Engineers, Sri Lanka Light Infantry, Sinha Regiment and the Gemunu Watch on a volunteer basis. Lt Percy Fernando was drawn from Officer Cadet School to assist in training. Lt. Srinath Rajapaksa, Lt. Vijitha Walikala, and four officers volunteered for the second training course conducted at Diyatalawa. All trainees of both courses, except for aforementioned officers, returned to their parent units after training.

A Commando squadron was formed in Gemunu Watch 'B’ Camp at Diyatalawa and Maj S.D. Peiris, GW was appointed officer commanding, and Capt. Sarath Handapangoda was appointed as second in Command. Shortly after that, the squadron received specialised training in anti-terrorist and anti–hijack techniques conducted by the members of the Special Air Service (SAS) of the British Army. The Commandos were later trained in parachuting at Agra, India and they performed their maiden display during Army Day celebrations on 10 October 1980. 4 December 1980, the Squadron moved to its new premises in Ganemulla.

In 1981 the Commandos were employed in urban counterterrorism operations in Jaffna for the first time. It also performs special duties in the Presidential Security Division. To meet the operational requirements the Commando Regiment was expanded and a Commando Brigade was formed on 18 March 1997.4 Commando regiment was formed before the 3 Commando Regiment on 15 March 2003 which is responsible for hostage rescue, urban counterterrorism, VIPs protection, and war dogs operations tasks. Four groups which were conducting special reconnaissance since 1995 was converted into the third regiment was formed 1 August 2007 with Maj Uditha Bandara as the Commanding officer.

== Organisation ==
The Commando Regiment consists of four regular battalions. The Regimental Headquarter which includes the Regimental Centre and the Regimental Headquarter Battalion handles administration and welfare while the four regular battalions are organised into the Commando Brigade (CDO BDE) which comes under the operational command of I Corps.

=== Functions ===
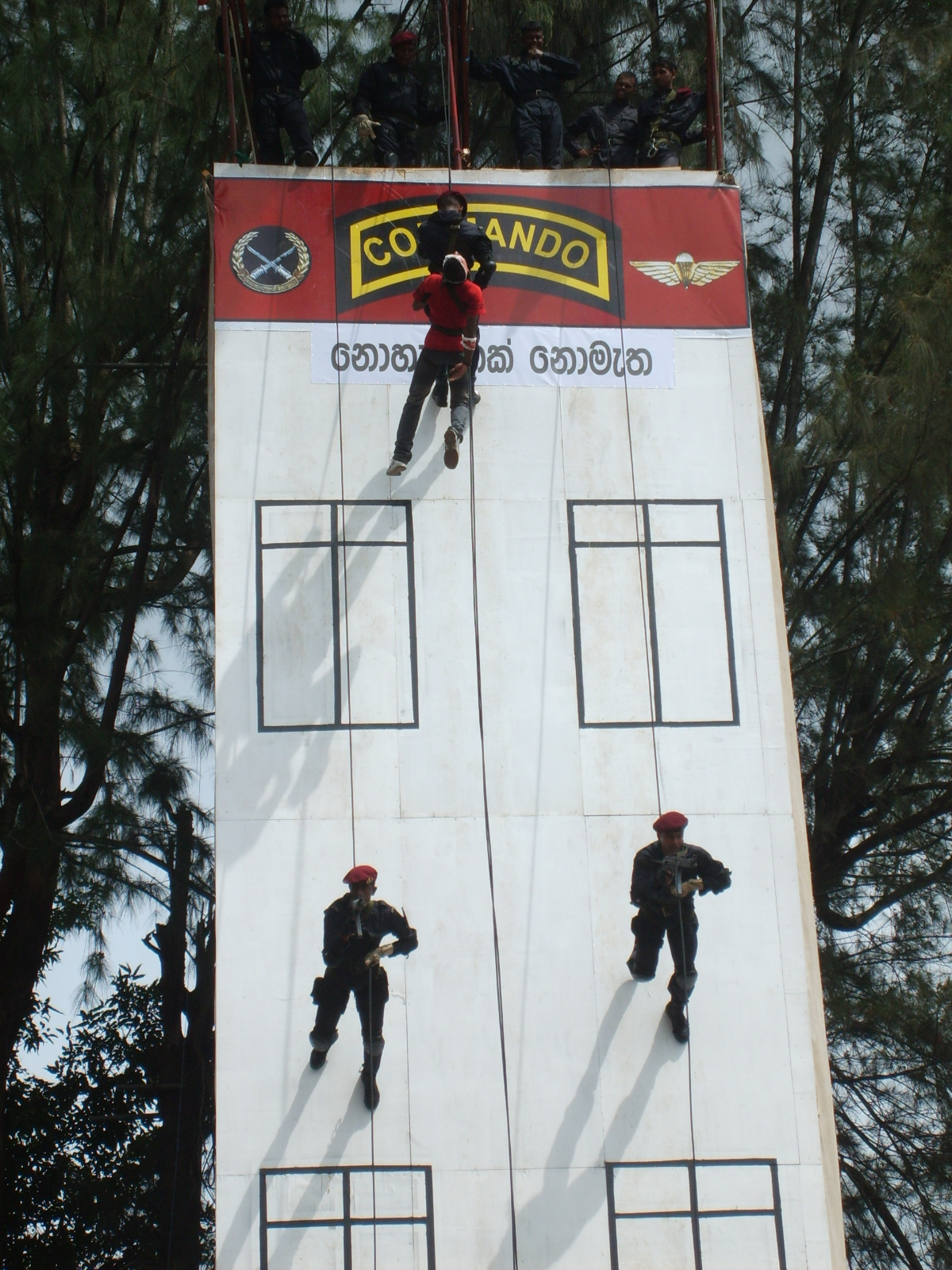
Enactment of a hostage rescue scenario by Commandos.

Current Commando Regiment roles are believed to include

- Air assault and airborne operations;
- Anti-hijacking in urban terrains;
- Clandestine operations;
- Counterinsurgency in jungle and urban terrains;
- Direct action on key targets;
- Hostage rescue;
- Maneuver warfare;
- Providing security in areas at risk of attack or terrorism;
- Reconnaissance and surveillance in operations areas;
- Support international counterterrorism;
- Special reconnaissance;
- VIPs protection;
- War dogs operations.

=== Formations ===
- Commando Brigade (CDO BDE)
  - Regimental Headquarter Battalion
  - 1st Commando Regiment
  - 2nd Commando Regiment
  - 3rd Commando Regiment
  - 4th Commando Regiment
    - Anti-hijacking and hostage rescue group
    - VIPs protection group I (Presidential Security)
    - VIPs protection group II
    - War dogs group

=== Training Schools ===
- Commando Regiment Training School, Uva Kudaoya
- Commando Regiment Specialized Warfare Training School, Vidathalathive, Mannar

== Notable Military Operations ==
In early years, most of the operations conducted by the Commando Regiment are Covert operations. A successful small group raid was done in 1990 In Mallakam in the Jaffna peninsula. By Delta Patrol of 1st Commando Regiment. Another successful raid was done in Welioya Thannimuruppu Kulam area in 1993 by a small team of Bravo Group of 2nd Commando Regiment. LTTE's Colonel Amudan alias Thambi (tag no 0003) was also killed in 1994 creating a great impact on the chain of command of the LTTE.

Commando Regiment deployed its units in Colombo on following LTTE attacks

- 1997 Colombo WTC Bombing & Lakehouse Hostage Crisis
- Rajagiriya Ayurveda junction bombing and hostages situation in Serpentine flats.
- Bandaranaike Airport attack

With the commencement of the 4th phase of the Sri Lankan civil war (often cited as 4th Eelam war), the Commandos and Special Forces were tasked to conduct deep operations to disrupt and deny the freedom of action of Liberation Tigers of Tamil Eelam (LTTE). Commandos were able to disorientate the LTTE Leadership by conducting ambushes and raids by inflicting attrition on LTTE, thus forcing them to deploy more troops for their rear area security. Their operations shaped up the battlefield creating a favorable situation to launch a historical major offensive to liberate Eastern Province from LTTE.

=== Long Range Reconnaissance Patrol Missions ===
The Long Range Reconnaissance Patrol (LRRP) is the only black operations unit of the Sri Lanka Army. This unit is operated under the Directorate of Military Intelligence of the Army and it is composed of personnel from the Commando Regiment and Special Forces Regiment.

=== Operation Thoppigala ===
The 3rd Commando Regiment participated in the military offensive which was launched to capture the Thoppigala (Baron's Cap) from Liberation Tigers of Tamil Eelam (LTTE) during the period of June/July 2007. They managed to seize the rocky plateau which had been named by the LTTE as Tora Bora. Around 200 LTTE cadres were killed during the entire offensive.

=== Capture of the Unnichchai tank bund ===
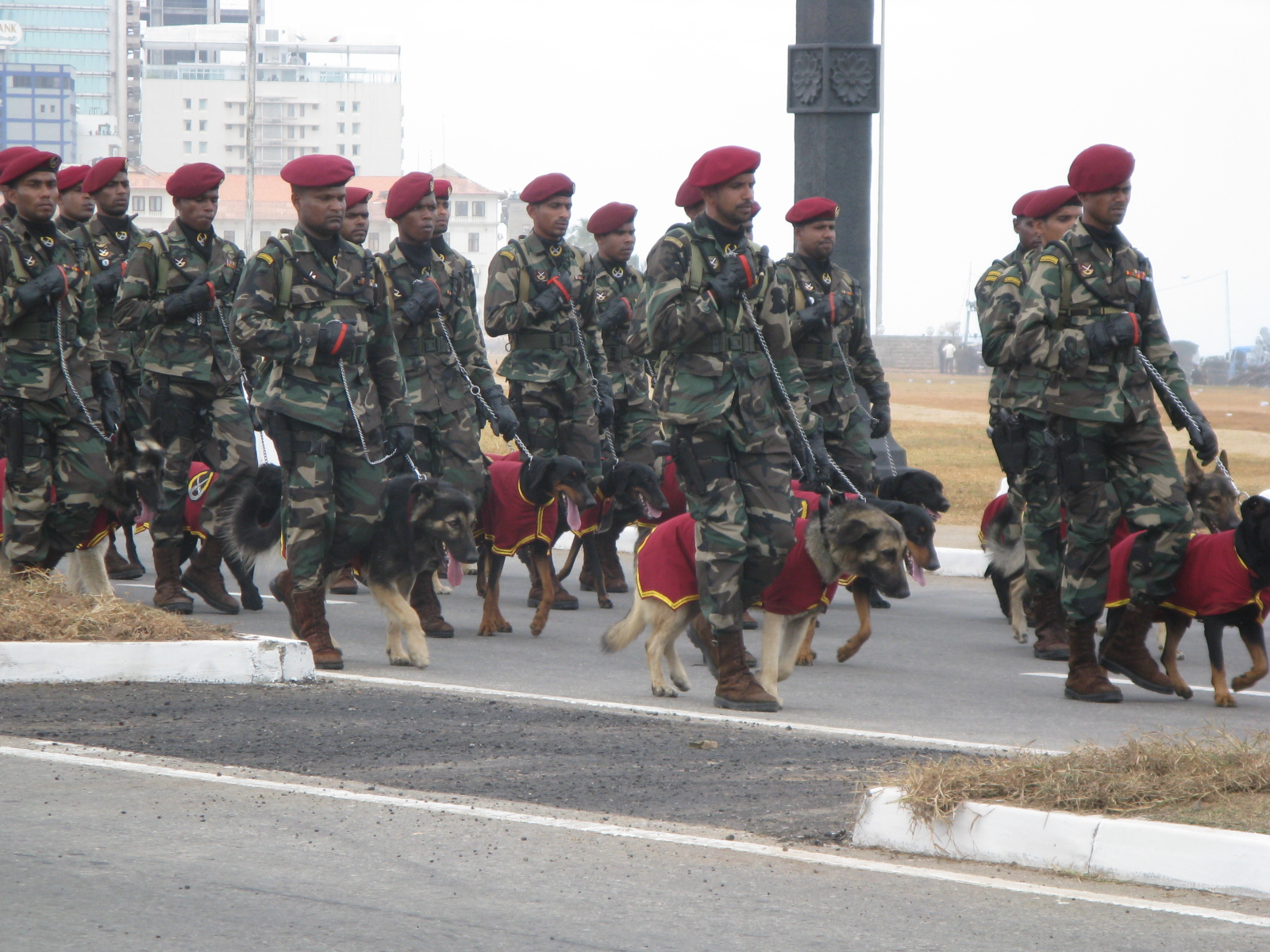
Sri Lanka Army Commando K9 Unit

After a successful operation to capture Vakarai and Sampur by the Special Forces Brigade, the Commandos were tasked to capture the LTTE strongholds around Thoppigala and Narakamulla. Gaining control of the A–5 road which runs from Maha Oya to Batticaloa via Chenkaladi was essential to gaining access to the jungles of Thoppigala. From Pullumale to Black Bridge at Chenkalladi road was totally controlled by the LTTE. Further, the LTTE was operating freely in the jungles between the A−27 and A−5 roads. Hence, it was essential to gain control of this portion of the road and in the jungles, to launch an operation to destroy the bastion of Thoppigala. However, the A-27 road which runs from Maha Oya to Potuvil and the road from Trikonamadu to Kalmunai were controlled by the Army but was vulnerable to the LTTE attacks.

After finalizing plans for a major operation, the mobilization of assigned troops commenced in preparation for launching a decisive attack against LTTE strongholds in the theatre. However, intelligence revealed that the LTTE planned to destroy the Unnichchai tank bund if the Security Forces launched an operation to gain control over the area. They intended to inundate the area by destroying the tank bund to destabilize the government and ultimately spoil the security forces' plan. In this backdrop, commandos were tasked to capture the Unichchai Tank bund intact to facilitate the major offensive. The capture of Unnichchai tank bund was one of the most significant raids conducted by commandos to facilitate break out of the major offensive to capture the LTTE stronghold Thoppigala.

=== Reconnaissance missions ===
- Periyamadu rescue (22 November 2001): An eight-man Special Mission Patrol (Long Range Reconnaissance Patrol) (LRRP) led by Lieutenant Udesha Ratnayake was surrounded by the Liberation Tigers of Tamil Eelam (LTTE) at Periyamadu, near Tunukkai in Vanni region at least 25 km inside the enemy lines after an anti-personnel mine blast which injured two of them. This special patrol was planned ambush Poonarin - Paranthan road to take high-value terrorist targets at the Poonarin area. Unfortunately, this incident happened at 1945hrs on 21st and the team managed to survive till 1250 hrs on 22 November with one serious casualty. The trapped team was rescued by the Helicopter Squadron(01-Bell 212,2-MI24,1-MI17 Helicopters) of SLAF(Mission Pilot-Fl.Lt. Sudam Kaluaarachchi. It had taken exactly one-hour airborne time which included 28 minutes in LTTE held area and 50 seconds landing, rescue, and take-off time. Four helicopters had flown in at an altitude of 195 feet(treetop level).

The whole operation was led by Major. Upali Rajapaksha RWP RSP (2IC-2 CR)of Commando Regiment who launched the operation and inducted to the location by the leading helicopter from Hingurakgoda Air Force base. This mission was conducted under extremely bad weather conditions and this was the first-ever rescue mission of this nature conducted by elite forces of Sri Lanka Army.

== Parama Weera Vibhushanaya recipients ==
- Major G. S. Jayanath
- Corporal H. A. Nilantha Kumara
- Sergeant K. G. D. Gunasekara
- Staff Sergeant K. G. N. Perera
- Corporal S. P. M. L. Pushpama

== Notable members ==
- Major General Janaka Perera – former Chief of Staff of the Sri Lanka Army, a Leader of Operation Riviresa, former Sri Lankan High Commissioner to Australia & Ambassador to Indonesia
- Major General Percy Fernando – former Deputy General officer commanding of 54th Division,killed in action April 2000
- Major General Samantha Sooriyabandara – former Commander of 53 Division
- Lieutenant Colonel Sunil Peris - First Officer Commanding of the Commando regiment
- Snowy (Military dog) – tracking dog; first animal to be awarded a military award in Sri Lanka
- Teesha (Military dog) – tracking dog; first dog to successfully complete a high-altitude parachute jump in Sri Lanka
- Lahiru Kavinda Hathurusinghe - soldier who fought for Ukraine under International Legion, killed in April 2026 in Sumy, Ukraine.

== Order of precedence ==
Preceded by Mechanized Infantry Regiment	Order of Precedence	Succeeded by Special Forces Regiment

== See also ==
- Military of Sri Lanka
- Sri Lanka Air Force Regiment Special Force
