= Vakarai (Sri Lanka) =

Vakarai வாகரை වාකරේ
- Town
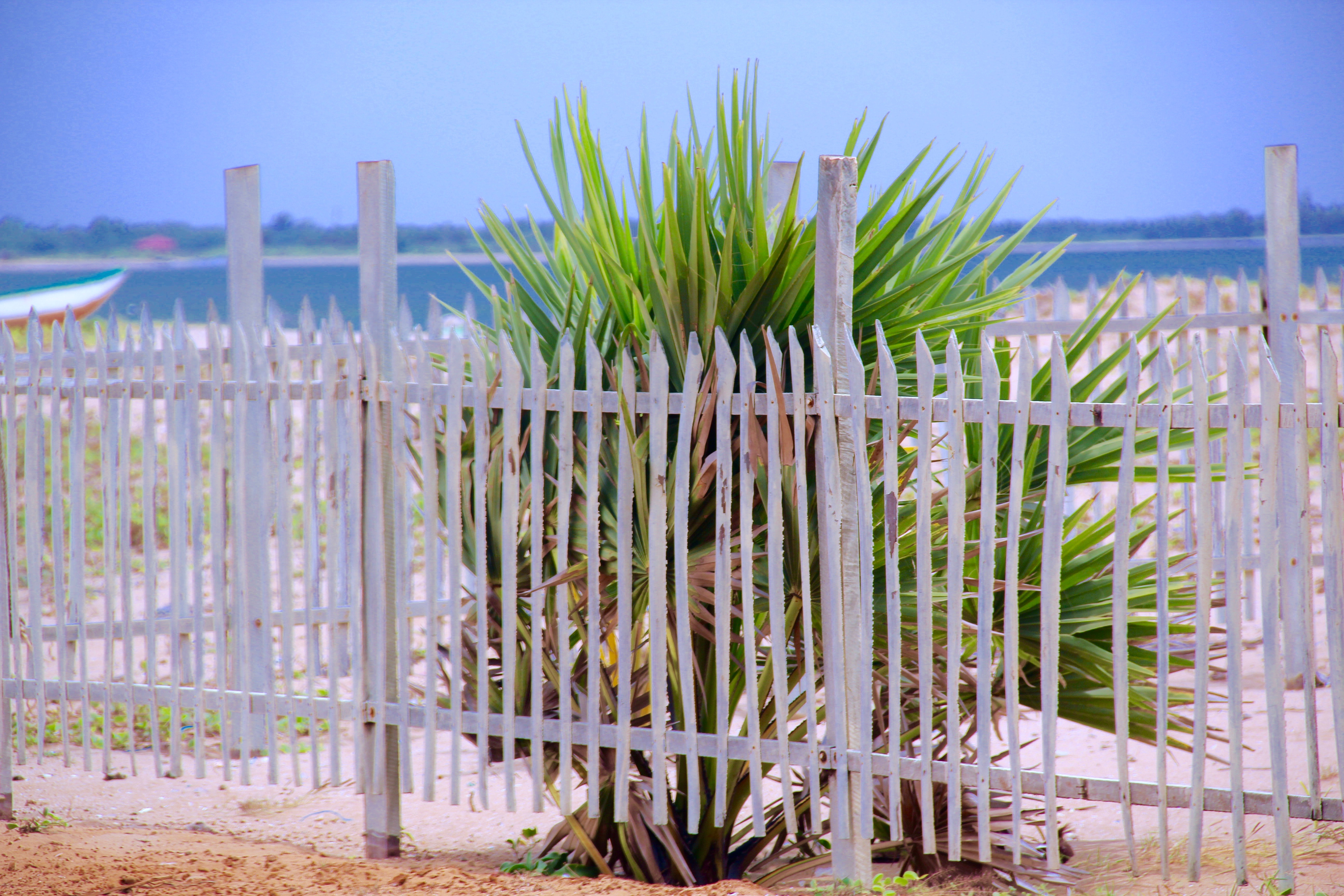
- Sallitivu Beach

- Location within Sri Lanka
- Coordinates: 8°08′0″N 81°26′0″E
- Country: Sri Lanka
- Province: Eastern
- District: Batticaloa
- DS Division: Koralai Pattu North

Vakarai or Vaharai (Sinhala: වාකරේ, Tamil: வாகரை), The Sinhala name වාකර is pronounced 'vākara'. It is a town in the Batticaloa District of Sri Lanka, located about 65 km northwest of Batticaloa. The Anglicization vākari should be preferred to vāhari.

This a predominantly Tamil area, and headquarters the Koralai Pathu North Division has a population around 21,000. The residents are predominantly poor fishermen or farmers.

== Civil War ==
Vakarai was the LTTE stronghold in the Eastern province and served as a strategically important city for the communication between the Eastern Province and the Northern Province. Since 1985 it has served as a major battleground with its control often shifting between the Sri Lankan government, the Indian Peace Keeping Forces and the LTTE. The Karuna faction broke from the LTTE here and the LTTE was pushed out in 2007.

== See also ==
- Vakarai Bombing
