= Kudumbimalai =

Kudumbimalai குடும்பிமலை කුඩුම්බිමල
- Town
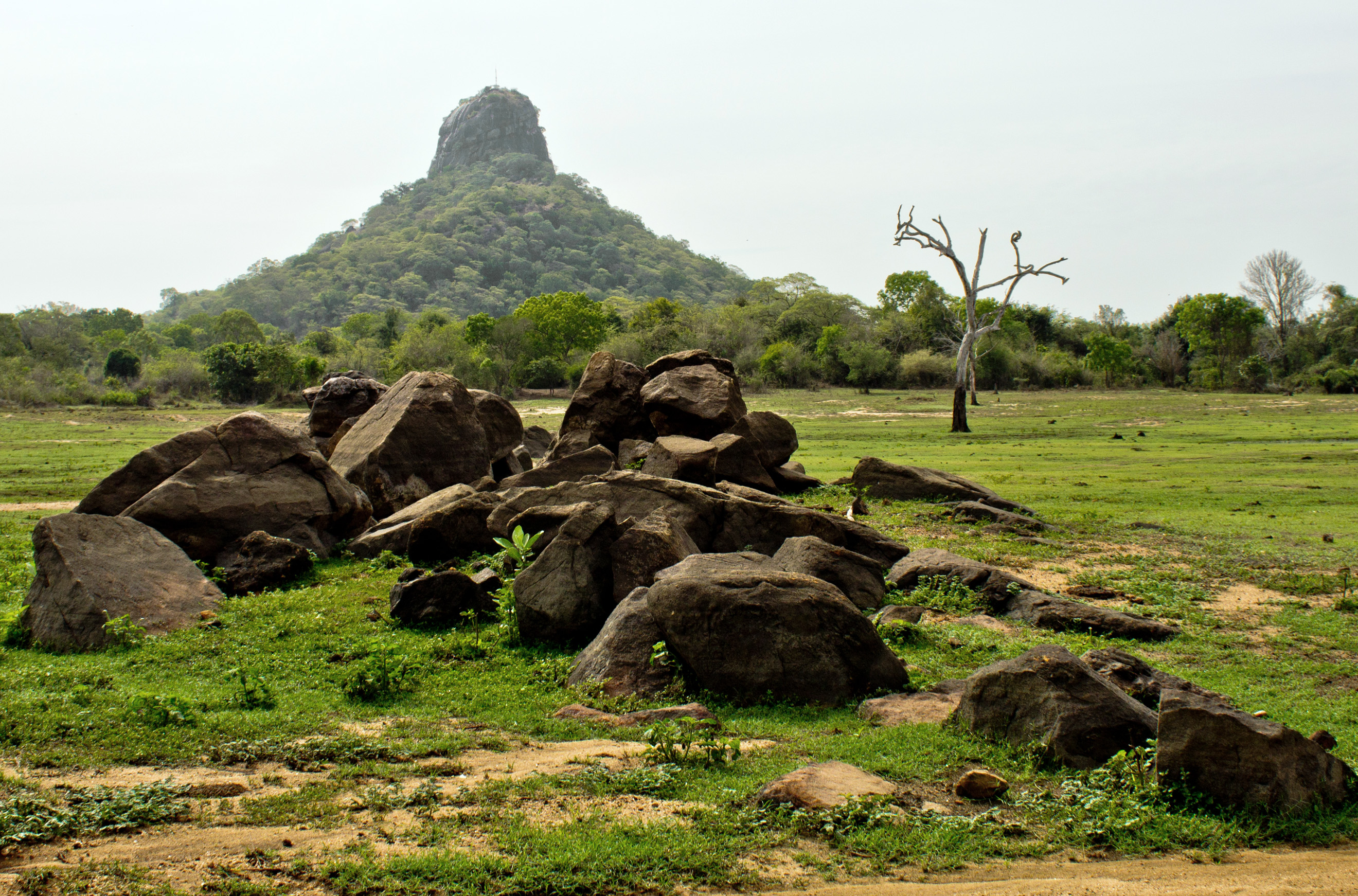
- Kudumbimalai

- Location within Sri Lanka
- Coordinates: 7°52′0″N 81°32′0″E
- Country: Sri Lanka
- Province: Eastern
- District: Batticaloa
- DS Division: Koralai Pattu South

Kudumbimalai known in sinhala as Kudumbimala (Tamil: குடும்பிமலை; Sinhala: කුඩුම්බිමල, Kudumbimalai Hill) is a region in the west of Batticaloa District, Sri Lanka. It consists of a rock formation and a thick jungle. The area is very close to Polonnaruwa District border.

Kudumbimalai in Tamil translates to Hair-knot-rock. British colonists from the past named the rock Baron's Cap.

Kudumbimalai was under the control of the Liberation Tigers of Tamil Eelam and was strategically important to the organization. In 2007, the Sri Lankan army captured the town from the LTTE in the Battle of Thoppigala, and permanently evicted the LTTE from the Eastern Province.
