= Sampur, Trincomalee =

Sampur சம்பூர்
- Town
- Location within Sri Lanka
- Coordinates: 8°29′0″N 81°17′0″E
- Country: Sri Lanka
- Province: Eastern
- District: Trincomalee
- DS Division: Mutthur

Sampur (Tamil: சம்பூர், romanized: Campūr) is a town in the Trincomalee District of Sri Lanka about 30 km south-east of Trincomalee on the south-eastern side of the Trincomalee Harbour. The town was under the control of the Liberation Tigers of Tamil Eelam until 2006, when it was captured by the Sri Lanka Armed Forces.

== History ==
The Sampur Coal Power Station has been planned for Sampur since the early-1990s, but the project has stalled due to political wrangling and environmental concerns.

== See also ==
- Battle of Sampur
- Sampur Stupa
