= Ganemulla =

Ganemulla ගණේමුල්ල கணேமுல்லை
- Town
- Location in Sri Lanka
- Coordinates: 7.0667°N 79.95°E
- Country: Sri Lanka
- Province: Western Province
- District: Gampaha District
- Time zone: +5.30
- Postal code: 11020
- Area code: 033
- Website: https://www.ganemulla.com

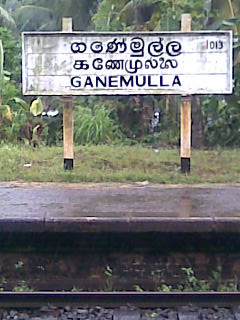
Ganemulla railway station name board indicating (013) the Station is 13 miles from Maradana.

Founded during the British era, Ganemulla (Sinhala: ගණේමුල්ල, Tamil: கணேமுல்லை) is a midsize town located in the Gampaha District of Sri Lanka. Ganemulla is about 9 km (5.6 mi) from Kadawatha on the Colombo-Kandy road. The nearest city to Ganemulla is Gampaha, which is about 5 kilometres (3.1 mi) away. Ganemulla is surrounded by the towns of Kadawatha, Gampaha, Ja-Ela and Kandana. The population in Ganemulla now exceeds 6,000 and is increasing. The majority of the population are Sinhalese Buddhist, with a small Catholic minority.

The Sri Lanka Army Commando Regiment is based in Ganemulla.

== Archaeology ==
An archaeologically important drainage line was discovered nearby Ganemulla railway station recently, believed to be used in the 18th century when some of the coastal areas of Sri Lanka was under the control of Dutch rulers. However, this has not undergone a proper excavation and is currently in poor condition due to lack of restoration.

== Transport ==
Ganemulla is the 13th railway station from Colombo Fort on the Colombo-Polgahawele main railway line. The main bus route between Ganemulla and Kadawatha carries the number 223. Further bus routes are 218 between Kadawatha and Ganemulla, 214 between Gampaha and Ganemulla, 738 between Kossinna and Colombo Fort, and 266 and 278 both connecting Ganemulla and Ja-Ela. Routes 276 Gampaha-Kandana and 979 Gampaha-Ragama also serve Ganemulla town.

== Notable Events ==
In the latter part of 1950s, probably in 1959, it was at Ganemulla where Ceylon Government Railways, as it was known then, had to abolish the Class System that was operating in morning and evening commuter trains. It was after a serious incident, when one morning, office bound commuters from a train decided to demonstrate their grievances against the authority for penalising the use of 2nd class carriages by several 3rd class ticket holders in an overcrowded train. Following an argument and scuffle with ticket checkers, all the passengers disembarked from the train at Ganemulla railway station, and prevented the train from proceeding its journey to Colombo. Having heard of the commotion, a Buddhist monk from a nearby temple, Venerable Daevamottawe Amarawansa Thero, came down to the station and supported the demonstrators in solidarity. Led by the monk, demonstrating commuters then blocked both railway lines preventing the passage of all trains transiting through Ganemulla railway station. By mid-day, all negotiations to clear the lines had failed, and so the authorities had to yield to the public demand, declaring that the Class System in all morning and evening commuter trains would be abolished forthwith, a ruling that has continued to this day. Almost 40-years later in 1992, in memory of this historic event, and to honour his contribution, a large statue of the late monk was erected on a platform at Ganemulla station, adjacent to the overhead steel bridge.

== Schools ==
Ganemulla is the main town for two reputed Government Secondary Schools: Hemamali Maha Vidyalaya, Ganemulla, and Galahitiayawa Central College. The latter is one of the original Central Colleges set up by Mr C W W Kannangara, Minister of Education in the late 1940s; more recently it was upgraded to a National School status.
