= Eelam War IV =

Conflict between Sri lanka and LTTE separatists

- Part of the Sri Lankan Civil War
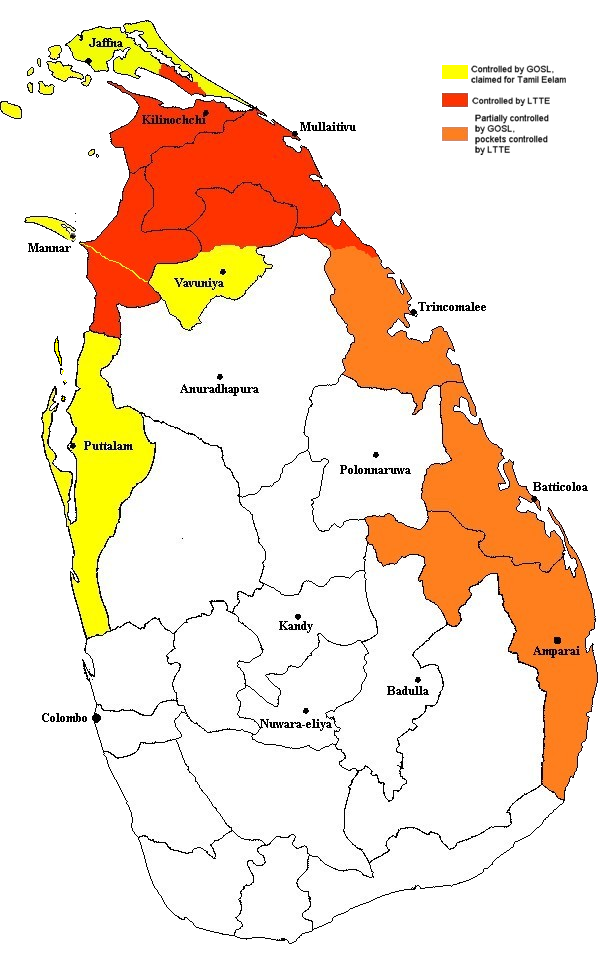
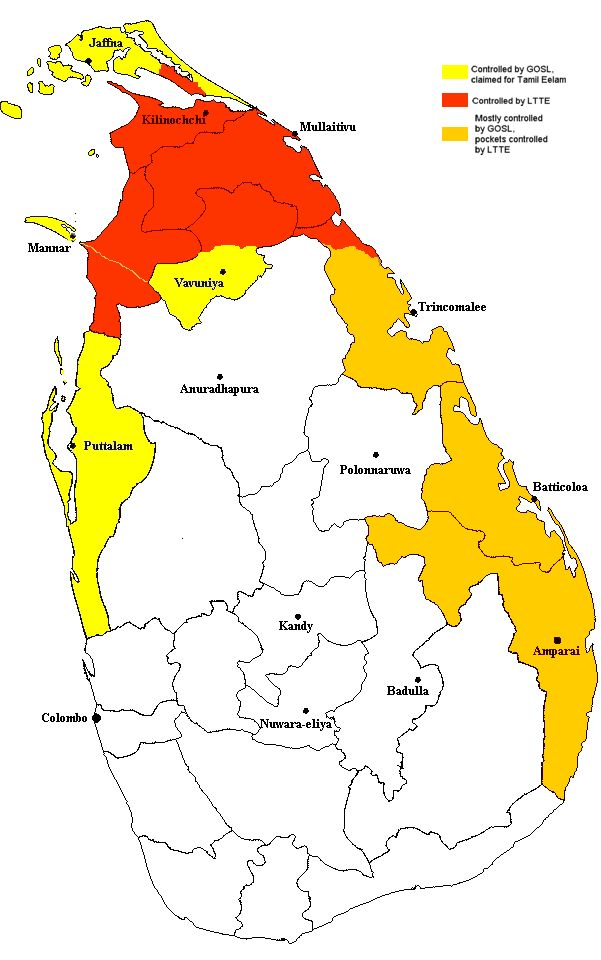
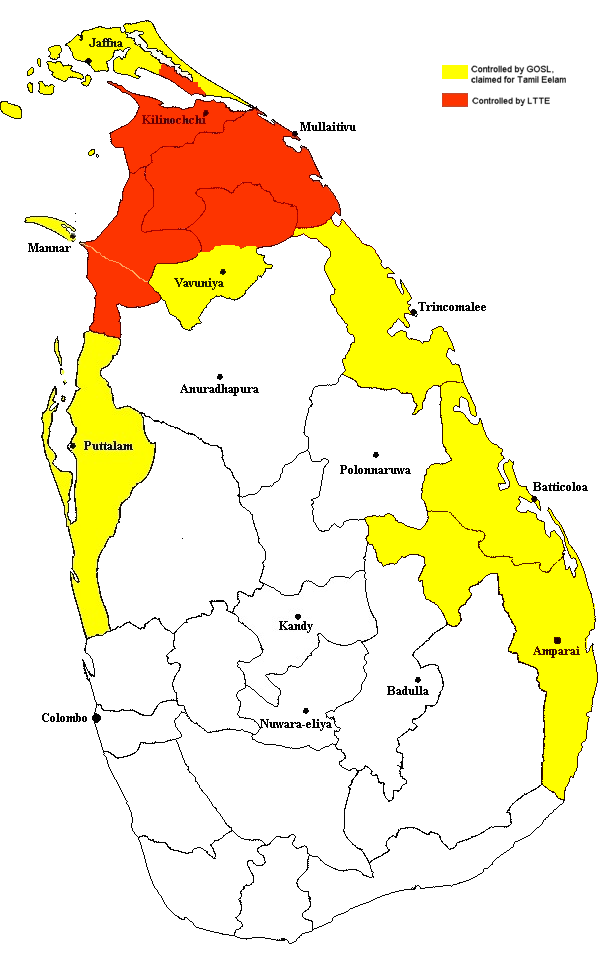
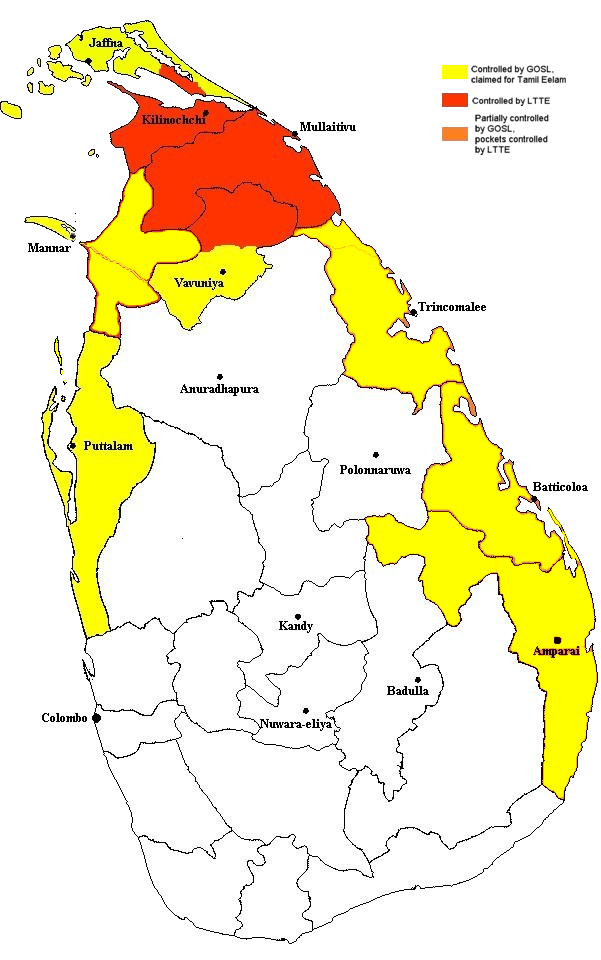
- The area of Sri Lanka claimed by the LTTE as Tamil Eelam, where the vast majority of the fighting took place
Date	26 July 2006 – 18 May 2009 (2 years, 9 months, 3 weeks and 1 day)
Location	Sri Lanka
Result	Decisive Sri Lankan Armed Forces victory End of Tamil Tiger (LTTE) conventional military capabilities End of Tamil Tiger (LTTE) Guerrilla warfare capabilities Destruction of LTTE military infrastructure and top leadership

Belligerents
Sri Lanka; Supported by Pakistan	Liberation Tigers of Tamil Eelam

Commanders and leaders
(Sri Lanka) Mahinda Rajapaksa; Sarath Fonseka; Wasantha Karannagoda; Roshan Goonatilake	Velupillai Prabhakaran †

Units involved
Sri Lanka Armed Forces; Sri Lanka Army; Sri Lanka Navy; Sri Lanka Air Force; Pakistan Armed Forces; Pakistan Air Force	Liberation Tigers of Tamil Eelam; Sea Tigers; Air Tigers; Black Tigers

Strength
200,000 (approx.)	30,000 (approx.)

Casualties and losses
6,261 killed (government claim); 29,551 wounded (government claim)	22,000 killed 8,000 captured (government claim)

Eelam War IV was the fourth and final phase of armed conflict between the Sri Lankan military and the separatist Liberation Tigers of Tamil Eelam (LTTE). Renewed hostilities began on the 26 July 2006, when Sri Lanka Air Force fighter jets bombed several LTTE camps around Mavil Aru anicut, with the casus belli being that the LTTE had cut off the water supply to surrounding paddy fields in the area. This bombing shut down the sluice gates of the Mavil Aru, depriving water to over 15,000 people, mainly Sinhalese and Muslim settlers under Sri Lankan state-sponsored colonisation schemes in Trincomalee District. As a result, the settlers were denied of water for drinking and also cultivating over 30,000 acres of paddy and other crops. The fighting resumed after a four-year ceasefire between the Government of Sri Lanka (GoSL) and LTTE. Continued fighting led to several territorial gains for the Sri Lankan Army, including the capture of Sampur, Vakarai and other parts of the east. The war took on an added dimension when the LTTE Air Tigers bombed Katunayake airbase on March 26, 2007, the first terrorist air attack without external assistance in history.

Eelam War IV ended on 18 May 2009 with the Sri Lanka Army gaining control of the last bit of territory held by the LTTE and with the death of the LTTE leader Velupillai Prabhakaran. The final few days of the war near Nandikadal Lagoon in the north east of the island saw very heavy fighting and led to Sri Lankan forces being accused of war crimes, which were denied by the government. Some 300,000 Tamil civilians who were trapped inside the war zone and prevented from escaping by the LTTE were caught in the crossfire during the final phase of the war.

== Peace process 2002 ==
The elections held on 5 December 2001 saw a sweeping victory for the United National Front, led by Ranil Wickremasinghe, who campaigned on a pro-peace platform and pledged to find a negotiated settlement to the conflict.

On 19 December, amidst efforts by Norway to bring the government and the Tamil Tigers to the negotiating table, the LTTE announced a 30-day ceasefire with the Sri Lankan government and pledged to halt all attacks against government forces. The new government welcomed the move, and reciprocated it 2 days later, announcing a month-long ceasefire and agreeing to lift a long-standing economic embargo on rebel-held territory.

=== Signing of MoU ===
The two sides formalized a Memorandum of Understanding (MoU) on February 22, 2002 and signed a permanent ceasefire agreement (CFA). Norway was named mediator, and it was decided that they, together with the other Nordic countries, monitor the ceasefire through a committee of experts named the Sri Lanka Monitoring Mission. In August, the government agreed to lift the ban on the LTTE and paved the way for the resumption of direct negotiations with the LTTE.

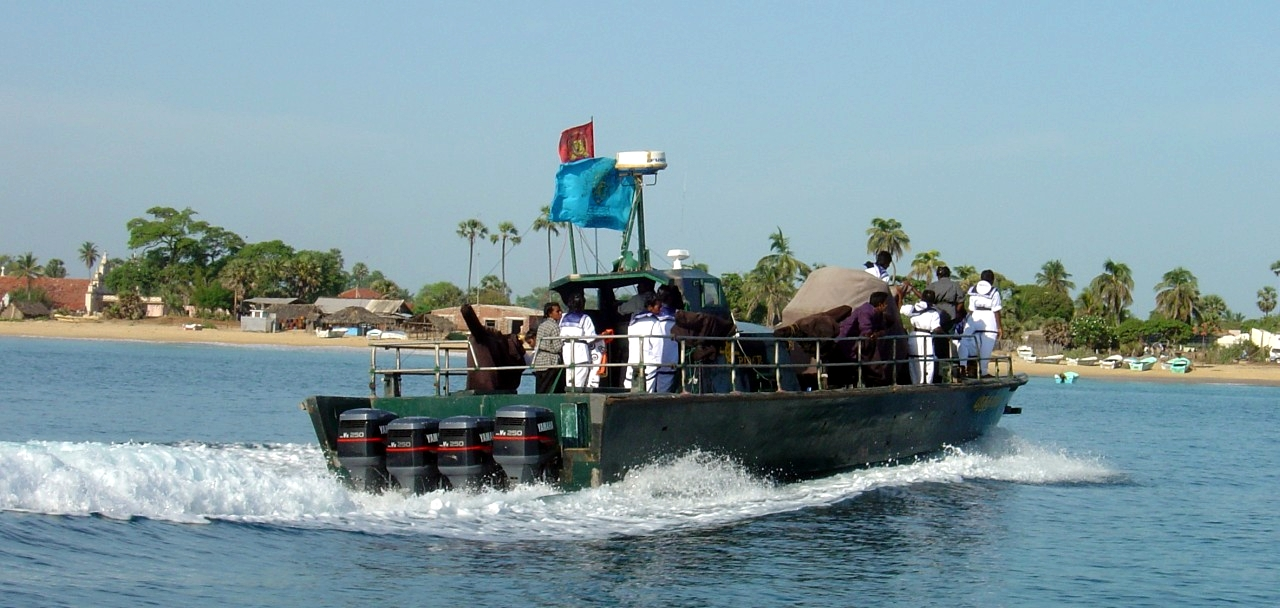
LTTE Sea Tiger boat patrolling during the peace.

Following the signing of the ceasefire agreement, commercial air flights to Jaffna began and the LTTE opened the key A9 highway, which linked government controlled area in the south with Jaffna and ran through LTTE territory, allowing civilian traffic through the Vanni region for the first time in many years. Many foreign countries also offered substantial financial support if peace was achieved and optimism grew that an end to the decades long conflict was in sight.

The much anticipated peace talks began in Sattahip Naval Base, Chonburi Province, Thailand on the September 16, with 5 further rounds following in Rose Garden, Nakhorn Pathom Province, Norway and Berlin, Germany. During the talks, both sides agreed to the principle of a federal solution and the Tigers dropped their long standing demand for separate state. This was a key compromise from the LTTE, which had always insisted on an independent Tamil state and it also represented a compromise from the government, which had seldom agreed to more than minimal devolution. Both sides also exchanged prisoners of war for first time.

== Beginning of the war ==
A new crisis leading to the first large-scale fighting since signing of the ceasefire occurred in 2006, when the LTTE closed the sluice gates of the Mavil Aru reservoir on July 21 and cut the water supply to 15,000 villages in government controlled areas. After initial negotiations and efforts by the SLMM to open the gates failed, the Air Force attacked LTTE positions on July 26, and ground troops began an operation to open the gate. Palitha Kohona, a government spokesman, stated that the government remained committed to the cease-fire. Likewise, the LTTE also claimed that they were committed to the ceasefire

The sluice gates were eventually reopened on August 8, by Sri Lankan Military who managed to forcibly take control of the sluice gates of the reservoir from LTTE rebels. However a government spokesman said that "utilities could not be used as bargaining tools" by the rebels and government forces launched fresh attacks on LTTE positions around the reservoir. Eventually, following heavy fighting with the rebels, government troops gained full control of the Mavil Aru reservoir on August 15.

== War in the East ==
The war between LTTE and Sri Lankan government started after the failure of Norway brokered cease fire on 21 July 2006, when LTTE cut off the water supply to the rice growing fields in the Mavil Aru area in eastern Trincomalee district. The government military claimed the total control of the eastern province after capturing Thoppigala on 11 July 2007 following nearly a year of fighting.

The TMVP contested Batticaloa district local council election on 10 March 2008 and won all 9 councils with a high majority 70% of votes. The party also contested in Eastern Provincial Council election May 10, 2008 under the ruling UPFA banner and UPFA won the election. TMVP's leader Sivanesathurai Chandrakanthan was sworn in as the Chief Minister of Eastern Provincial Council on 16 May 2008.

== Political situation in North and East ==
Karuna has also been accused of gross human rights violations such as forming death squads, harassing journalists, extrajudicial killings, abductions, and the use of child soldiers against the LTTE. Apart from that his group has split due to alleged financial corruption issues. Karuna, with the help of the Government of Sri Lanka, was smuggled into Great Britain for refuge. He was later arrested by British authorities for illegal entry and is being probed for war crimes.

== Sri Lanka pulls out of ceasefire ==
On 2 January 2008, The Sri Lankan government unanimously decided to formally withdraw from the ceasefire with the separatist Tamil Tiger rebels, which had existed only on paper over the past two years. Prime Minister Ratnasiri Wickramanayake had proposed that the cabinet annul the truce after yet another bomb blast went off on 2 January in the capital, Colombo, killing five and injuring over 28.

"The Government of Sri Lanka yesterday (3rd January 2008) formally notified the Norwegian Government of its decision to terminate the Agreement on a "Ceasefire (CFA) between the Government of the Democratic Socialist Republic of Sri Lanka and the Liberation Tigers of Tamil Eelam" concluded on 22nd February 2002. This notification was in terms of Article 4:4 of this Agreement and will take effect 14 days from the date of this notice i.e. 16th January 2008. Accordingly, the Status of Mission Agreement (SOMA) on the Establishment and the Management of the Sri Lanka Monitoring Mission (SLMM) dated 18th March 2002 between the Royal Norwegian Government and the Government of the Democratic Socialist Republic of Sri Lanka will also stand terminated with effect from 16th January 2008."

This was amidst the demands of the defense secretary Gotabhaya Rajapaksa on 29 December 2007. In response, donor countries such as the United States, Canada, and Norway expressed their deep regrets on this decision by the Sri Lankan government. In addition, India also shown its dismay of Sri Lanka's abrogation of the ceasefire.

== War in the North ==
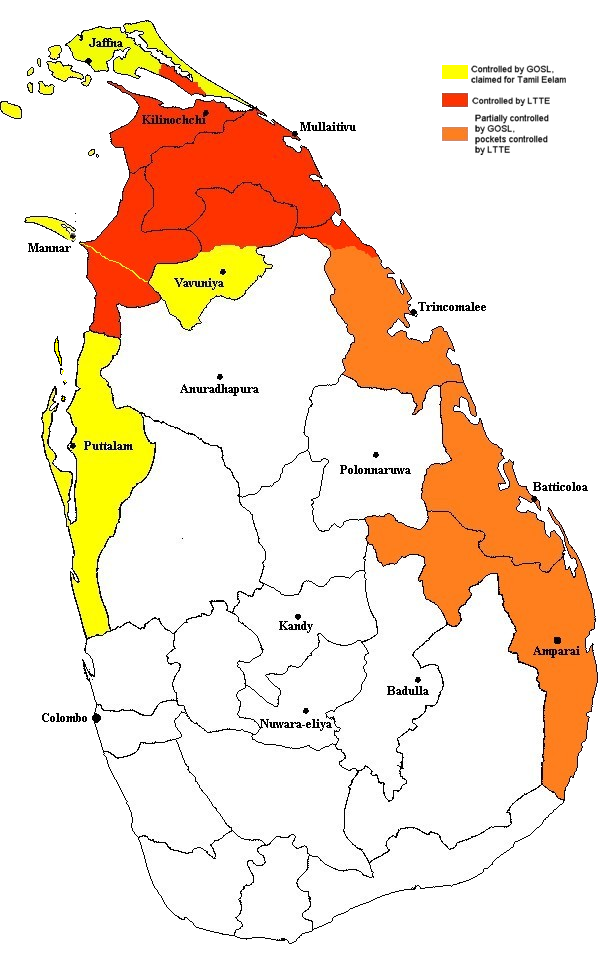
Red area shows the approximate areas of Sri Lanka controlled by the LTTE and the Government, as of December 2005.

In the north of the country, some of the bloodiest fighting since 2001 took place after the LTTE launched massive attacks on Sri Lanka Army defence lines in the Jaffna Peninsula on August 11. The LTTE used a force of 400 to 500 fighters in the attacks which consisted of land and amphibious assaults, and also fired a barrage of artillery at government positions, including the key military airbase at Palali. Initially, the Tigers broke through army defense lines around Muhamalai, and advanced further north, but they were halted after 10 hours of fierce fighting. Isolated battles continued over the next few days, but the LTTE was forced to give up its offensive due to heavy casualties.

From September 2007, the intensity of clashes increased. During clashes in the Forward Defence Lines, separating their forces, both sides exchanged heavy artillery fire, after which military incursions followed. By December 22, 2007, the LTTE defences at Uyilankulama and Thampanaikkulam fell to advancing troops of the Sri Lanka Army. On December 29, 2007, the Army overran the LTTE stronghold at Parappakandal, Mannar.

In an interview with the 'Sunday Observer', the Sri Lankan Army Commander, Lieutenant General Sarath Fonseka, said that the Army had occupied the LTTE's Forward Defence Lines and surrounded the LTTE bases in Wanni from all directions. In addition, he stated that there were around 3,000 Tigers remaining, and that the military targets to annihilate them within the first six months of 2008. However, less optimistic statements by Army, Air Force and Navy commanders were delivered the next day.

The military of Sri Lanka also claimed that the leader of the LTTE, Velupillai Prabhakaran, was seriously injured during air strikes carried out by the Sri Lanka Air Force on a bunker complex in Jayanthinagar on November 26, 2007. Earlier, on November 2, 2007, S. P. Thamilselvan, the head of the rebels' political wing, was killed during another government air raid. On January 5, 2008,a pro-LTTE website reported that the Head of LTTE Military Intelligence, Colonel Charles, was killed in a claymore ambush by a suspected Sri Lanka Army Deep Penetration Unit.

Before the government offensive, the war in the Northern front was in a stalemate due to the unique topology of the two major Forward Defence Lines, The Nagarcoil FDL and The Muhamalai FDL.

== Capture of Mannar District ==
On 2 August 2008 the Sri Lankan army captured the town of Vellankulam which was the last bastion of Tigers in the Mannar district. This marked the capture of the entire Mannar district by the Army which took eight months.

== Battles at sea ==
=== Battle of Point Pedro ===
The Sri Lankan Navy was attacked by a group of Tamil Tiger boats. A group of SLN attack boats was escorting a troop transport, the MV Pearl Cruise II which was carrying 710 soldiers for the city of Jaffna which had been under siege for the previous six years.

On 18 October 2006 a suicide attack was carried out by 15 Sea Tigers of the Liberation Tigers of Tamil Eelam (LTTE) on the commercial Galle Harbour and Sri Lanka Navy base SLNS Dakshina in the tourist town of Galle in southern Sri Lanka.

The Battle of Point Pedro 2007 was a naval battle that occurred on June 19, 2007 near Point Pedro, Jaffna, Sri Lanka. The battle took place when Sri Lankan Navy patrol boats were attacked by a group of Tamil Tiger patrol boats off the shore of Point Pedro.

The Battle of Delft was a naval battle on December 25, 2007 and part of the Sri Lankan Civil War. The Sri Lankan Navy claimed that it received reports of a boat cluster moving off of Delft Island. After moving in to investigate clashes erupted and fierce sea battle ensued. Both sides claimed to have victory. The pro-rebel Tamilnet claimed that the Sea Tigers sank one Sri Lankan Navy vessel and the Sri Lankan Navy suffered casualty. However, the Sri Lankan Defense ministry claimed that 6 Tiger boats were sunk and over 40 Tigers were killed.

On March 22, 2008, a Navy fast attack boat was destroyed after it hit a suspected sea mine laid by Tamil Tiger rebels off the country's north-east coast.

As one of the turning point of the Eelam War IV, Sri Lanka Navy ships destroyed 8 LTTE floating warehouses which carried 100,000 each of 122, 130 and 155mm Artillery Ammunition and 60mm and 81mm Mortar Ammunitions. This was the first time Sri Lanka Navy conduct a mission in 4000 km deep into the International sea.

== The air war ==
The battle in air is significant for both sides (GoSL and LTTE) in this phase of war. The Sri Lankan Air Force used its attack aircraft to carry out a bombing campaign against identified LTTE targets. The LTTE Air Tigers also used its light aircraft to carry out bombing on the Sri Lankan military.

=== Major air strikes of SLAF ===
- On 14 August 2006 the SLAF bombed a facility in the rebel-held Mullaitivu area. The LTTE claimed 61 girls were killed, the SLMM stated they were able to count just 19 bodies. The government claimed that it was an LTTE training facility and that the children were LTTE child soldiers, although the LTTE claimed the victims were schoolgirls attending a course on first aid at an orphanage. A team from UNICEF and the Swedish-led Sri Lanka Monitoring Mission (SLMM) visited the bombed site and said they had found no evidence to support claims the rebels had been using the facility as a military training centre.
- On 7 May 2007 at about 0725 supersonic fighter jets of the SLAF bombed a strategic LTTE base and a large fuel storage at Ramanatpuram East of Iranamadu.
- In November 2007, Thamilselvan, along with five other high ranking Tamil rebels were killed by a precision air strike carried out by the SLAF on an undisclosed location near the rebels's stronghold town of Kilinochchi.

=== LTTE air strikes ===
- LTTE air strikes occurred for the first time in history on March 26, 2007 on a SLAF base at Katunayake, killing three Air Force personnel and wounding several.
- LTTE aircraft attacked Palali military complex by dropping bombs on April 23, 2007, killing six soldiers and wounding 13.
- The LTTE attacked Katunayake air base for the second time on April 26, 2007, one month after their first attack on the same location.
- in the early hours of April 29, 2007, LTTE aircraft bombed two fuel tanks at Kolonnawa and Muthurajawela close to Colombo.

Palali raid

On 23 April, the Air Tigers conducted their second raid. One aircraft flew toward the Palali Air Base near Jaffna, which is the main military complex in the region. Anti‐aircraft fire prevented the aircraft from bombing the runways, but it instead dropped its bombs on a nearby military bunker, killing six soldiers.

Colombo raids

On 26 April, Sri Lanka's air defences in Colombo fired into the sky following reports that unidentified aircraft had been spotted on radar. No attack was reported.

However, a few days later on the early morning of April 29, while the entire nation was watching the Cricket World Cup Final a Tiger aircraft bombed two fuel storage facilities outside Colombo. Chaos followed and electricity in the capital was shut off for nearly an hour. There were no casualties and minimal damage. The security forces were unable to bring down the aircraft prompting much criticism from the public and opposition political parties.

Although the government played down the attack, Shell's Sri Lankan country director, Hassan Madan, told the AFP "There was big damage to our fire-fighting facility and we estimate it will cost us in excess of 75 million rupees ($US700,000) to put things back".

22 October 2007, Air Tigers launched a pre-dawn combined arms assault on a SLAF airbase at Anuradhapura, about 212 kilometers (132 mi) north of the capital, Colombo.

According to the Ministry of Defence, the assault started at around 3:20 am, with LTTE ground forces attacking the airbase and overrunning key positions, including an anti-aircraft position, before Air Tiger ultralights dropped bombs on government positions. This resulted in the destruction of eight aircraft and damage to several others. The attack only affected the SLAF's training element.

== The conclusion of the war ==
On 19 May 2009, the Sri Lankan military effectively concluded its 26-year operation against the LTTE. The 58 Division of the Sri Lankan Army led by Brig. Shavendra Silva, 59 Division led by Brig. Prasanna de Silva and the 53 Division commanded by Gen. Kamal Gunaratne, after having boxed in the remaining LTTE cadres into a small area of territory near Nandhikkadal lagoon, linked up and eliminated the remaining cadres. This final battle claimed the lives of several top LTTE leaders, including Jeyam, Bhanu, Lawrence, Pappa, Laxamanan, Balasingham Nadesan, Pottu Amman, Soosai and Velupillai Prabhakaran who was reported to have attempted to flee. On the morning of the 19th, soldiers of the 4th Vijayabahu infantry regiment led by Lt. Col Rohitha Aluvihare claimed to have found the body of Prabhakaran, and so militarily ending a separatist war that had defined Sri Lanka's history for three decades.

On 22 May 2009, Sri Lankan Secretary of Defence Gotabhaya Rajapaksa confirmed that 6,261 personnel of the Sri Lankan Armed Forces had lost their lives and 29,551 were wounded during Eelam War IV since July 2006. Brig. Udaya Nanayakkara added that approximately 22,000 LTTE cadres had died during this time.

== Chronology of towns captured by the government of Sri Lanka ==
Area Liberated	Division/Task Force	Date
Silawaturai		2 September 2007
Madhu church complex	57 Division	24 April 2008
Adampan town	58 Division	9 May 2008
Palampiddi Town	57 Division	16 May 2008
Mundumurippu Village	57 Division	23 May 2008
Munagam Base	59 Division	30 May 2008
Periyamadhu Village	57 Division	15 June 2008
Mullikkandal, Minnaniranchan and Marattikannaddi Villages	58 Division	24 June 2008
"The Mannar Rice Bowl": Alankulama, Andankulama, Alakaddiveli, Parappakandal, Parappukadatan, Papamoddai, Odupallam, Neduvarampu, Kannaputtukulama and Vannakulama Villages	58 Division	29 June 2008
Uyilankulam		29 June 2008
Linked up with 57 Division - south west of Periyamadhu	58 Division	30 June 2008
Michael Base	59 Division	4 July 2008
Naddankandal Village	57 Division	11 July 2008
Navvi village	Task Force 2	11 July 2008
Vidattaltivu Town	58 Division	16 July 2008
Iluppaikkadavai		20 July 2008
Suganthan camp	59 Division	27 July 2008
Illuppaikkadavai Town	58 Division	2 August 2008
Vellankulam Town, Mulankavil and Pallavarayankaddu areas	58 Division	12 August 2008
Kalvilan Village	57 Division	13 August 2008
Jeevan Base	59 Division	16 August 2008
West of Nayaroo lagoon	59 Division	21 August 2008
Nachchikudha	58 Division	21 August 2008
Thunukkai and Uilankulam Towns	57 Division	22 August 2008
Mallavi Town	57 Division	2 September 2008
Maniyankulama	58 Division	16 October 2008
Vannerikkulama	58 Division	20 October 2008
Gajabapura	59 Division	23 October 2008
Nochchimodai	58 Division	28 October 2008
Jeyapuram and Nachchikuda	58 Division	29 October 2008
Akkarayankulam tank bund	57 Division	29 October 2008
Akkarayankulam built-up	57 Division	5 November 2008
Kiranchi	58 Division	10 November 2008
Kumulamunai village	59 Division	11 November 2008
Palavi		11 November 2008
Valaippadu		13 November 2008
Devil's Point and Vallaipadu	58 Division	13 November 2008
Pooneryn	58 Division	15 November 2008
Mankulama	Task Force 3	17 November 2008
Mankulam		17 November 2008
Olumadu	Task Force 3	25 November 2008
Otiyamalai	59 Division	29 November 2008
Kokavil Town	57 Division	1 December 2008
Puliyankulam	Task Force 2	4 December 2008
Kanakarayankulam	Task Force 2	5 December 2008
Terumurikandy junction	57 Division	10 December 2008
Ampakamam	Task Force 3	15 December 2008
Nadunkerni	Task Force 4	20 December 2008
Sinna-Paranthan	58 Division	23 December 2008
Nalanawakulam Village	58 Division	26 December 2008
Mulliyawalai	59 Division	26 December 2008
Iranamadu		1 January 2009
Paranthan	58 Division	1 January 2009
Kilinochchi Town	57 Division	2 January 2009
Oddusuddan	Task Force 4	4 January 2009
Ramanathapuram	57 Division	7 January 2009
Murasumoddai	58 Division	8 January 2009
Elephant Pass		9 January 2009
Keridattadu	Task Force 4	12 January 2009
Jaffna Peninsula		14 January 2009
Dharmapuram	58 Division	15 January 2009
Udayarkattukulam Tank Bund	Task Force 2	24 January 2009
Mullaittivu Town	59 Division	25 January 2009
Visuamadu Town	57 Division	28 January 2009
Visuamadu Town	58 Division	28 January 2009
Chalai	55 Division	5 February 2009
Thevipuram	58 Division	20 February 2009
Iranapalai Junction	58 Division	12 March 2009
Pachchapulmuddai	53 Division	17 March 2009
Pachchapulmuddai	58 Division	1 April 2009
Puthukkudiyirippu Hospital	53 Division	1 April 2009
Puthukkudiyiruppu	58 Division	5 April 2009
Puthukkudiyiruppu	53 Division	5 April 2009

== Killings of LTTE Leaders ==
- Velupillai Prabhakaran was killed by government troops. His body was identified through DNA testing on 19 May 2009.
- Soosai, leader of the Sea Tigers, and Pottu Amman, head of the LTTE intelligence wing, were killed along with Prabhakaran.
- Charles Anthony was confirmed dead on May 18, 2009. SL Army has confirmed that the body found in Vellamullivaikkal is that of LTTE chief's son.
- Three bodies recovered by SL troops have been identified as those of Nadesan, Puleethevan and Ramesh on 18 May 2009.

== Assassinations ==
- Sri Lankan Foreign Minister Lakshman Kadirgamar, a Tamil who was highly respected by foreign diplomats and who had been sharply critical of the LTTE, was assassinated at his home on August 12, 2005, allegedly by an LTTE sniper. His assassination led to the marginalisation of the LTTE from the international community.
- The assassination of a well renowned Tamil diplomat, the Deputy Peace Secretariat General for Co-ordinating the Peace Process (SCOPP) Kethesh Loganathan on August 12, 2006 at Dehiwala by shooting at around 9:30 pm. He had been very keen to bring peace to the country and also participated in Thimphu peace talks in 1980s. Rajapakse condemned the murder and blamed the LTTE.
- The assassination of the head Priest of the Santhiveli Pilleyar Kovil Selliah Parameswaran Kurukkal on February 7, 2007 in his home Batticaloa. The LTTE and the Sri Lankan Government blamed each other for this murder. TULF leader V. Anandasangaree also blamed the LTTE
- UNP Parliamentarian T. Maheshwaran. Government paramilitaries were blamed
- A roadside bomb killed Non-cabinet Nation Building Minister D. M. Dassanayake on January 8, 2008 at Ja-Ela town, located 19 km north of Colombo city.
- A suspected LTTE suicide bomber killed cabinet Minister of Highways & Road Development Jeyaraj Fernandopulle on April 6, 2008 at Weliveriya Gampaha district.
- The 12-year-old son of Velupillai Prabhakaran was executed in May 2009.

== Impact of war into civilian life ==
Amnesty International has also stated that increasing violence was forcing many Sri Lankans to flee the country and that more than 2,800 people had sought shelter in India this year. The state's failure to provide adequate security and to ensure that attacks against civilians are prosecuted has resulted in widespread fear and panic. Amnesty international also accused the LTTE of breaking the international law by using civilians as buffers against the army. A researcher for the organisation stated that there were cases where militants had forced people to stay in rebel-held areas to hamper army operations. The United Nations reported more than 20,000 civilians were killed in this recent war.

Civilians flee the Vanni, January 2009
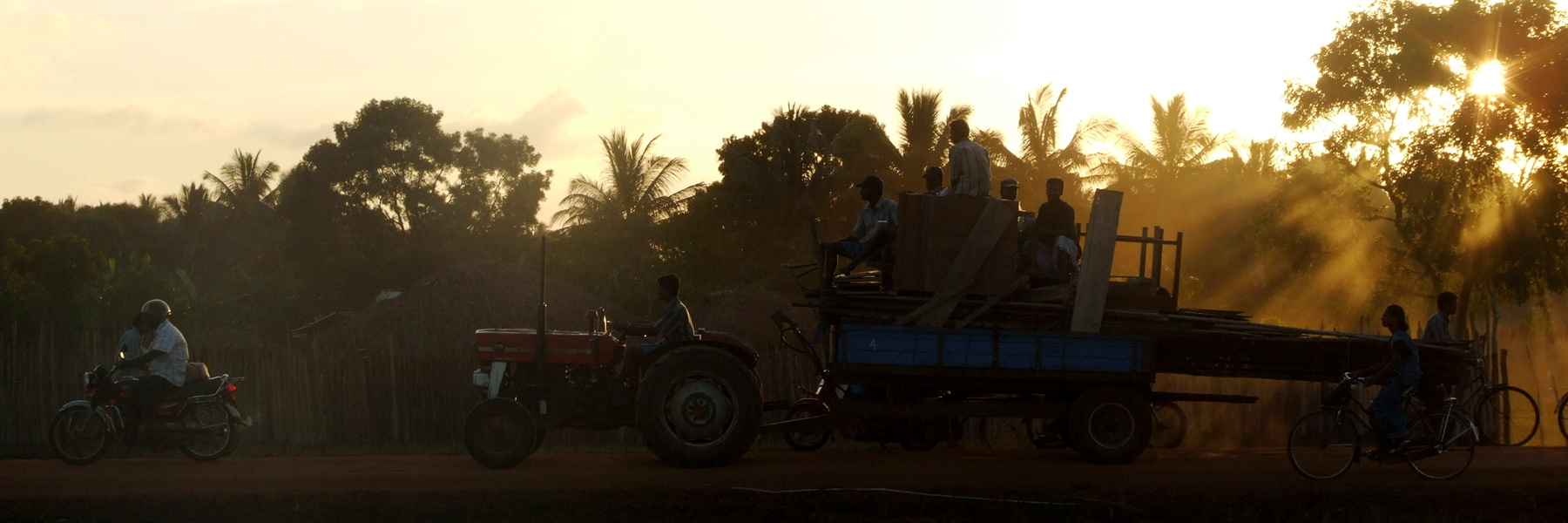

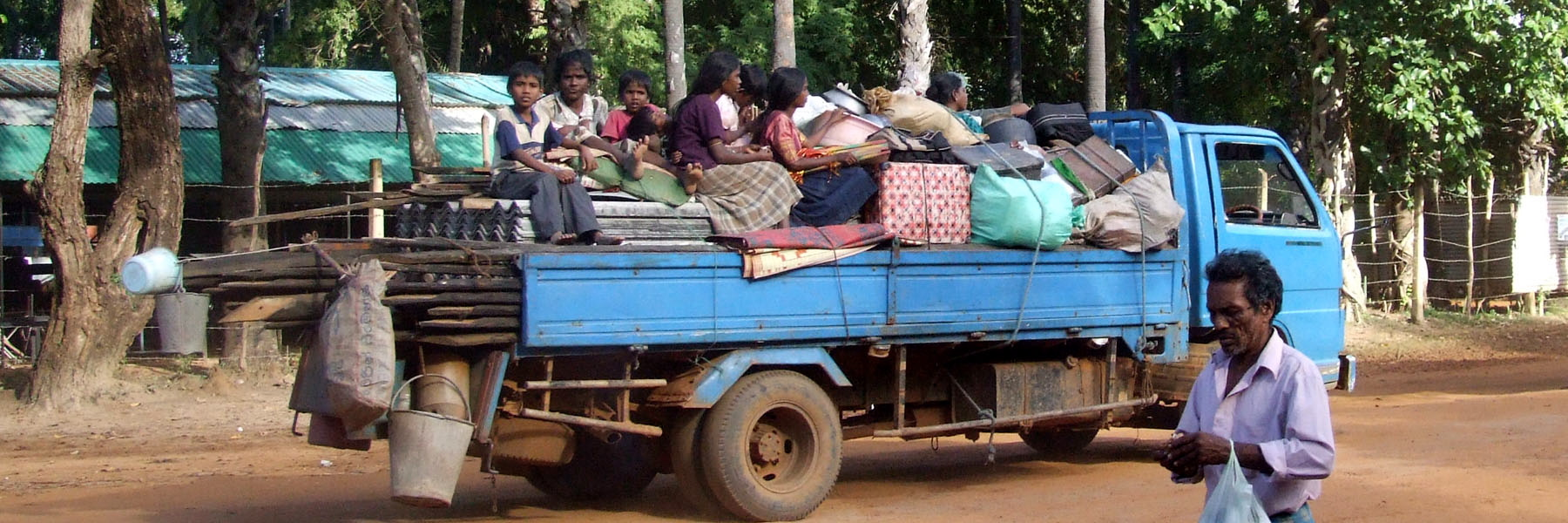

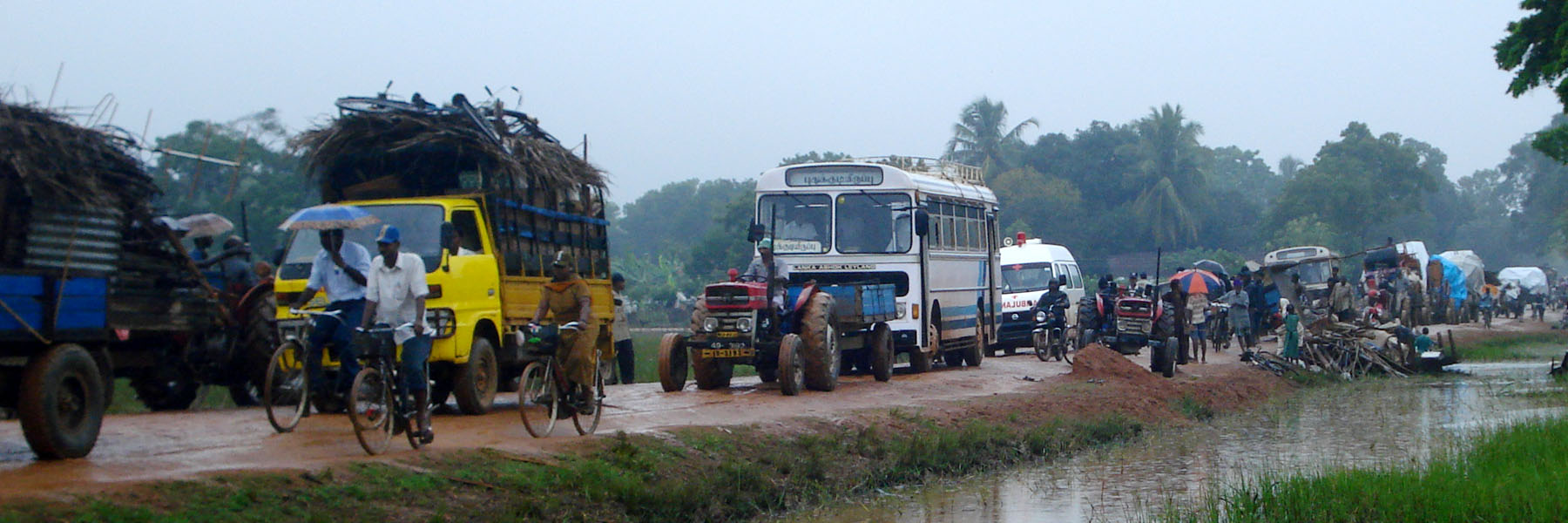

Since the upsurge in violence in April, nearly 40,000 people were displaced. This came amidst the government's air strikes on civilian areas in the East. Amnesty International quoted UN figures to say that a total of 39,883 people had been displaced in the north and east since 7 April adding that a total of 314,378 people were displaced by the conflict while around 325,000 people were estimated to have been displaced by the tsunami.

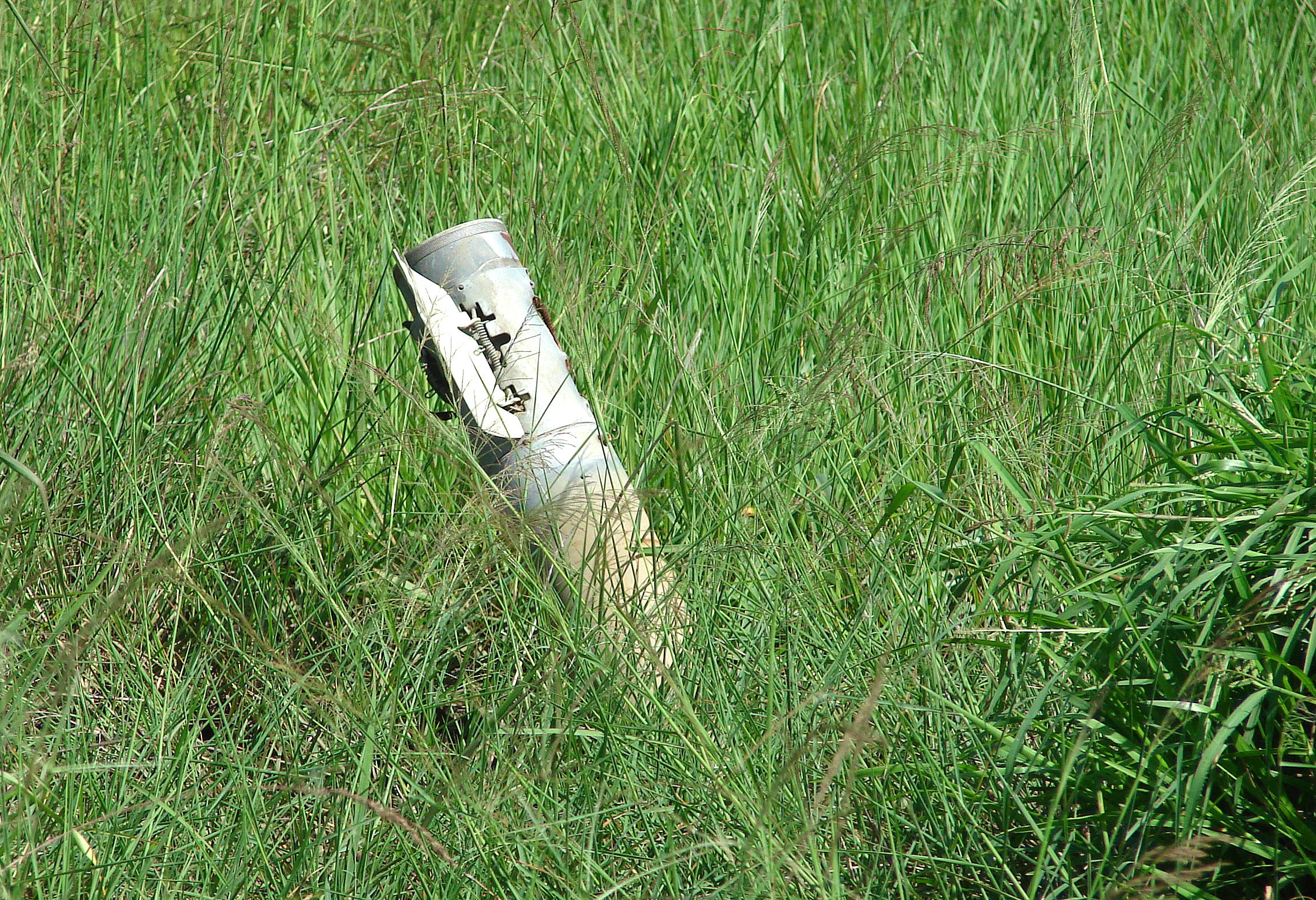
An unexploded 122mm projectile of a multiple rocket launcher stuck into muddy land in Vaharai, Batticaloa

After the International Council of Red Cross, doctors and government officials left the war zone, only the Catholic priests remained with people until the end. One of the priests, Rev. Fr. Mariampillai Sarathjeevan who was leading the refugees to safety, also died in the war zone. The people and the priest did not have food for five days, and exhausted by months of hardship. Unconfirmed reports indicate that the priest was assaulted by soldiers when he approached them for help.

Stephen Rapp, the U.S. ambassador at large for war crimes issues, called for war crimes investigation in October 2009. His department submitted a detailed report to Congress about the incidents happened during the recent conflict in Sri Lanka. On 25 October 2009 The Office of the High Commissioner for Human Rights of the United Nations called for an independent, international investigation of possible war crimes committed during the last few months of the war in Sri Lanka. Internal Displacement Monitoring Center of the Norwegian Refugee Council reported that the government of Sri Lanka was holding nearly 300,000 displaced people in military-run internment camps under questionable humanitarian conditions.

== See also ==
- Eastern Theatre of Eelam War IV
- Northern Theatre of Eelam War IV
- Aftermath of the Sri Lankan Civil War
- Eelam War I
- Eelam War II
- Eelam War III
- Phases of the Sri Lankan Civil War
