= Battle of Kilinochchi (2008–2009) =

Sri Lankan civil war battle

- Part of the Sri Lankan Civil War, 2008–2009 SLA Northern offensive
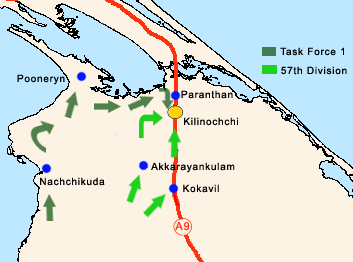
- The advance of the 57 Division and Task Force 1 on Kilinochchi
Date	23 November 2008 – 2 January 2009
Location	Kilinochchi, Northern Sri Lanka 9°23′N 80°24′E
Result	Sri Lankan Army victory

Belligerents
Sri Lanka	Liberation Tigers of Tamil Eelam

Commanders and leaders
Lt. Gen Sarath Fonseka; Brig. Shavendra Silva; Maj. Gen Jagath Dias	Velupillai Prabhakaran; Colonel Theepan; Colonel Bhanu; Lt Col Lawrence

Units involved
Sri Lanka Armed Forces: Sri Lanka Army; 58 Division (Task Force 1); 57 Division	Liberation Tigers of Tamil Eelam: Charles Anthony Brigade; Jeyanthan Brigade; Imran Pandyan Brigade

Casualties and losses
1,000+ killed; 2,200+ wounded (LTTE claim)	Heavy
- 300,000+ Tamil civilians flee to the Puthukkudiyiruppu Area. Both parties claimed to have inflicted heavy casualties on the other while suffering minimal losses.

The Battle of Kilinochchi was a land battle fought between the Sri Lankan Military and the Liberation Tigers of Tamil Eelam (LTTE) for control of the town of Kilinochchi in the Northern Theatre of Eelam War IV during the Sri Lankan civil war between November 2008 and January 2009. The town of Kilinochchi was the administrative center and de facto capital of the LTTE's proposed state of Tamil Eelam.

The Sri Lankan Army (SLA) conducted an offensive through November and December 2008, during which three attempts were made to capture the town during December. These were thwarted by the LTTE, and both sides claimed that they suffered minimal casualties while inflicting maximum damage on the other during these assaults. The Sri Lanka Air Force launched air strikes against LTTE positions in Kilinochchi throughout this period. On 2 January 2009m divisions of the Sri Lanka Army advanced into Kilinochchi from the northern, southern and western directions of the town, and the LTTE fighters withdrew into positions in nearby jungles. Mahinda Rajapaksa, the president of Sri Lanka, later announced that the military had taken control of the town and urged the LTTE to lay down arms and surrender. However, the LTTE stated that the SLA captured a "ghost town" after they withdrew, and described it as an insignificant loss.

After Kilinochchi was captured, several foreign governments urged both parties to seek a political solution. The Colombo Stock Exchange recorded a rise and the rupee stabilised, while celebrators lit firecrackers on the streets soon after the capture was declared. Amidst the celebrations, a suicide bomb attack occurred in the evening in front of the Air Force headquarters in Colombo, killing three and wounding about 30. The SLA continued to advance into LTTE-held territory, capturing some more strategically important locations, including Elephant Pass and the entire A9 Highway soon after the fall of Kilinochchi.

== History and background ==
The Sri Lanka Army withdrew from Kilinochchi in 1990, enabling the LTTE to take control of the town for the first time. The SLA recaptured it during operations Sathjaya I, II and III in September 1996. However, the LTTE launched Operation Unceasing Waves II in September 1998 and captured the town again, forcing the SLA to vacate it. This battle caused heavy casualties to both sides, and the loss was described by the then military spokesman, Brig. Sunil Tennakoon, as "the largest blow after Mullaitivu".

Although Kilinochchi is not a strategically important location in terms of military operations, it bears a symbolic importance because of the LTTE using it as the de facto capital of Tamil Eelam, the separate state that the LTTE is fighting for. Vinayagamoorthy Muralitharan, alias Col. Karuna, a former commander of the LTTE, claimed that the town of Kilinochchi was important for the LTTE because it was the showcase of the organization According to government claims, all civil administrative affairs were handled by government authorities despite the LTTE being in control of the town.

=== Administrative Capital ===
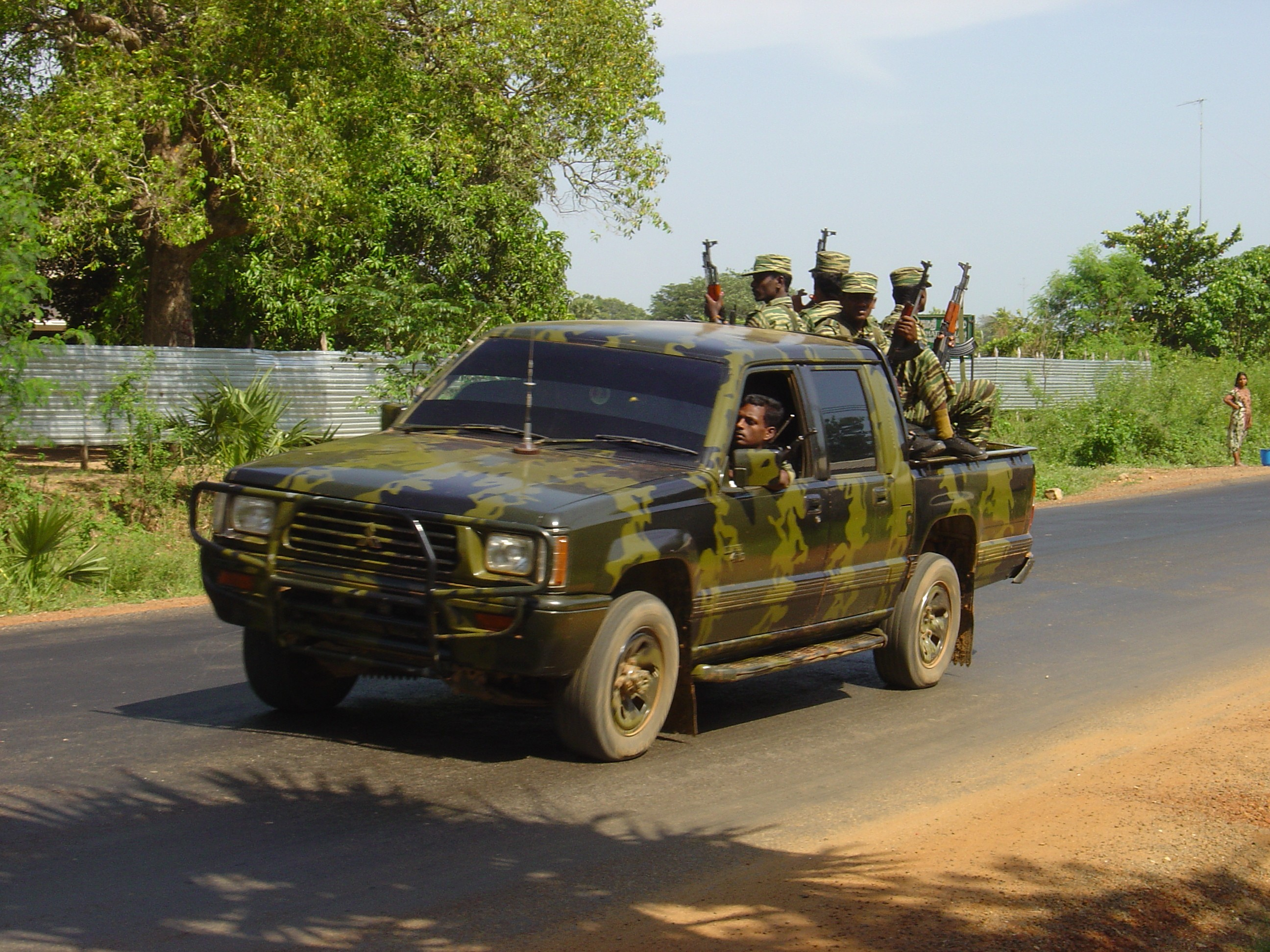
LTTE patrol in Killinochchi, 2004

After 2002, the LTTE used Kilinochchi as the administrative hub of the area under its control. The LTTE established a police force, named Tamil Eelam Police Force, Peace Secretariat and Bank in areas under its control and Kilinochchi housed the headquarters for these entities. The Tamil Tigers also established and implemented a Judicial system which consisted of district courts, high courts and supreme court as well as a court of appeal. The supreme court was also located in Kilinochchi.

== Preparations ==
After the Sri Lankan military captured the Eastern Province from the LTTE, it advanced rapidly into LTTE-held territory in the Northern Province. The town of Kilinochchi was a major target for the troops during this offensive. With the SLA advancing on several fronts, the 57 Division and Task Force 1 (now 58 Division) operated on the Kilinochchi front with the objective of capturing the town. The overall operation was led by Maj Gen. Jagath Jayasuriya, the Wanni Security Forces Commander. Both divisions advanced from the west of the country, with 57 Division approaching Kilinochchi from the south and west while Task Force 1 advanced further northwards, capturing other key LTTE strongholds in order to converge on Kilinochchi from the north. By early October, Kilinochchi had been vacated by its residents and units of the Kilinochchi hospital, banks and several government institutions were relocated at Tharmapuram, a village 13 kilometres (8 mi) away.

57 Division, led by Maj. Gen. Jagath Dias, captured Akkarayankulam on 18 October 2008, a large village located to the southwest of Kilinochchi. The capture of this village enabled the SLA to attack Kilinochchi from the southwest. The Iranamadu junction, located to the south of Kilinochchi, was captured later, enabling the SLA to advance towards Kilinochchi from the south. Troops from the 57 Division earlier captured several LTTE strongholds such as Adampan and Kokavil

Task Force 1, led by Brig. Shavendra Silva, advanced along the western coast, capturing several strategically important locations including the Mannar "Rice Bowl" area, Viddathalthivu, and Nachchikuda. Task Force 1 launched an attack on Pooneryn on 15 November 2008, spearheaded by troops from the 2nd and 3rd Commando Regiments and a squadron of Special Forces, and captured the area. From there, Task Force 1 moved west and captured Paranthan on 31 December 2008, enabling the SLA to attack Kilinochchi from the north.

The LTTE used their self-styled "Ditch-cum-bund" strategy to defend the town and constructed earth bunds and trenches around the area in an "L" shape to halt the advance of the Sri Lankan military. One such earth bund was constructed to the south. Another stretched across the B69 Pooneryn-Paranthan road, along the western side of the town. The LTTE had deployed its elite units, the Charles Anthony, the Jeyanthan, and Imran Pandian brigades along with other regular units under the overall command of Colonel Theepan with logistical and material support from Colonel Bhanu and Lt Col Lawrence for the defence of Kilinochchi. Meanwhile, the SLA began launching artillery attacks, while the Air Force launched air raids against LTTE positions in and around Kilinochchi. One such attack targeted the LTTE office complex in Kilinochchi. The government declared in October 2008 that it was ready to capture Kilinochchi. However, LTTE leader Velupillai Prabhakaran declared in an email interview that capturing Kilinochchi was "just a daydream of President Mahinda Rajapaksa".

== Timeline ==
The Sri Lankan military began attacking Kilinochchi from three directions on 23 November 2008. Throughout December the SLA conducted three offensives in an attempt to take Kilinochchi. Heavy monsoon rains affected both sides during November and December, with floods covering a large area in and around Kilinochchi. Troop movements were limited by this, and mines had been scattered around the area by the flood waters. Throughout the offensive, the Sri Lanka Air Force carried out numerous air strikes against Kilinochchi in support of the SLA.

On 10 December 2008 the LTTE claimed to have blunted the first SLA offensive and killed 89 soldiers. However, the SLA claimed to have lost only 20 soldiers and killed 27 rebels.

On 16 December 2008 the SLA launched a multi-front offensive against Kilinochchi. This assault was defeated by the LTTE, which claimed that SLA casualties in this battle were 130 soldiers dead and more than 300 wounded. They also claimed to have captured 28 bodies of army soldiers. However, the SLA denied this and claimed to have had only 25 soldiers killed, 18 missing and 160 wounded while they killed 120 Tigers. Heavy artillery and mortar fire was exchanged between both sides during the battle. Fighting continued for 10 days after this battle, during which period the SLA managed to capture some parts of the earth bund to the west of Kilinochchi.

On 20 December 2008 the LTTE mounted a counteroffensive as SLA forces were preparing an assault to capture the village of Iranamadu, located to the south of Kilinochchi. The LTTE claimed that at least 60 soldiers were killed in the battle, but these claims were again disputed by military spokesman Brig. Udaya Nanayakkara, who claimed that SLA losses were 12 killed and 12 missing.

=== Capture ===
LTTE started to withdraw its personnel from Kilinochchi with the fall of Paranthan on 31 December 2008, as divisions of the Sri Lanka Army began surrounding the town. On 2 January 2009 the Sri Lanka Army entered the town of Kilinochchi. The SLA claimed it encountered only minimal resistance once it entered the town, as the rebels had withdrawn to positions in nearby jungles. According to the military spokesman Brig. Udaya Nanayakkara, the SLA entered the town from three directions, overcoming pockets of LTTE resistance. The troop movements started on the dawn of 2 January 2009 when units of the 57 Division advanced 1 kilometre (1 mi) across the built-up area to the west of Kilinochchi, and entered the town center. More units of the 57 Division moved into the town from the south, while Task Force 1 also advanced into the town from the north along the west and east of the A9 highway.

After the capture of the town, the National Flag of Sri Lanka was raised at the town center by the commanding officer of the 57 Division, Maj. Gen. Jagath Dias, along with the flags of Sri Lanka Army, Air Force and the 57 Division.

The infrastructure of the town was heavily damaged when the SLA took control of it. Most of the houses were badly damaged and a large water tank had been destroyed, which the SLA said had been done by the LTTE using explosives. According to a senior commander of the SLA, the LTTE had damaged the town's infrastructure to obstruct the advance of the Sri Lankan military. Power supply lines in Kilinochchi had also been damaged. However, the LTTE claimed that the town's infrastructure had been destroyed by artillery attacks and air raids carried out by the Sri Lankan military.

== Reactions ==
The President of Sri Lanka, Mahinda Rajapaksa, announced the capture of Kilinochchi at the Presidential Secretariat on the evening of 2 January and called for the LTTE to lay down arms and surrender, stating that this would be the "final message" to the LTTE. In his speech he stated that:

What our heroic troops have achieved is not only the capture of the great fortress of the LTTE, but a major victory in the world's battle against terrorism.

The Island editorial described the capture of Kilinochchi as a blow to global terror and that it has sent a strong message that the civilized world is capable of eliminating the scourge of terrorism.

Pro-rebel website Tamilnet reported that LTTE fighters and civilians had moved further northeast, and the Sri Lankan military had entered a "virtual ghost town". Balasingham Nadesan, the LTTE's political head, observed that the loss of Kilinochchi was an insignificant setback in the context of their liberation struggle, claiming that:

Kilinochchi town was captured more than once by the Sri Lanka military earlier. Similarly, we have also recaptured the town on earlier occasions.

Several foreign governments expressed their views on the capture of Kilinochchi soon after the event. On 2 January 2009 the United States Department of State urged the Sri Lankan government and Tamil Tigers to start negotiating over the "legitimate issues" of the Tamils.

India's Foreign Secretary Shivshankar Menon stated that there would be no military solution for the problems that are faced by Sri Lanka, regardless of how the military situation fluctuates. He mentioned that there should be a "political understanding within the framework of a united Sri Lanka" within which all communities can be comfortable.

A statement was issued by the United Kingdom government as well, urging Sri Lanka to find a political solution. Their statement said that the need for a political solution was "even more urgent" now with the Sri Lankan military capturing Kilinochchi. In addition, Minister of State for the Foreign and Commonwealth Office of the British Government, Lord Malloch Brown and Secretary of State for International Development, Douglas Alexander, urged both parties of the conflict to respect International Humanitarian Law.

The news of the fall of Kilinochchi to the Sri Lankan military resulted in celebration, including gathering on the streets and lighting firecrackers, in places like Nuwara Eliya, Anuradhapura, Colombo, Ampara and Kalutara. The government of Sri Lanka claimed that the population in Jaffna celebrated the capture by raising the national flag with anti-LTTE slogans and demonstrations. However Tamilnet, the pro-rebel website, denied these claims and said that the public was forced to take part in the celebrations. It claimed that the Sri Lankan Army confiscated the National identity cards of many residents in order to force them to take part. The country officially marked the capture of Kilinochchi on 5 January by hoisting the national flag and observing two minutes of silence to honour the troops, while television and radio stations either blacked out their regular bulletins during this time or played patriotic songs.

== Aftermath ==
Following the capture of Kilinochchi by the SLA, the Colombo Stock Exchange recorded a rise of around 5 percent on the news and the Sri Lankan rupee became steady. A few hours after the president of Sri Lanka declared the victory, a suicide bombing was carried out outside the Air Force headquarters in Colombo, in which two Air Force police officers and a member of the bomb-disposal unit were killed and 30 people wounded. On 3 January 2009, at least three people were injured in another explosion that occurred in Pettah Market, triggered under a parked vehicle. On 6 January, an armed group attacked and damaged the Maharaja Television/Broadcasting Network studios of Capital Maharaja in Pannipitiya, after state-owned media accused the media organization of not giving sufficient airtime to report the capture of Kilinochchi. Reporters Without Borders condemned this attack, observing that it seemed to have occurred because the media organization's "coverage was not patriotic enough".

Soon after the capture of Kilinochchi, the government decided to ban the LTTE. The ban was put into effect from midnight on 7 January, for "using civilians as human shields in uncleared areas and endangering their lives, despite requests by the government to release them".

The military continued its advance into LTTE-held territory and captured the key LTTE position at Pallai within a few days. Soon afterward, on 9 January, the SLA captured the strategically important Elephant Pass area, which links the Jaffna Peninsula with the mainland. The SLA is continued its offensive with the objective of capturing Mullaitivu, the only remaining major stronghold of the LTTE. Mullaitivu was also captured on 25 January.

== See also ==
- 1998 Battle of Kilinochchi
- List of Sri Lankan Civil War battles
