= Iranamadu Airport =

- IATA: none; ICAO: none

Summary
- Airport type: Military/Public
- Owner: Government of Sri Lanka
- Operator: Sri Lanka Air Force
- Serves: Kilinochchi
- Location: Iranamadu, Sri Lanka
- Built: 2003
- In use: 2003 - 2009 (Used by TAF), 2011 - present (Used by SLAF)
- Commander: M. M. T. C. Manamperi
- Coordinates: 09°18′19.60″N 80°29′15.40″E

Map
- Location in Northern Province

Runways
| Direction | Length | | Surface |
| Direction | m | ft | Surface |
|---|---|---|---|
| 05/23 | 1,500 | 4,900 | Asphalt |

Iranamadu Airport (Tamil: இரணைமடு விமான நிலையம், romanized: Iraṇaimaṭu Vimāṉa Nilaiyam, Sinhala: ඉරණමඩුව ගුවන්තොටුපළ, romanized: Iraṇamaḍuva Guvantoṭupaḷa) is an air force station and domestic airport in Iranamadu in northern Sri Lanka. Located approximately 9.5 km (5.9 miles) south east of the town of Kilinochchi, the airport is also known as Kilinochchi Airport and SLAF Iranamadu. Originally built by the rebel Liberation Tigers of Tamil Eelam in 2003, it was captured by the Sri Lankan military in 2009 and taken over by the Sri Lanka Air Force.

== History ==
The rebel Liberation Tigers of Tamil Eelam first built an airstrip in Iranamadu in the early 1990s. In 1993 they started clearing land south east of the Iranamadu Tank and over the next two years constructed a runway which was opened by LTTE leader Velupillai Prabhakaran on 19 March 1995. The runway was then bombed and destroyed by the Sri Lanka Air Force. In late 2003, during the Norwegian facilitated ceasefire, the LTTE started clearing land at another site, east of Iranamadu Tank. Within a year the LTTE had built a 1,200 m (3,900 ft) runway. The air force bombed the airstrip several times, including in June 2006 after the Kebithigollewa massacre. The airstrip was the launchpad for a number of Air Tigers attacks including the raid on Anuradhapura Air Force Base in October 2007. The Sri Lankan military captured the airstrip on 15 January 2009.

A Sri Lanka Air Force detachment moved onto the site on 21 June 2009. The airstrip became an air station on 3 August 2011. The airstrip was reconstructed in 2011 and opened for light aircraft. The airstrip was then converted into an airport with a 1,500 m (4,900 ft) runway capable of handling the air force's Lockheed C-130 Hercules and Antonov An-32 aircraft. The new airport was officially opened by President Mahinda Rajapaksa, becoming the country's 16th domestic airport.

== Airlines and destinations ==
| Airlines | Destinations |
|---|---|
| Helitours | Colombo-Ratmalana |
