= Battle of Kilinochchi =

Battle of Kilinochchi may refer to:

- Battle of Kilinochchi (1998), occurred in September 1998 for the control of the city of Kilinochchi in Sri Lanka
- Battle of Kilinochchi (2008–2009), lasted between November 2008 and January 2009 as part of the 2008 SLA Northern offensive
