= Lasantha Rodrigo (general) =

Commander of the Sri Lanka Army (2025–2026)

General Lasantha Rodrigo RSP
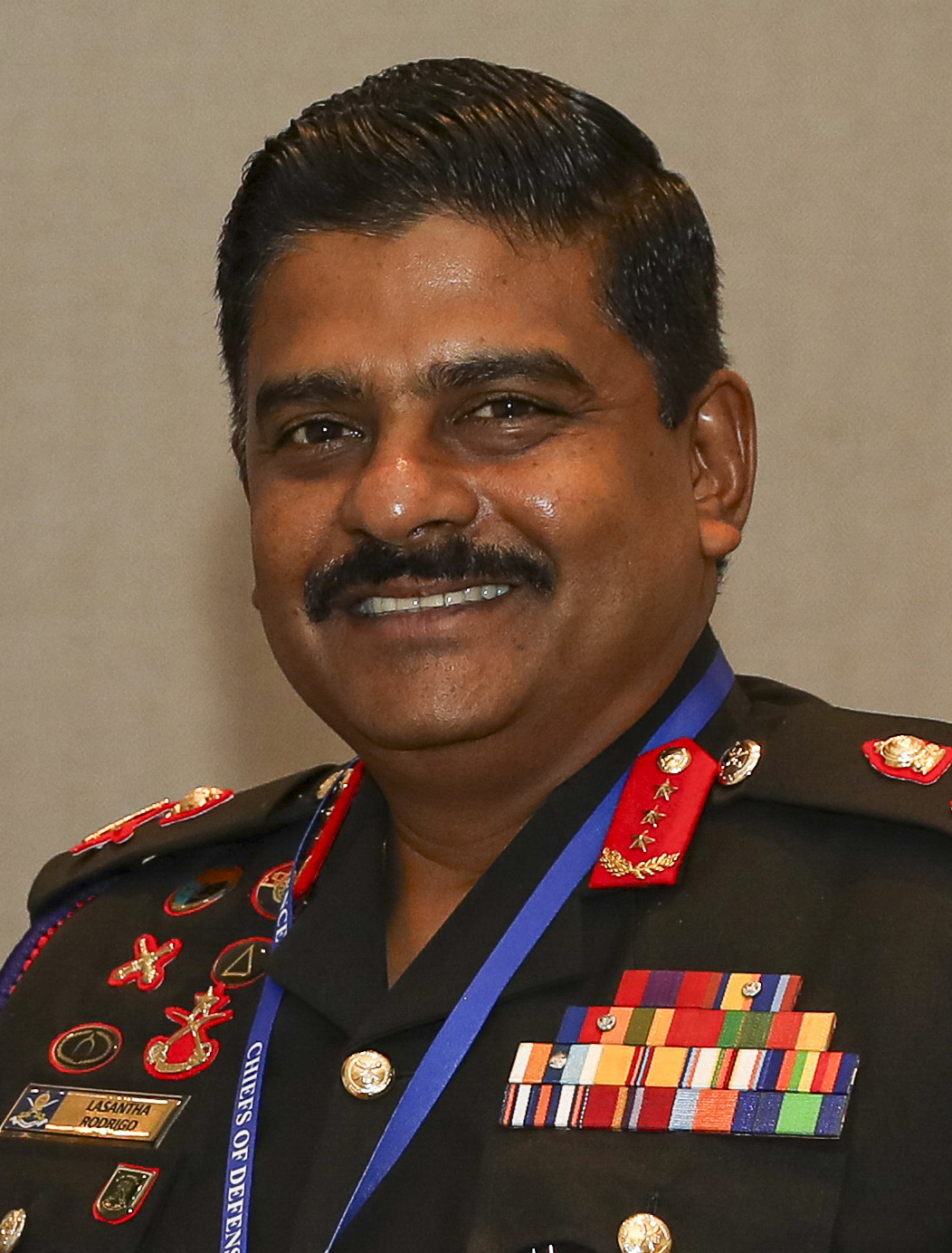
- Rodrigo in 2025
- Education: Indian Military Academy; General Sir John Kotelawala Defence University; National Defense University; Sri Lanka Military Academy; St. Benedict's College, Colombo
- Military career
- Allegiance: Sri Lanka
- Branch: Sri Lanka Army
- Service years: 1989–2026
- Rank: General
- Unit: Sri Lanka Artillery
- Commands: Commander of the Army; Deputy Chief of Staff of the Army; Sri Lanka Army Volunteer Force; Security Forces Headquarters – Central; Defence Services Command and Staff College; 66 Infantry Division
- Conflicts: Sri Lankan Civil War; Operation Yukthiya
- Awards: Rana Sura Padakkama

General Bastian Koralalage Gabrial Maurice Lasantha Rodrigo, RSP, is a Sri Lankan retired army officer, who served as the 25th Commander of the Sri Lanka Army from 31 December 2024 till 31 July 2026.

An alumnus of St. Benedict's College, Colombo, Rodrigo was appointed Commander of the Army on 31 December 2024 succeeding General Vikum Liyanage. He previously served as Deputy Chief of Staff of the Sri Lanka Army from 28 November to 30 December 2024.

== Military career ==
Rodrigo joined the Sri Lanka Army as an officer cadet on 20 January 1989 under Regular Intake - 31. Upon successfully completing officer cadet training in the Sri Lanka Military Academy and in the Indian Military Academy, he was commissioned as a second lieutenant into the Sri Lanka Artillery in 1991.

During his long army career, Rodrigo served as an instructor at the Army Training School, GSO - 2 (Intelligence/Security) at the directorate of operations of the army headquarters, GSO - 2 (Operations) at the headquarters of the 53 Division, GSO - 1 (Operations) of 22 Division. He also served as the commanding officer of 18 Field Regiment Artillery.

He commanded the 663 and the 661 infantry brigades, the 66 Division, the Defence Services Command and Staff College, Security Forces Headquarters - Central and the Sri Lanka Army Volunteer Force.

He completed the basic officer cadet course from the Sri Lanka Military Academy, Diyatalawa and the platoon commanders course at Maduru Oya.

He underwent several courses in India and Pakistan including 'Officer Cadet Course' in Indian Military Academy, Dehradun, India, 'Artillery Young Officers Course' in India and 'Officers Locating Course' in Pakistan.

He holds Masters of Arts in strategic security studies from the National Defense University of the United States and also Masters of Science in security and strategic studies from the General Sir John Kotelawala Defence University of Sri Lanka. He is a graduate of the Defence Services Command and Staff College, Sri Lanka.

== Notes ==
- "Commander of the Army: General Lasantha Rodrigo, RSP, ndu, psc, IG". Sri Lanka Army. Archived from the original on 31 July 2026.

Military offices
Preceded by Vikum Liyanage	Commander of the Army; 2024–2026	Succeeded by Nilantha Premaratne
