= Vijitha Ravipriya =

Sri Lankan general

Major General Vijitha Ravipriya was a general of the Sri Lanka Army. He was appointed Director General of Sri Lanka Customs in February 2020 following his retirement from the Sri Lanka Army. Having been commissioned as an artillery officer, Ravipriya has served as Commander Security Forces Headquarters - Kilinochchi; Director General of Training, Army Headquarters; General Officer Commanding, 57 Division; Director Media and Military Spokesman, Director of Personal Administration and Director of Plans. He was educated at Thurstan College.
