= Defence.lk =

- Website type: Online web portal
- Owner: Ministry of Defence (Sri Lanka)
- Website: www.defence.lk
- Launched: April 2006
- Current status: Online

Defence.lk is the official web portal of the Ministry of Defence of Sri Lanka. At the conclusion of the Sri Lankan Civil War it was the Sri Lanka's 7th most viewed web site, with an average daily hit rate of over 8.8 million in May, 2009. Traffic and popularity have fallen sharply since the end of the civil war - as of 28 March 2012 it was Sri Lanka's 647th most viewed web site.

When the Sri Lankan Armed Forces achieved their victory at Kilinochchi on 2 January 2009, the website received 13 million hits within a few hours, the highest number of hits ever received by a locally hosted website.

== Mission ==
An initiative of Defence Secretary Gotabaya Rajapaksa, the website was launched in April 2006 to provide up to date news and views related to national defence matters.

The mission statement that currently appears on the website is " Formulation and execution of strategies with regard to defence and safeguarding territorial integrity and sovereignty of Sri Lanka."
