= 57 Division (Sri Lanka) =

- Active: 2008–present
- Country: Sri Lanka
- Branch: Sri Lanka Army
- Type: Division (military)
- Part of: Security Forces Headquarters - Mullaitivu
- Headquarters: Kilinochchi
- Engagements: Sri Lankan Civil War, Battle of Kilinochchi 2008–09

Commanders
- Current commander: Major General R.P.S. Prasad RWP RSP USP
- Notable commanders: Major General Jagath Dias

The 57 Division is a division of the Sri Lanka Army. A principal offensive division it was deployed for combat operations in the Wanni region in 2009.

== Formation ==
With the start of Eelam War IV, a phase of the Sri Lankan Civil War, the Sri Lankan military launched an offensive to capture the Eastern Province from the LTTE. The Sri Lankan military had captured the Eastern Province from the LTTE by July 2007. Soon after this, the military's focus was shifted to the North, and a new offensive began to capture the Northern Province from the LTTE.

A new division named as the 57 Division had been created by the Sri Lanka Army on 26 February 2007. This was created as an offensive division, with the task of neutralising LTTE threats on civilian settlements in Vavuniya and Mannar. Three brigades comprised the 57 Division, named as 571, 572 and 573. The 571 Brigade was commanded by Colonel G.V. Ravipriya, while the 572 Brigade was commanded by Colonel Senerath Bandara. The 573 Brigade was commanded by Lieutenant Colonel Prathap Thillekeratne. Participating in the northern offensive, the 57 Division under the command of Major General Jagath Dias, Col GV Ravipriya commenced operations in March 2007. It was deployed to advance on Kilinochchi along the western flank of the Wanni region.

A new brigade named as the 574 Brigade was added to the 57 Division in October 2008, under the command of Lieutenant Colonel Senaka Wijesuriya. The command of the 572 Brigade was taken over by Lieutenant Colonel Dhammika Jayasundera during this time.

== Sri Lankan Civil War ==
The 57 Division was involved in the Vanni offensive from the beginning – March 2007 – right up to May 2009.

=== Operations ===
In late March 2008, the 57 Division was given the objective of capturing the Madhu church and surrounding areas by the Sinhala and Tamil new year in April. The 57 Division captured this area on 24 April 2008. After securing Madhu, Palampiddi became the next objective, which was captured on 17 May. After capturing the village of Mundumurippu in May and Periyamadhu in June, the 57 Division continued its advance into LTTE held territory and linked up with the 58 Division on 30 June 2008.

A new army division was created during the same time to hold the ground captured by the 57 Division. This new division, which was named the 61 Division, was given the task of holding the areas captured by the 57 Division up to Palampiddi, enabling the 57 Division to focus on the offensive.

=== Towns captured by 57 Division ===
| # | Area liberated | Date |
|---|---|---|
| 1 | Madhu church complex | 24 April 2008 |
| 2 | Palampiddi Town | 16 May 2008 |
| 3 | Mundumurippu Village | 23 May 2008 |
| 4 | Periyamadhu Village | 15 June 2008 |
| 5 | Naddankandal Village | 11 July 2008 |
| 6 | Kalvilan Village | 13 August 2008 |
| 7 | Thunukkai and Uilankulam Towns | 22 August 2008 |
| 8 | Mallavi Town | 2 September 2008 |
| 9 | Akkarayankulam tank bund | 29 October 2008 |
| 10 | Akkarayankulam built-up | 5 November 2008 |
| 11 | Kokavil Town | 1 December 2008 |
| 12 | Terumurikandy junction | 10 December 2008 |
| 13 | Kilinochchi Town | 2 January 2009 |
| 14 | Ramanathapuram | 7 January 2009 |
| 15 | Visuamadu Town | 28 January 2009 |
