= Operation Unceasing Waves =

Operation Unceasing Waves may refer to three operations by the Tamil Tigers against the Sri Lankan Army:

- Operation Unceasing Waves I - assault on the SLA base at Mullaitivu in July 1996; also known as the First Battle of Mullaitivu
- Operation Unceasing Waves II - assault on the SLA base at Kilinochchi in September 1998; also known as the First Battle of Kilinochchi
- Operation Unceasing Waves III - assault on multiple SLA bases including the massive garrison at Elephant Pass in April 2000
