= Kilinochchi Madhya Maha Vidyalayam =

Provincial school in Sri Lanka

Kilinochchi central collage
- கிளிநொச்சி மத்திய மகா வித்தியாலயம்
- කිලිනොච්චි මධ්‍ය මහා විද්‍යාලය

Location
- A9 Road, Aanathapuram; Kilinochchi, Kilinochchi District, Sri Lanka, Northern Province, 42400; Sri Lanka
- Coordinates: 9°22′52.10″N 80°24′32.50″E

Information
- School type: Public provincial 1AB
- Founded: 1927
- School district: Kilinochchi Education Zone
- Authority: Northern Provincial Council
- School number: 1101001
- Principal: Poologarajah Saviri
- Teaching staff: 59
- Grades: 1-13
- Gender: Mixed
- Age range: 5-18

Kilinochchi Madhya Maha Vidiyalaya, which is also known as Kilinochchi Central College (Tamil: கிளிநொச்சி மத்திய கல்லூரி, romanized: Kiḷinocci Mattiya Kallūri; Sinhala: කිලිනොච්චි මධ්‍ය මහා විද්‍යාලය) earlier is a provincial school in Kilinochchi, Sri Lanka. Kilinochchi Madhya Maha Vidiyalaya was promoted to a National School in 2013.

== Big Match ==
Kilinochchi Madhya Maha Vidiyala plays the annual Cricket encounter with Kilinochchi Hindu College is known as the "Battle of Northern Blues".

== See also ==
- List of schools in Northern Province, Sri Lanka
