= 66 Division (Sri Lanka) =

- 66 Division flag
- Active: 2009 – present
- Country: Sri Lanka
- Branch: Sri Lanka Army
- Type: Division (military)
- Part of: Security Forces Headquarters – Mullaitivu
- Garrison/HQ: Pooneryn, Northern Province

Commanders
- Current commander: Maj Gen DMAP Dissanayake

The 66 Division is a division of the Sri Lanka Army. Established on 1 January 2009, the division is based in Pooneryn in the Northern Province, Sri Lanka. The division was a part of Security Forces Headquarters – Kilinochchi but now the division is part of Security Forces Headquarters – Mullaitivu and has three brigades and seven battalions.

== Organisation ==
The division is organised as follows:

- 661 Brigade (based in Pooneryn, Northern Province)
  - 15th Volunteer Battalion, Vijayabahu Infantry Regiment
  - 5th Volunteer Battalion, Mechanized Infantry Regiment
- 662 Brigade (based in Paranthan, Northern Province)
  - 20th Battalion, Sri Lanka Light Infantry
  - 10th Battalion, Gajaba Regiment (based in Kiranchi, Northern Province)
  - 18th Volunteer Battalion, Gajaba Regiment (based in Paranthan, Northern Province)
- 663 Brigade (based in Kiranchi, Northern Province)
  - 5th Volunteer Battalion, Gajaba Regiment (based in Kiranchi, Northern Province)
  - 27th Battalion, Sri Lanka National Guard
