= Sooriyabandara =

Sooriyabandara is a surname. Notable people with the surname include:

- Pasindu Sooriyabandara (born 1999), Sri Lankan cricketer
- Saddha Mangala Sooriyabandara (born 1968), Sri Lankan journalist
- Samantha Sooriyabandara, Sri Lankan Army Major general and
- Srinath Sooriyabandara, Sri Lankan rugby union player
