= Eelanatham =

Sri Lankan Tamil language newspaper

- Type: Daily
- Political alignment: Tamil Nationalist
- Language: Tamil
- Headquarters: Kilinochchi, Sri Lanka

Eelanatham (Tamil: ஈழநாதம், romanized: īḻanātam) is a Tamil language newspaper. It is known for promoting a Tamil nationalist prospective and a pro-LTTE stance. The newspaper has been attacked several times, and a number of its staff have been murdered by paramilitary groups and other forces.
