= 58 Division (Sri Lanka) =

- Active: 2008–present
- Country: Sri Lanka
- Branch: Sri Lanka Army
- Type: Division (military)
- Size: 20,000+ troops
- Part of: I Corps
- Engagements: Sri Lankan Civil War

Commanders
- Current commander: Major General WTWG Ihalage

The 58 Division is a division of the Sri Lanka Army formed in 2008, prior to which it was known as Task Force 1 from 2007 to 2009. A principal offensive division, it is currently deployed for combat operations in the Wanni region. The Special Forces Brigade has been attached to the division.

== Current formation ==
- 58-1 Brigade
- 58-2 Brigade
- 58-3 Brigade

== Sri Lankan Civil War ==
=== Operations ===
The Division recaptured the strategically important Pooneryn salient and played a major role in the recapture of the Kilinochchi in the Battle of Kilinochchi and the strategically important Elephant Pass the Gateway to Jaffna.

On 15 January, 58 Division gained total control over Dharmapuram, in Kilinochchi District, a key LTTE stronghold located along the A-35 Paranthan – Mullaittivu main road. Troops cleared the area of LTTE fighters.

On 28 January, troops from the 58th Division gained control of Vishwamadu town, located south-east of Dharmapuram on the A-35 main road.

On 29 March to 5 April 2009 Battle of Aanandapuram which was a land battle fought between the 58 Division, 53 Division and Task Force 8 and the Liberation Tigers of Tamil Eelam (LTTE) for the control of the last stronghold held by the LTTE.

=== Towns captured by 58 Division ===
#	Area Liberated	Date
1	Adampan town	9 May 2008
2	Mullikkandal, Minnaniranchan and Marattikannaddi Villages	24 June 2008
3	"The Mannar Rice Bowl": Alankulama, Andankulama, Alakaddiveli, Parappakandal, Parappukadatan, Papamoddai, Odupallam, Neduvarampu, Kannaputtukulama and Vannakulama Villages	29 June 2008
4	Linked up with 57 Division – south west of Periyamadhu	30 June 2008
5	Vidattaltivu Town	16 July 2008
6	Illuppaikkadavai Town	2 August 2008
7	Vellankulam Town, Mulankavil and Pallavarayankaddu areas	12 August 2008
8	Nachchikudha	21 August 2008
9	Maniyankulama	16 October 2008
10	Vannerikkulama	20 October 2008
11	Nochchimodai	28 October 2008
12	Jeyapuram and Nachchikuda	29 October 2008
13	Kiranchi	10 November 2008
14	Devil's Point and Vallaipadu	13 November 2008
15	Pooneryn	15 November 2008
16	Sinna-Paranthan	23 December 2008
17	Nalanawakulam Village	26 December 2008
18	Paranthan	1 January 2009
19	Killinochchi town	2 January 2009
20	Murasumoddai	8 January 2009
21	Dharmapuram	15 January 2009
22	Visuamadu Town	28 January 2009
23	Thevipuram	20 February 2009
24	Iranapalai Junction	17 March 2009
25	Pachchapulmuddai	1 April 2009
26	Puthukkudiyiruppu	5 April 2009
