= Muhamalai Forward Defence Line =

Sri Lankan defence line during the Sri Lankan Civil War

During the Sri Lankan Civil War, the Muhamalai Forward Defence Line was the Army Defence Line separating the Sri Lankan Army and Liberation Tigers of Tamil Eelam (LTTE) militia in North Central Kilinochchi from South Central Jaffna. The distance between the first line of defences ranged from 200 to 600 meters. Sri Lankan soldiers captured the 1st Forward Defence Line (FDL) between Muhamalai and Kilali at around 05:00 on 20 November 2008, pushing the LTTE lines 800m southward.

== History ==
Although wider than the Nagarcoil Forward Defence Line, it was very difficult for either of the fighting forces to advance through enemy defence lines and attack the enemy bunkers, due to the topography. For several years the line was the most active front in the Sri Lankan Civil War, but throughout hundreds of battles the defence positions hardly moved either way. In almost all cases, the side trying to overrun enemy defence lines suffered heavy casualties. The Muhamalai FDL had strategic importance due to its location on the Kandy-Jaffna Highway. If the SLA took control of Muhamalai, they would obtain a crucial land supply route. The LTTE had around 3,000 militiamen in Muhamalai and Nagarcoil, and the SLA forces numbered several thousand. Elephant Pass, another strategic location, lay to the south of Muhamalai. Unlike the other FDLs north of Mannar (where large numbers of Eastern and Mannar Tamils were stationed) and Southern Vanni, LTTE cadres in these two FDLs consist mostly of Jaffna Tamils. For several years Muhamalai FDL was the most active FDL in the Sri Lankan Civil War, despite being static for the entire time, and a large proportion of the war's casualties occurred there.

== History and Operation Agni Keela ==
For the past seven years,(2000–2007) the SLA tried several times to break through the Kilali-Muhamalai-Nagarkovil defence line and reach Elephant Pass, the gateway to the Vanni, but every time it had to retreat, suffering heavy losses in men and material (especially armoured carriers and tanks). The geography of Muhamalai worked against the SLA but suited the well-entrenched LTTE. The battlefield lay in a narrow isthmus in between sections of the Jaffna Lagoon. The location allowed no room for manoeuvre, making the place a death trap, unsuitable for tanks, which led to the SLA losing a large number of tanks to anti-tank fire. The LTTE not only mined the area extensively, sometimes using the powerful Monster mine to blow up tanks, but also dug trenches and large pits, and camouflaged them so that troops, armour and vehicles would fall into them. The Tigers typically avoided man-to-man fighting in this narrow area so as not to get trapped themselves, but used long-distance weapons like mortars and artillery. Stories of battles in the Muhamalai sector followed a pattern: on 25 April 2001, the 52, 53 and 55 Divisions fought their way through to occupy two square kilometres of LTTE-held territory in the Kilali-Eluthumaduval sector, but had to retreat in disarray after a 72-hour-long battle, losing 300 to 500 men. The LTTE had allowed them to get into a cul-de-sac only to attack them from three sides.

== 2008 Offensive ==
Battle of Jaffna (2008)
- Part of the Sri Lankan civil war
Date	April 22, 2008
Location	Jaffna, Sri Lanka
Result	LTTE Defensive victory

Belligerents
Military of Sri Lanka	Liberation Tigers of Tamil Eelam

Commanders and leaders
Maj. Gen Kamal Gunaratne	Brigadier Theepan

Strength
53 Division: Air Mobile Brigade; 55 Division 40,000 soldiers	Charles Anthony Brigade Jeyanthan Brigade 3000 fighters

Casualties and losses
150+ killed 400+ wounded (LTTE claim)	25+ killed(LTTE claim)

On 21 April 2008, the SLA launched a major offensive towards Muhamalai FDL supported by tanks and artillery. The SLA overran the LTTE cadres' first line of defence, forcing them to withdraw to their second line of defence, but the LTTE forces engaged in a heavy mortar and RPG fire from their new positions towards the weakly defended former first line of defence, where SLA troops became trapped. Around 15 SLA soldiers and 52 LTTE militiamen died in the attack, according to Defencenet, and 176 SLA soldiers and 25 militiamen died according to the LTTE. The army claimed that their forward defence line was extended by 500 meters after the battle, but the Tamils refuted this claim and published pictures of dead soldiers lying in the bunkers in the first line of defence. As of 24 April 2008, the SLA has so far handed over six bodies of dead militiamen, and LTTE has handed over 28 soldiers' bodies to the Red Cross.

The focus of the conflict subsequently shifted from the Northern Defense Lines to other fronts, mainly the Mannar front, where the SLA successfully routed the LTTE, liberating extensive zones. As a result, the SLA adopted guerrilla tactics to deal with the LTTE presence in Jaffna, with extensive and successful use of sniper and hit and run tactics.
