= Operation Sath Jaya =

Military offensive by Sri Lanka

- Part of Sri Lankan Civil War
| Date | July to October 1996 |
| Location | Northern Province, Sri Lanka |
| Result | Sri Lankan Military victory |

Belligerents
| Sri Lanka Army Sri Lanka Navy | Liberation Tigers of Tamil Eelam |

Commanders and leaders
| General Rohan Daluwatte | Velupillai Prabhakaran |

Units involved
| Sri Lanka Armed Forces; Sri Lanka Army; Vijayabahu Infantry Regiment; 4th Battalion of the Vijayabahu Infantry Regiment; Commando Regiment; 1st Commando Regiment; 2nd Commando Regiment; Sinha Regiment; Special Forces Regiment; Light Infantry; Sri Lanka Navy; Sri Lanka Police; Special Task Force | Liberation Tigers of Tamil Eelam; Jeyanthan Brigade |

Casualties and losses
| 500 killed | 60 killed |

Operation Sath Jaya (Sinhalese: Operation True Victory) was the military offensive carried out by the Sri Lankan Armed Forces in July to September 1996 to recapture the town of Kilinochchi from the LTTE. The army launched the offensive from its base in Elephant Pass in June in response to Battle of Mullaitivu in which the 25 Brigade of the army was overrun at its base in the town of Mullaitivu resulting in the deaths of over 1,500 Sri Lankan Armed Forces personal. Units of the Sri Lanka Army fought its way south from Elephant Pass along the A9 highway to Kilinochchi which it was able to recapture in September. The LTTE recaptured Kilinochchi in late September 1998.

== See also ==
- List of Sri Lankan Civil War battles
