= Nagarcoil Forward Defence Line =

The Nagarcoil Forward Defence Line was an Army Forward Defence Line (FDL) that separated Sri Lankan Army and LTTE militia in Northeastern Kilinochchi - Southeastern Jaffna border.

The unique topography of the area was believed to make it almost impossible for either of the two sides to push for a military victory in that area. The FDL comprised a very narrow isthmus connecting Jaffna peninsula to rest of Sri Lanka. It is only a few hundred meters wide and on the both sides heavily fortified and mined as well as abundant in booby traps. Compared to Muhamalai FDL, the Nagar Kovil FDL was much narrower and so it was extremely difficult to overrun enemy bunker lines. The Manalkadu desert is located North of the FDL, while the small hamlet of Kudrappu is located to the South. For the past several years, along with the Muhamalai FDL, Nagarcoil FDL was the most active front in the Sri Lankan Civil War.
