= Tharmapuram =

Tharmapuram, or Dharmapuram, is a town in Kilinochchi District, Northern Province, Sri Lanka. It is about 13 km east to the town of Kilinochchi.

Tharmapuram is situated in Kandavalai (or Kandawalai) DS Division. There are two GN divisions which bear the name of Tharmapuram, i.e. Tharmapuram West and Tharmapuram East.

In 2008, the number of internally displaced persons (IDPs) in Kilinochchi District had been increasing. Many IDPs were reported to have moved to Tharmapuram from Semmankunru and Kiranchchi areas.

By early October 2008, several institutions of the Liberation Tigers of Tamil Eelam were relocated to Tharmapuram from Kilinochichi. Hence Tharmapuram had served shortly as the administrative center of the Liberation Tigers of Tamil Eelam.

Kilinochichi was captured by Sri Lankan government on January 2, 2009. Shortly afterwards, Tharmapuram was also captured by Sri Lankan government on January 15, 2009.
