= I Corps (Sri Lanka) =

1 Corps
- 1 Corps Logo
- Active: 2021-Present
- Country: Sri Lanka
- Branch: Sri Lanka Army
- Type: Corps
- Size: 50,000+ troops
- Part of: Army Headquarters (Sri Lanka)
- Garrison/HQ: Kilinochchi

Commanders
- Current commander: Maj. Gen. Crishanthe Gnanratne

1 Corps ("First Corps") is a field corps formation of the Sri Lanka Army. The Corps is headquartered at Kilinochchi in Northern Province. It was raised on 17 October 2021. It was formed with the amalgamation of the Reserve Strike Force, special forces units and the former Security Forces Headquarters - Kilinochchi (SFHQ-KLN) creating the Army's First Strike Corps.

== Units ==
- Reserve Strike Force
  - 53 Division, based at Inamaluwa, Dambulla
    - Air Mobile Brigade
    - 532 Brigade
    - 533 Brigade
  - 58 Division
    - 581 Brigade
    - 582 Brigade
    - 583 Brigade
- Special Operations Force
    - Commando Brigade
      - 1 Commando
      - 2 Commando
      - 3 Commando
      - 4 Commando
    - Special Forces Brigade
      - 1 Special Forces
      - 2 Special Forces
      - 3 Special Forces
      - 4 Special Forces
- Affiliated Units
  - 8th Medium Regiment, Sri Lanka Artillery
  - B Sqd, 5th Reconnaissance Regiment, Sri Lanka Armoured Corps
  - 9 Sri Lanka Signals Corps
- Combat Support Services
  - Forward Maintenance Area (FMA), Kilinochchi
  - Logistic Battalions
    - 5 Sri Lanka Corps of Military Police
    - 6 Sri Lanka Army Ordnance Corps
    - 7 Sri Lanka Army Service Corps
    - 7 Sri Lanka Electrical and Mechanical Engineers
    - 11 Engineer Services Regiment
    - Army Base Hospital, Kilinochchi
