= Kilinochchi Hindu College =

School in Northern Province, Sri Lanka

- கிளிநொச்சி இந்துக் கல்லூரி

Location
- Kilinochchi, Kilinochchi District, Northern Province; Sri Lanka; 9°23′49.30″N 80°22′41.20″E

Information
- School type: Public provincial 1AB
- Founded: 28 September 1952
- School district: Kilinochchi Education Zone
- Authority: Northern Provincial Council
- School number: 1101002
- Teaching staff: 38
- Grades: 1-13
- Gender: Mixed
- Age range: 5-18

Kilinochchi Hindu College (Tamil: கிளிநொச்சி இந்துக் கல்லூரி Kiḷinocci Intuk Kallūri) is a provincial school in Kilinochchi, Sri Lanka.

== See also ==
- List of schools in Northern Province, Sri Lanka
