= Jagath Dias =

Sri Lankan general

Major General Jagath Dias ජගත් ඩයස් WWV, RWP, RSP, VSV, USP
- Born: 26 December 1960 (age 65); Colombo, Sri Lanka
- Military career
- Allegiance: Sri Lanka
- Branch: Sri Lanka Army
- Service years: 1980–2015
- Rank: Major General
- Unit: Gajaba Regiment
- Commands: Chief of Staff of the Army,, General Officer Commanding, 56 Division; General Officer Commanding, 57 Division, Commander of Special Forces Brigade,
- Conflicts: Eelam War I, Eelam War II, Eelam War III, Eelam War IV, Sri Lankan Civil War
- Awards: Weera Wickrama Vibhushanaya; Rana Wickrama Padakkama; Rana Sura Padakkama; Uttama Seva Padakkama
- Other work: Deputy Chief of Mission to the Sri Lanka Embassy in Berlin

Major General Nanayakkara Agarage Jagath Chulanaga Dias, WWV, RWP, RSP, VSV, USP (born December 26, 1960) is a Sri Lankan general, who served as the Chief of Staff of the Sri Lanka Army. He was the General Officer Commanding, 57 Division and 56 Division. He was the Sri Lankan Deputy Ambassador to Germany, Switzerland and the Vatican.

== Education ==
Educated at Ananda College, he is a graduate of the National Defence College, India.

== Military career ==
Dias enlisted in the army after completing his schooling on 11 August 1980 undergoing officer training at the Sri Lanka Military Academy at Diyatalawa; and commissioned to the 1 Vijayabahu Infantry Regiment as a Second Lieutenant on 27 February 1982. Afterwards he received an Inter Regimental transfer to Gajaba Regiment and went on to serve as the Commanding Officer of the 10th Gajaba Battalion and later served the Officiating Commandant at the Regimental Headquarters of the Gajaba Regiment. He was promoted to the ranks of captain in 1986, major in 1994, lieutenant colonel in 1995 and had undertaken the Young Officers' Course, Senior Command Course, MCC Course, CIMIC Course and the Senior Crisis Management Seminar.

In 2000 he was promoted to colonel and was appointed Officiating Commander of Special Forces Brigade and Officiating Commander, 516 Brigade till 2001. In 2001 he was appointed Officiating Inspector Infantry, Army Headquarters till 2003. He was promoted to brigadier in 2005 and major general on 18 February 2008.

During his military career he held many appointments. The include; Adjutant General (2012–2014), Deputy Chief of Mission to the Sri Lanka Embassy in Berlin (2009–2011), General Officer Commanding 57 Division (2007–2009), General Officer Commanding 56 Division (2006–2007), Commander 233 Brigade (2005–2006), Commandant, Infantry Training Centre, Officiating Commander for 534 Brigade (2003–2004), Officiating Inspector Infantry, Army Headquarters (2001–2003), Officiating Commander, 516 Brigade (2000–2001), Coordinating Officer Ariyalai, Officiating Commander, 551 Brigade, Commander 553 Brigade, Officiating Colonel GS, Directorate of Operations, Army Headquarters, Officiating Commandant Gajaba Regiment Regimental Headquarters, Commanding Officer, 10 Gajaba Regiment and many other appointments.

Foreign assignments reported by the military include: Pakistan, Qatar, Oman, US, India, Czech Republic, Turkey, China, Russian Federation, Australia, Germany & South Korea.

If a nation forgets its past it is certainly not focused to face the future

— Jagath Dias

Year	Position Held
2000	Officiating Commander of Special Forces Brigade
2000-2001	Officiating Commander, 516 Brigade
2001-2003	Officiating Inspector Infantry, Army Headquarters
2003-2004	Commandant, Infantry Training Center, Officiating Commander, 534 Brigade
2005-2006	Commander 233 Brigade (note: this is during the final war in the East)
2006-2007	General Officer Commanding 56 Division
2007 Feb	57 Division created (consisting of 571, 572, 573 Brigades and then in October 2008 the 574 Brigade was added)
2007-2009	Appointed General Officer Commanding 57 Division
2009-2011	Deputy Chief of Mission to the Sri Lanka Embassy in Berlin (Also accredited to Switzerland and the Vatican)
2012–2014	Adjutant General for the Sri Lankan Army
2014 Jan	Security Force Commander Mullaitivu
2015-2016	46th Chief of Staff of the Army

General Jagath Dias led the 57 Division; he did a tremendous task because it was his responsibility to regain Kilinochchi. He was there from the very beginning of the Humanitarian Operations till the very last minute.

— Gotabhaya Rajapaksa

== Family ==
He is married to Sharanki and they have two sons and a daughter.

== Awards and decorations ==

Weera Wickrama Vibhushanaya	Rana Wickrama Padakkama	Rana Sura Padakkama	Vishista Seva Vibhushanaya
Uttama Seva Padakkama	Desha Putra Sammanaya	Eastern Humanitarian Operations Medal	Northern Humanitarian Operations Medal
Purna Bhumi Padakkama	North and East Operations Medal	Vadamarachchi Operation Medal	Riviresa Campaign Services Medal
50th Independence Anniversary Commemoration Medal	Sri Lanka Army 50th Anniversary Medal		Sri Lanka Armed Services Long Service Medal
