= Iranamadu =

Iranamadu: இரணமடு; ඉරණමඩුව
- Village
- Location within Northern Province Location within Sri Lanka
- Country: Sri Lanka
- Province: Northern
- District: Kilinochchi
- DS Division: Karachchi

Iranamadu or Iranaimadu (Tamil: இரணைமடு, romanized: Iraṇaimaṭu, lit. 'Double-bund'; Sinhala: ඉරණමඩුව, romanized: Iraṇamaḍuva) is a city in Kilinochchi District, Sri Lanka. It includes a Iranamadu Tank that provides water to the paddy fields in the region. The Sri Lankan Army claimed in early 2009 that they had captured an Air Tiger airstrip in the area.

== See also ==
- Kilinochchi – Sri Lankan District Located In Northern Province Near Jaffna
