= Security Forces Headquarters – Kilinochchi =

- Active: 29 June 2009 – 16 October 2021
- Allegiance: Sri Lanka
- Branch: Sri Lanka Army
- Size: 3 divisions
- Garrison/HQ: Iranamadu Camp, Kilinochchi
- Anniversaries: 31 October
- Engagements: Sri Lankan Civil War
- Website: army.lk/sfkilinochchi

Commanders
- Current commander: Maj. Gen. Ajith Kariyakarawana

Insignia
- Flag

Security Forces Headquarters – Kilinochchi (SFHQ-KLN) was a regional command of the Sri Lanka Army, that was responsible for the operational deployment and command all army units stationed in Kilinochchi District, this includes several divisions and the independent brigades. This a new command established to maintain control over newly recaptured area. It was one of the five Security Forces Headquarters and the General Officer Commanding it is one of the most senior officers in the army, the post is designated as Commander Security Forces Headquarters - Kilinochchi. The SFHQ-KLN was based at Kilinochchi. It was disbanded in October 2021, having been replaced with the newly formed I Corps.

== Composition ==
- 57 Division, operating in the Kilinochchi District
- 65 Div, operating in the Kilinochchi District
- 66 Div, operating in the Kilinochchi District
- Task Force 3, operating in the Kilinochchi District
- Affiliated Units
- FMA Units
