= Battle of Kilinochchi (1998) =

Battle during the Sri Lankan civil war

Battle of Kilinochchi Operation Unceasing Waves II
- Part of the Sri Lankan civil war
Date	September 27, 1998 – September 29, 1998
Location	Kilinochchi, Sri Lanka
Result	Tamil Tiger victory
Territorial changes	LTTE captured Kilinochchi

Belligerents
Military of Sri Lanka	Liberation Tigers of Tamil Eelam

Commanders and leaders
(Sri Lanka) Chandrika Kumaratunga	Velupillai Prabhakaran

Strength
3,500+ troops: 543 Brigade: 10th Battalion, Sri Lanka Sinha Regiment; 4th Battalion, Sri Lanka Sinha Regiment; 6th Battalion, Gemunu Watch; 7th Battalion, Gemunu Watch; 9th Battalion, Gemunu Watch; 7th Battalion, Sri Lanka Light Infantry; Sri Lanka Armoured Corps; Fire support: Sri Lanka Artillery; Sri Lanka Air Force	Troops Number's Unknown: Intelligence Attack Team; Special Reconnaissance Unit; Mayooran Sniper Unit; Land Leopard Force; Jeyanthan Regiment; Charles Antony Special Regiment; Anparasi Regiment; Malathy Regiment; Sothiya Regiment; Santhosam Regiment; Manalaaru Regiment; Victor Anti-Armor Regiment; Fire Support: Kittu Artillery Brigade; Ratha Anti-Aircraft Team; Auxiliary Force: Special Border Force

Casualties and losses
Sept 27–29: 1,250+ killed and ~2,000 wounded (LTTE & UNP claims); 857 killed, 936 wounded,171 missing (SLA claims); 3 Tanks & 1 APC destroyed; By Sept 30: 1,900 killed (UNP claims)	520 killed (SLA claims) 403 killed (LTTE claim)

The Battle of Kilinochchi (codenamed Operation Unceasing Waves II by the Tamil Tigers) occurred in September 1998 over the control of the city of Kilinochchi in Sri Lanka (geographical coordinates 9.383333°N 80.4°E). The battle was fought between the Sri Lankan Army (SLA) and the Liberation Tigers of Tamil Eelam (LTTE).

== Prelude ==
On 25 July, 1996 Mullaitivu base fell under LTTE control. Immediately on the 26th of July 1996 the Sri-Lankan Army launched Operation Sath Jaya with the intention of capturing Kilinochchi After 70 days of fighting, the SLA captured Kilinochchi on 22 September, 1996. This caused several thousand civilians to be displaced.

== The battle ==
On September 27, 1998, the LTTE launched Operation Unceasing Waves II, an offensive to recapture the town of Kilinochchi. They assaulted the Sri Lankan Army's Kilinochchi complex, ten miles south of the Elephant Pass base. The following day, the Tigers captured a distance of five miles on the Jaffna-Vavuniya road. Elephant Pass and Paranthan military bases, further north, were also attacked to block reinforcements. Fighting continued until September 29 1998, when Kilinochchi finally fell to the Tigers.

== Casualties ==
The Sri Lankan Army claimed that up to 520 Tigers and 443 SLA soldiers were killed in the close-quarters and hand-to-hand fighting over two days. On the same day that Kilinochchi fell to the Tigers the city of Mankulam, which was rebel-held, fell to the SLA. But the Sri Lankan opposition party leader Ranil Wickremasinghe challenged this claim in the parliament on 10 October 1998 by providing a casualty figure of over 1250 dead and 2000+ wounded between 27 and 29 September and 1900 SLA troops had died by September 30 when the fighting had eased. But the government nor the SL military had not denied this claim. Mr. Wickremasinghe's sources were said to be from SLA HQ and Military Intelligence.

LTTE handed over 684 bodies, which were in good condition, of the more than 1000 dead-bodies of SLA soldiers recovered from the battlefield, according to the LTTE sources in London, to SLA through ICRC in two phases. In addition to these 262 dead-bodies were recovered by the Sri Lankan military. In Colombo, hospital officials said an additional 53 soldiers have died in hospitals. A total of 989 dead bodies have been received by the Sri Lankan military.

In a heavily guarded area, representatives of various regiments spent over 20 hours identifying dead-bodies. Those who were personally identified were handed over to the next of kin whilst those who were only identified as soldiers were cremated at a close ceremony with full military honours.

== Tamil People reaction ==
In the north, Tamils have donated blood and helped the LTTE care for wounded soldiers. People gathered in large numbers in the area to welcome the Liberation Tigers who took part in the operation with soft drinks and coconut water.

== Weapons lost by SLA ==
The LTTE claimed to have captured 2 130 mm Artillery pieces, 1 Buffel and many military vehicles.

The SL opposition party at that time, the UNP, claimed that 4 artillery pieces, 2 T-55 tanks, 8 Buffel, and 75 assorted jeeps, trucks and tractors were lost by SLA to LTTE, though it was not clear if these referred items were destroyed or captured by the Tigers. He also added that the SLA had also lost approximately 2,500 small arms, over 2 million rounds of small arms ammunition and over 1,000 artillery rounds.

== See also ==
- 2008–2009 Battle of Kilinochchi
- Operation Unceasing Waves I
- Operation Unceasing Waves III
- List of Sri Lankan Civil War battles
