= Iranamadu Tank =

- இரணைமடு குளம் (Tamil); ඉරණමඩු වැව (Sinhala)
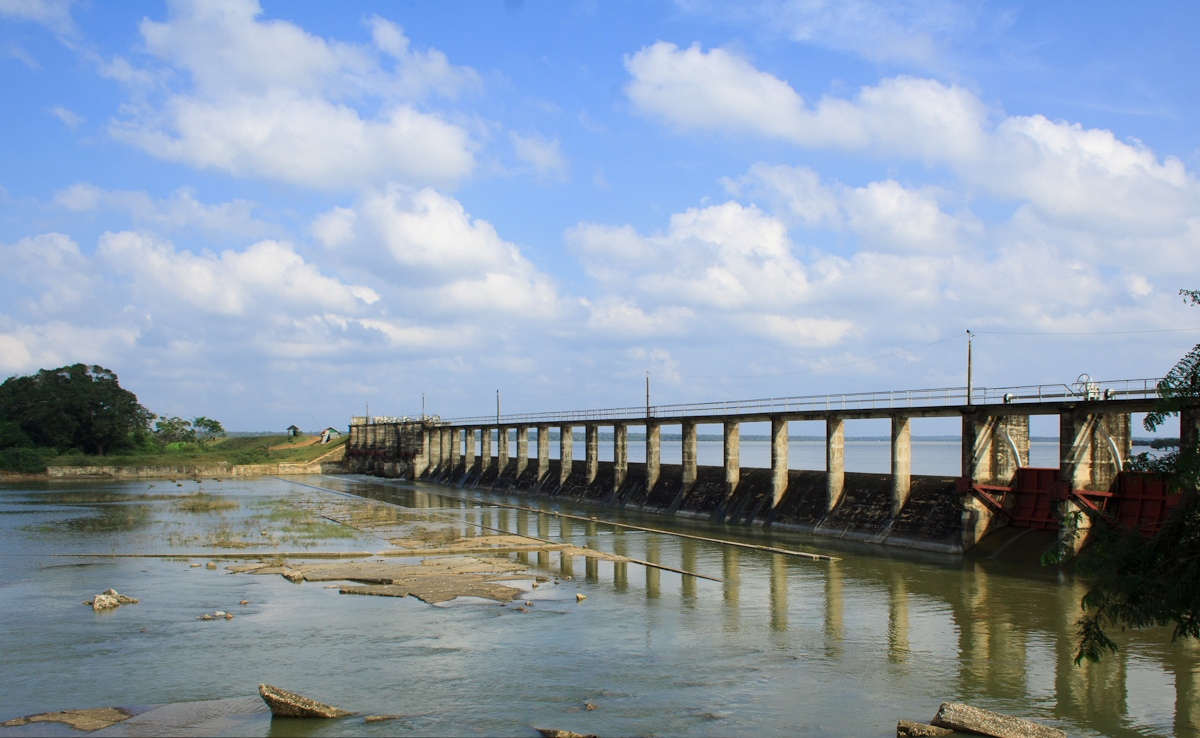

- Location within Northern Province
- Location: Northern Province
- Coordinates: 09°18′50″N 80°26′50″E
- Type: Reservoir
- River sources: Kanakarayan Aru
- Catchment area: 227 sq mi (588 km^{2})
- Managing agency: Department of Irrigation, Northern Provincial Council
- Built: 1921
- Max. length: 6 mi (10 km)
- Max. width: 1 mi (2 km)
- Max. depth: 34 ft (10 m)
- Water volume: 106,500 acre⋅ft (131,365,816 m^{3})
- Surface elevation: 101 ft (31 m)

Iranamadu Tank (Tamil: இரணைமடு குளம் Iraṇaimaṭu Kuḷam; Sinhala: ඉරණමඩු වැව) is an irrigation tank in northern Sri Lanka, approximately 3 mi (5 km) south east of Kilinochchi.

== History ==
In 1902 the Director of Irrigation H. T. S. Ward came up with proposals for building a new irrigation tank on the Kanakarayan Aru in northern Ceylon. Work in the tank, which had a catchment area of 227 sq mi (588 km^{2}) and was to hold 26 ft (8 m) (Note: Another source states that the initial depth was 22 ft (7 m).) of water, began in July 1902 (Note: Another source states construction started in 1906.) but was delayed by the World War I. Construction was completed in 1921 (Note: Other sources state construction was completed in 1922.) and the tank was filled and spilling in November 1921. The tank was created by joining up two low lying swamps of the Kanakarayan Aru. Construction was carried out manually and the labourers were housed in a new colony - present day Kilinochchi. The tank cost Rs. 194,000 to construct. The tank's name was derived from the Tamil words for two (iranai) and pond (madu).

In the 1940s a severe drought in the Jaffna islands resulted in large numbers of people migrating to the Kilinochchi area where they were given free land to farm near the Iranamadu tank. In 1951 (Note: Another source states that the depth was increased to 30 ft (9 m) in 1954.) the tank bund was raised to hold 30 ft (9 m) of water, increasing storage capacity to 71,000 acre⋅ft (87,577,210 m^{3}). An additional sluice was built on the right bank and the tank was extended onto lands on both banks. The bund was raised to 32 ft (10 m) in 1954 to give a storage capacity of 82,000 acre⋅ft (101,145,511 m^{3}).

By the late 1960s the tank had a water spread area of 5,750 acres (2,327 ha). The bund was 9,850 ft (3,002 m) long. There was a controlled overflow spill on the left bank. The left bank sluice was 5 ft by 4 ft whilst the right bank sluice was 4 ft by 2 ft 8 in. The tank was capable of irrigating 18,844 acres (7,626 ha) of land. The bund was raised to 34 ft (10 m) in 1975 (Note: Another source states that the depth was increased in 1977.) to give a storage capacity of 106,500 acre⋅ft (131,365,816 m^{3}).

Concerns were raised about the integrity of the bund during the monsoon rains of 1983. An investigation by K. Vigneswaran, deputy director of Irrigation, in early 1984 found that the bund was too weak to hold water higher than 32 ft (10 m) and so Vigneswaran ordered that water levels not exceed that amount.

The tank was 6 mi (10 km) long, 1 mi (2 km) wide and 34 ft (10 m) in 2012. It was capable of irrigating 20,882 acres (8,451 ha) via 20 mi (32 km) of channels. By 2014 the tank was capable of irrigating 21,985 acres (8,897 ha).

== Jaffna and Kilinochchi Water Supply and Sanitation Project ==
Jaffna Peninsula, which has a population of nearly 600,000, has no perennial rivers and is heavily reliant on groundwater. Unregulated water extraction for industrial, agricultural and domestic use has resulted in acute water scarcity. The water is also polluted due to the absence of a sewerage system and seawater intrusion caused by indiscriminate limestone quarrying. In the 1960s Deputy Director of Irrigation of S. Arumugam developed the River for Jaffna project (known as the Arumugam plan), which involved diverting the freshwater discharged by the Kanakarayan Aru into the heart of the Jaffna peninsula via the Vadamarachchi Lagoon. Whilst parts of the projects were completed in the 1960s, the crucial Mulliyan channel linking Chundikkulam Lagoon with Vadamarachchi Lagoon wasn't built. In 1983 the Sri Lankan government approved the completion of the project but the outbreak of the Sri Lankan Civil War put an end to the plans.

In 2006 the Sri Lankan government developed a new plan to supply water to Jaffna peninsula, the Jaffna and Kilinochchi Water Supply and Sanitation Project, which involved drawing water from Iranamadu Tank and transferring via pipeline to the peninsula. However, to ensure that farmers in Kilinochchi District continued to receive adequate supplies of water for irrigation, the tank bund would be repaired and raised by 2 feet to store and extract an additional 27,000m^{3} of water a day. A new raw water intake would be constructed near the tank's left bank main channel sluice. The raw water would then flow, under the influence of gravity, from the tank to Paranthan via a new 12 km 800mm diameter ductile iron pipe located alongside the existing left bank irrigation channel. From Paranthan the raw water would flow, under the influence of gravity, to Pallai via a new 20.5 km 600mm diameter high-density polyethylene (HDPE) pipe located alongside the A9 highway. At Pallai the raw water would be treated at a new water treatment plant before being pumped, via 45 km 600mm diameter ductile iron treated water main running alongside existing roads, to 17 new and 11 refurbished elevated water towers on the peninsula, and ground sumps at Kaddudai and Araliturai. The water towers will supply water, via 520 km 63-300mm diameter unplasticized polyvinyl chloride (uPVC)/medium-density polyethylene (MDPE) pipes, to Chavakachcheri, Jaffna, Kodikamam, Kopay, Navatkuli and Pallai. The ground sump at Kaddudai will pump water, via transmission mains, to Karaitivu and Velanaitivu. The ground sump at Araliturai on Velanaitivu will then pump water, via transmission mains, onto Pungudutivu, Mandativu, Nainativu, Analativu and Eluvaitivu.

The whole project, including sewerage and sanitation improvement in Jaffna, is expected to cost $164.04 million (Rs 17,880 million) of which $90 million will come from an Asian Development Bank loan, $40 million from a French Development Agency loan and the remaining $34.04 million from the Sri Lankan government. The project is expected to be completed in February 2017 and result in 60,000 new water connections benefiting 300,000 people and 20,000 mains sewer connections benefiting 80,000 people.

== North Central Province Canal Project ==
In 1950s and 1960s the Ceylonese government, with the assistance of the United Nations Development Programme and Food and Agriculture Organization, developed the Mahaweli Master Plan to use the waters of the Mahaweli River basin to irrigate Dry Zone land in northern and eastern Ceylon, and generate electricity. The 30-year plan was to cost Rs. 6,700 million and was divided into three phases. Phase 1 (Polgolla Diversion) was constructed in the 1970s. Following the 1977 parliamentary election the new government introduced the Accelerated Mahaweli Project which shortened the period from 30 years to 5/6 years but increased the cost from Rs. 6,700 million to Rs. 15,000 million. Phase 2 (Victoria-Minipe Diversion) was completed in the 1980s but phase 3 (Moragahakanda Project) was abandoned due to water scarcity and the outbreak of the Sri Lankan Civil War. The Moragahakanda Project had originally intended to connect the Mahaweli basin to the Kanakarayan Aru via a new canal - the North Central Province Canal.

A modified Moragahakanda Project commenced in January 2007 with the construction of Moragahakanda Reservoir and Kalu Ganga Reservoir. The Moragahakanda Reservoir was financed by a $558 million loan from the China Development Bank and the Kalu Ganga Reservoir was finance by loans from Japan International Cooperation Agency ($109 million) Saudi Fund for Development ($46 million) Kuwait Fund for Arab Economic Development ($37 million) and OPEC Fund for International Development ($16 million).

The North Central Province Canal Project (NCPCP) was launched in 2015. Phase 1 of the NCPCP includes the construction of the Kalu Ganga–Moragahakanda Transfer Canal between Kalu Ganga Reservoir and Moragahakanda Reservoir and construction of the Upper Elahera Canal connecting Moragahakanda Reservoir to existing reservoirs (Eruwewa, Huruluwewa, Mahakanadarawa and Manankattiya). Phase 1 is expected to cost $675 million of which $453 million will come from an Asian Development Bank loan, $108 million from the Sri Lankan government and the remaining $114 million from other financiers. Phase 1 is expected to be completed by the end of 2024. Phase 2 of the NCPCP includes the construction of the North Central Province Canal between Manankattiya to Chemamadu Kulam on the Kanakarayan Aru near Omanthai. Phase 2 is expected to cost Rs. 130 billion and be completed by 2029. (Note: Another source shows Phase 2 of the NCPCP being split into two - Phase 2 (2024-27) and Phase 3 (2028–2032).)
