= Palampiddi =

Palampiddy
- Town
- Location within Northern Province
- Coordinates: 8°55′0″N 80°12′0″E
- Country: Sri Lanka
- Province: Northern
- District: Mannar
- DS Division: Madhu

Palampiddi is a town in Mannar District, Sri Lanka. The popular Madhu Church is located close to this town. It is located about 224 km (139 mi) from the largest city Colombo.
