= Samantha Sooriyabandara =

Sri Lankan general

Major General Samantha Sooriyabandara RSP
- Born: Sri Lanka
- Died: 21 August 2012; Australia
- Military career
- Allegiance: Sri Lanka
- Branch: Sri Lanka Army
- Rank: Major General
- Unit: Commando Regiment
- Commands: General Officer Commanding 53 Division.
- Conflicts: Sri Lankan Civil War
- Awards: Rana Sura Padakkama; Uttama Seva Padakkama
- Other work: Defence Attaché in the Sri Lanka Embassy in Washington D.C

Major General Samantha Sooriyabandara RSP, USP was a Sri Lankan Army general and diplomat who commanded the 53 Division. He also served as the Defence Attaché in the Sri Lanka Embassy in Washington D.C.

== Early life and education ==
Sooriyabandara was educated at Nalanda College Colombo. He was a senior cadet in the school cadet core. Sooriyabandara's father was an officer in the Army, and was the first recruit soldier of the Sri Lanka Army after the English departed, with the Army registration number of No. 0001.

== Military career ==
Sooriyabandara was an expert parachutist attached to the Sri Lanka Army Commando Regiment as a Commando.

During Operation Jayasikurui, the helicopter in which Samantha was traveling was shot down by the LTTE. The helicopter was destroyed and all its passengers and crew, except Soriyabandara died. Tamil fishermen helped save his life and in gratitude, he gifted his gold chain to them.

Sooriyabandara was the Commander of the 53 Division (Sri Lanka) regiment during the final phase of Sri Lankan civil war. Earlier he was in charge of the personal security of the Commander of the Sri Lanka Army, Sarath Fonseka.

He was also an active member of Sri Lanka ex-service and Police Association Australia Inc.
