= Paranthan =

Paranthan பரந்தன் පරන්තන්
- Town
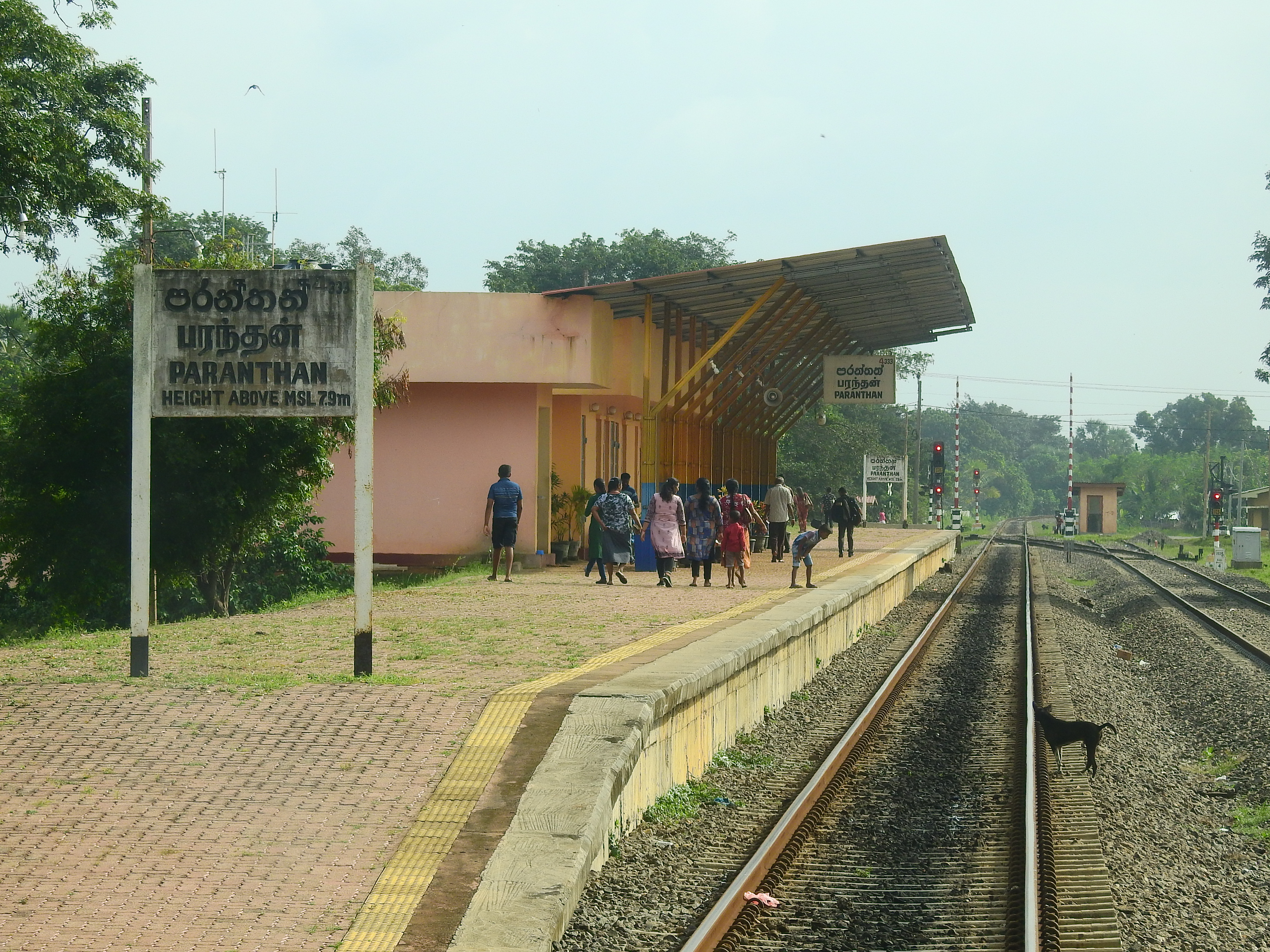
- Paranthan Railway Station

- Location within Northern Province
- Coordinates: 9°26′0″N 80°24′0″E
- Country: Sri Lanka
- Province: Northern
- District: Kilinochchi
- DS Division: Kandawalai

Paranthan is a town in Kilinochchi District, Sri Lanka. It is located about 5 km from district capital Kilinochchi.

== History ==
=== Creation (1936) ===
The city of Paranthan was established in 1936 as part of a colonization project that sought to ease overpopulation and unemployment in Jaffna.

=== Civil War ===
The town was often a battleground during the Sri Lankan Civil War, due to its strategic position along the A-9 Highway. The town was captured by the LTTE during Operation Unceasing Waves III, and would remain in their hands until the town was recaptured by the 58th Division of the Sri Lankan Army during the closing stages of the war on January 1, 2009. It is currently occupied by the I Corps, which is based in the nearby town of Kilinochchi.

== Economy ==
The town was the home of the Paranthan Chemical Factory, which served as the main source of employment and economic activity in the town. Due to the civil war, the factory halted its production activities, and instead imported chemicals to serve local industries, leaving the factory to rust. However, moves have recently been undertaken by the Ministry of Industries to continue chemical production within the factory.

== See also ==
- Kilinochchi
- Elephant Pass
