= Kalvilan =

Kalvilan කල්විලන්
- Town
- Location within Northern Province
- Coordinates: 9°09′0″N 80°13′6″E
- Country: Sri Lanka
- Province: Northern
- District: Mullaitivu

Kalvilan is a town located in the Mullaitivu District in the Northern Province of Sri Lanka. It is approximately 63 km (39 mi) away from the Northern Province's capital Jaffna and approximately 249 km (155 mi) away from Colombo.
