= Shrine of Our Lady of Madhu =

Roman Catholic shrine in Mannar, Sri Lanka

Coordinates: 8°51′18″N 80°12′10″E

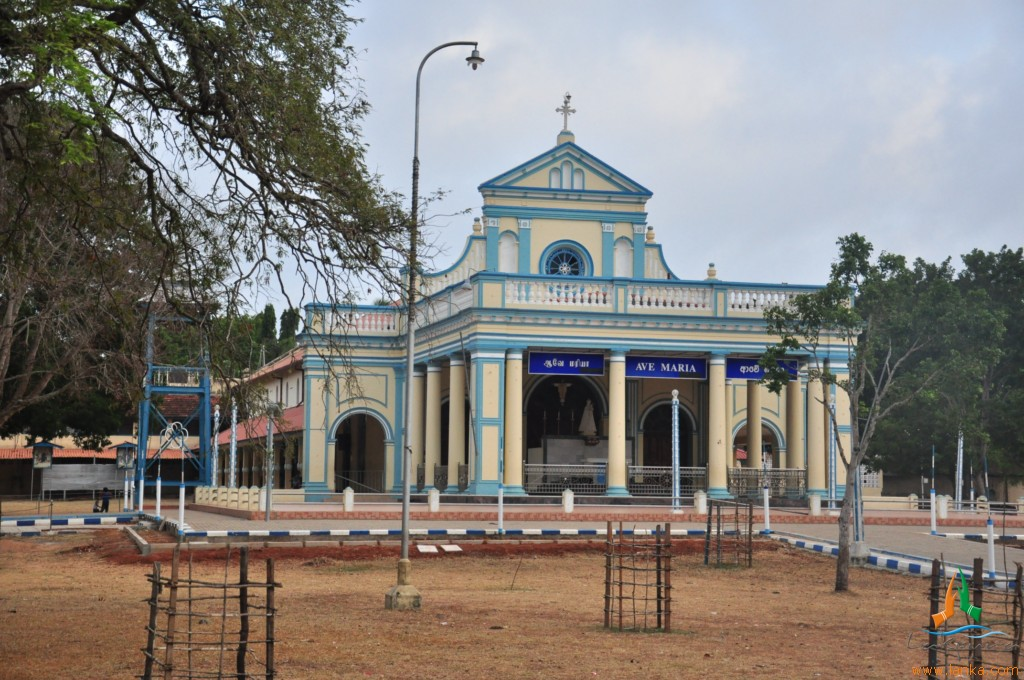

Religion
- Affiliation: Roman Catholic
- Rite: Latin Rite
- Status: Active

Location
- Location: Mannar district, Sri Lanka
- Interactive map of Shrine of Our Lady of Madhu

Architecture
- Type: Church with shrine before it
- Style: Baroque Revival

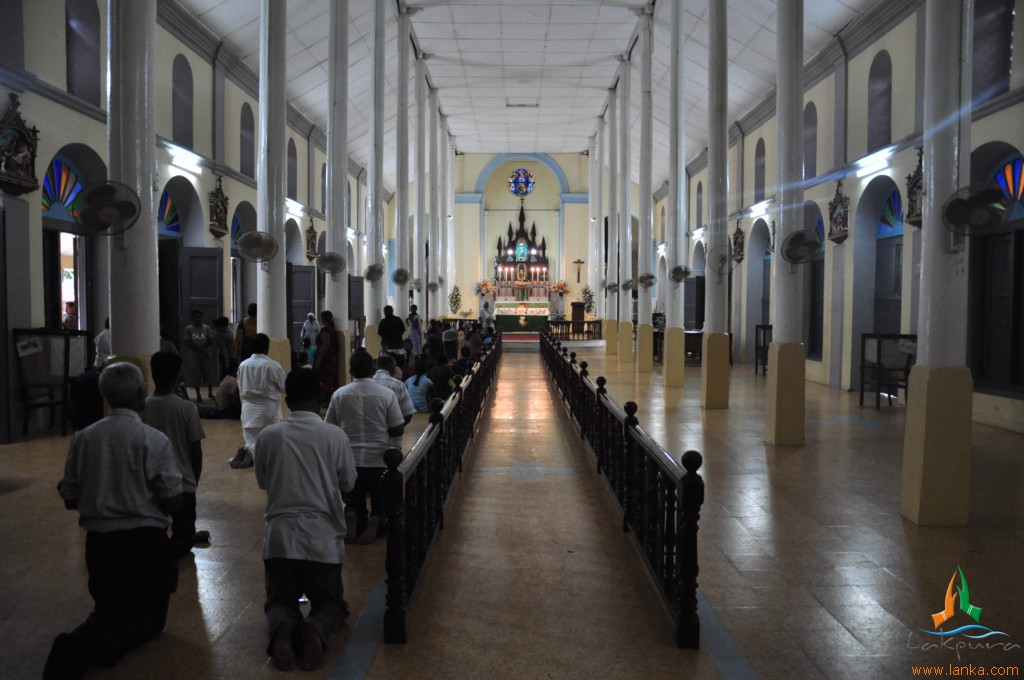

The Shrine of Our Lady of Madhu is a Roman Catholic Marian shrine in Mannar district of Sri Lanka. With a history of more than 400 years, the shrine acts as a center of pilgrimage and worship for Sri Lankan Catholics. The site is considered as the holiest Catholic shrine in the island and is a well known place of devotion for both Tamil and Sinhalese Catholics. The church has been a symbol of unity not just between Tamils and Sinhalese but also between people of different religions, including Buddhists, Hindus and Protestants.

Pope Benedict XV granted the image a pontifical decree of coronation on 7 April 1921 via the Prefect of the Sacred Congregation for the Propagation of the Faith, Cardinal Willem Marinus van Rossum. The rite of coronation was executed on 2 July 1924.

Attendance for the August festival at times almost reached one million people before the outbreak of the Sri Lankan Civil War. Situated in the heart of the conflict zone, pilgrimage to this shrine was dramatically affected by the civil war with the presence of refugee camps around the shrine complex. It was shelled a number of times.

== History ==
=== Background ===
Christianity in Sri Lanka is not well known before the 16th century although some local traditions claim that Saint Thomas the Apostle was active on the island. Portuguese missionaries from India, especially under the authority of Saint Francis Xavier, introduced Roman Catholicism to the Kingdom of Jaffna in northern Sri Lanka. The newly converted Christians were persecuted the Dutch. During this time the Catholics regrouped to form a church a few miles north in Manthai, installing a statue of Our Lady of Good Health in a shrine.

=== The shrine in Madhu ===
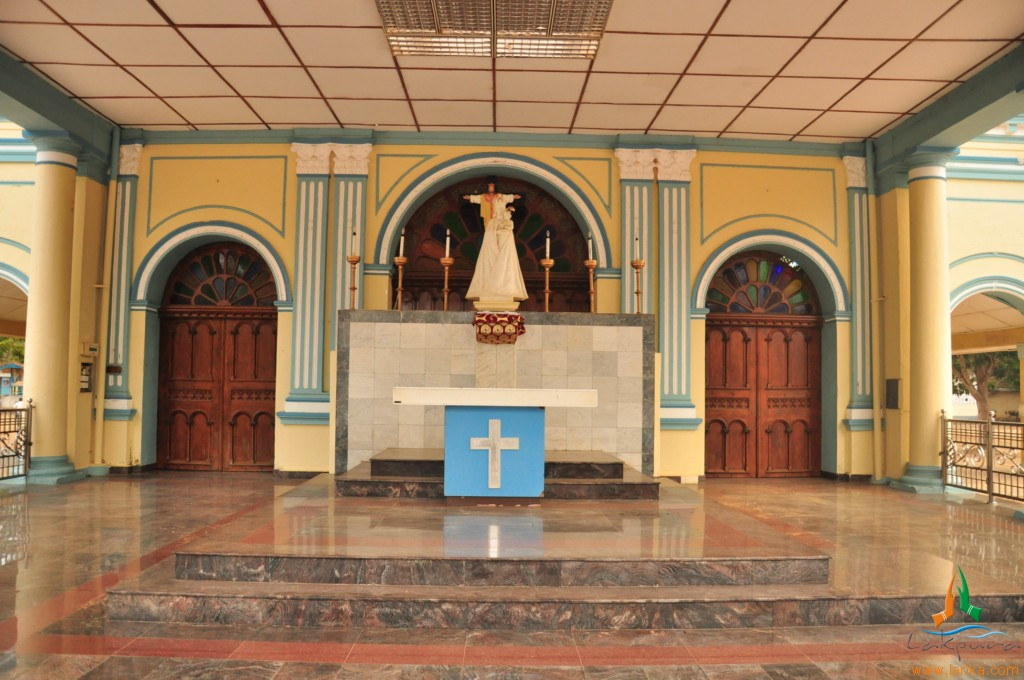

The Dutch invasion in 1670 and the ensuing persecution of the Catholic Church led to 20 Catholic families fleeing from Manthai, along with the statue of Mary in that church to the safer locale of Madhu. About the same time another 700 Catholics migrated from the Jaffna peninsula into Wanni forests. When these two communities met in Madhu, they installed a new shrine with the statue.

=== Expansions ===
With the revival of the Catholic faith by missionaries such as Joseph Vaz, Oratorian priests expanded the small shrine in the late 17th century. With the arrival of the British to the island, anti-Catholic persecution ceased, but the number of Catholics remained small with just 50,000 members in 1796. In spite of such a small community, the shrine at Madhu began attracting pilgrims from all over the country. The stifling of Jesuit authority which had been established in South Asia in 1773 eventually led to the suppression of the Society of Jesus in Madhu by 1834. The building of the new church was initiated by Bishop Bonjean in 1872 and his successors built a facade, a spacious presbytery, a restful chapel of the Blessed Sacrament and a grotto of Our Lady of Lourdes.

== Pontifical coronation ==
In 1920, Bishop of Jaffna, André Jules Brault sought Pope Benedict XV's sanction for the canonical coronation of the venerated image. Bishop Brault as well as the clergy and laity had petitioned the Holy See through the Cardinal Willem Marinus van Rossum, the Prefect of the Congregation for the Evangelization of Peoples. Cardinal Van Rossum personally presented the request to the Pope, who granted it in his audience of 7 April 1921. On 2 July 1924, the statue was officially crowned.

== Consecration of the church ==
The church was consecrated in 1944 during World War II. In preparation for the consecration ceremony, a marble altar replaced the old wooden structure and the whole sanctuary was covered with white and blue marble. In spite of travel restrictions and difficulty finding transportation, more than 30,000 people came to the jungle shrine.

== Church amidst civil war ==
=== Background ===
The civil war on the island-nation of Sri Lanka lasted thirty years. Since 1983, there was on-and-off civil war, predominantly between the government and the Liberation Tigers of Tamil Eelam (LTTE, also known as the Tamil Tigers), a separatist militant organization who fought to establish an independent state named Tamil Eelam in the north and east of the island. It is estimated that more than 68,000 people were killed since 1983.

=== Refugee camps ===
The shrine has housed thousands of refugees since 1990. In the autumn of 1999, more than 10,000 refugees took shelter in the Madhu area, which was seen as a demilitarised zone.

=== Madhu church shelling ===
On November 20, 1999, the area was shelled, killing 44 people and injuring more than 60; each side blamed the other. Catholic bishops called for the Madhu area to be a demilitarised zone with guaranteed security for pilgrims and the 15,000 refugees taking shelter. When the violence escalated, the civilians sheltered in the premises had to flee further north; the statue itself had to be moved because of repeated shelling.

== See also ==
- Roman Catholicism in Sri Lanka
