= 53 Division (Sri Lanka) =

Elite division of the Sri Lanka Army

- Active: 1995 - Present
- Country: Sri Lanka
- Allegiance: Sri Lanka
- Branch: Sri Lanka Army
- Type: Infantry
- Size: Division ~ 20,000+ troops
- Part of: I Corps
- Headquarters: Inamaluwa, Dambulla
- Engagements: Sri Lankan Civil War

The 53 Division is an elite combined infantry division of the Sri Lanka Army. Trained and formed in 1996 under the leadership of US military officers, the unit was used as a principal offensive division during the War, having been deployed for combat operations in the Jaffna Peninsula, and was under the command of Security Forces Headquarters - Jaffna. The brigades of the 53 Division are also trained by the US Special Forces, which have been closely involved with its development and training since 1997. The 53 division consists of the Airmobile Brigade, a Mechanised Infantry Brigade and a Special Forces Brigade. At present, it is headquartered at Inamaluwa, Dambulla and serves as one of two infantry divisions in the Reserve Strike Force (RSF) under the direct command of the I Corps capable of acting as a rapid reaction force (RRF).

== Current formation ==
- Air Mobile Brigade
- 53-2 Brigade
- 53-3 Brigade

== Sri Lankan Civil War ==
=== Towns captured by 53 Division ===
#	Area captured	Date
1	Puthukkudiyirippu Hospital	12 March 2009
2	Pachchapulmuddai	1 April 2009
3	Puthukkudiyiruppu	5 April 2009

== Notable commanders ==
- Major General Janaka Perera
- Major General Kamal Gunaratne
- Major General Samantha Sooriyabandara
