= Kilinochchi =

Sri Lankan District Located In Northern Province Near Jaffna

Kilinochchi கிளிநொச்சி කිලිනොච්චිය
- Town
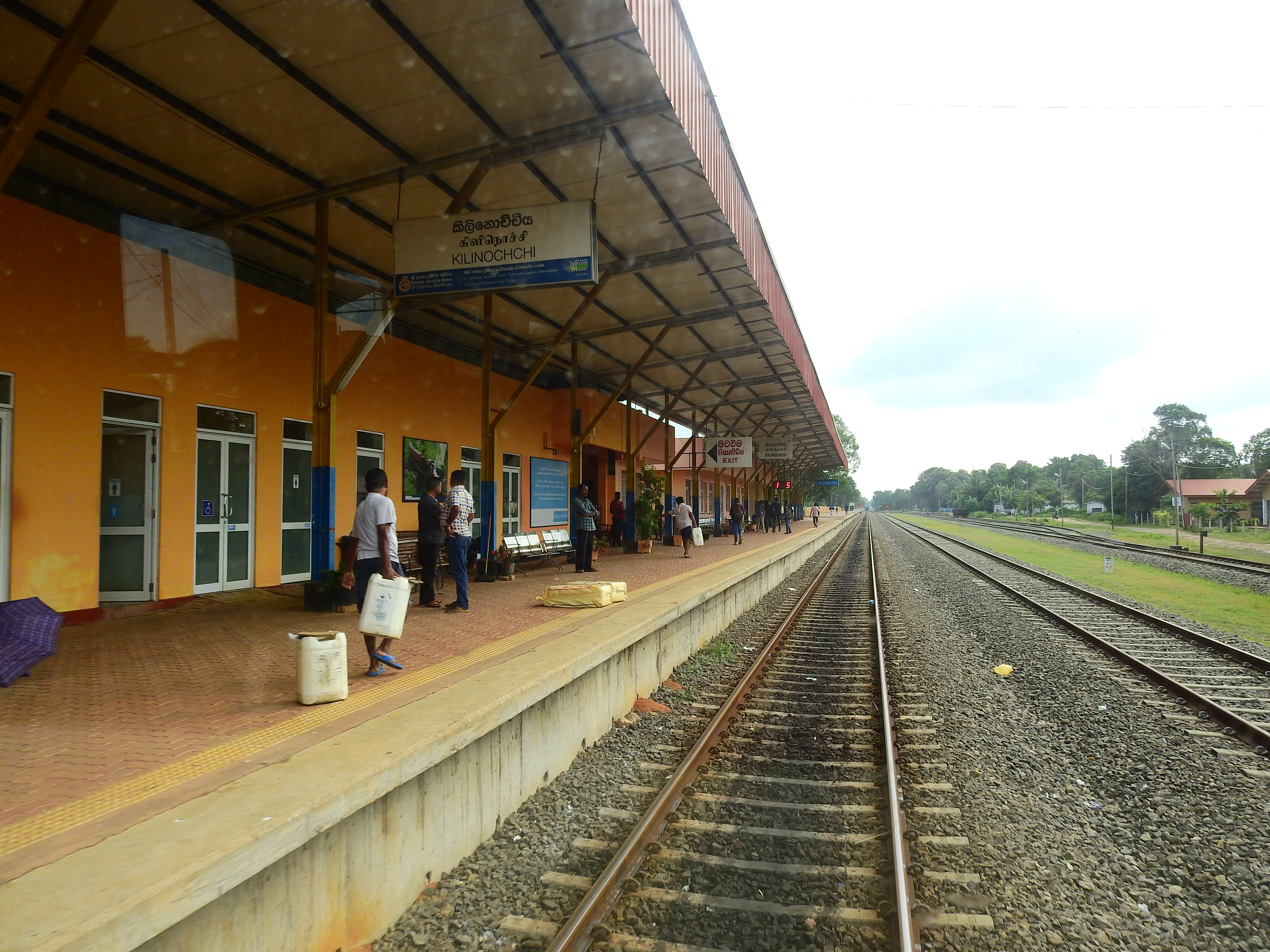
- Kilinochchi Railway Station

- Location within Northern Province
- Coordinates: 9°23′0″N 80°24′31″E
- Country: Sri Lanka
- Province: Northern
- District: Kilinochchi
- DS Division: Karachchi
- Time zone: UTC+5:30 (Sri Lanka Standard Time Zone)

Kilinochchi (Tamil: கிளிநொச்சி, romanized: Kiḷinocci; Sinhala: කිලිනොච්චිය, romanized: Kilinŏcciya) is the main town of Kilinochchi District, Northern Province of Sri Lanka. Kilinochchi is situated at the A9 road some 100 km (62 mi) south-east of Jaffna. It was the administrative center and de facto capital of the LTTE (Tamil Tigers) until 2 January 2009, when troops of the Sri Lankan Army recaptured the city.

== History ==
=== Creation (1936) ===
The Kilinochchi town was established in 1936 as part of a colonization project that sought to ease overpopulation and unemployment in Jaffna.

Kilinochchi is still part of the Jaffna electoral division and it was separated from the Jaffna District in the 1980s as a new district. Most of the people living in this district are farmers and related to agricultural work. Most of the people migrated from Jaffna in the 1930s to acquire government grants for land in the region and to engage in paddy (rice) cultivation. During the 1970s, a large number of immigrants from the hill country, predominantly Indian Tamils, settled in the town. Much of the population immigrated overseas (Europe, US, Canada, Australia, etc.) during the Civil War (1990-2009). The population has begun to rise after the end of the war.

=== Sri Lankan Civil War ===
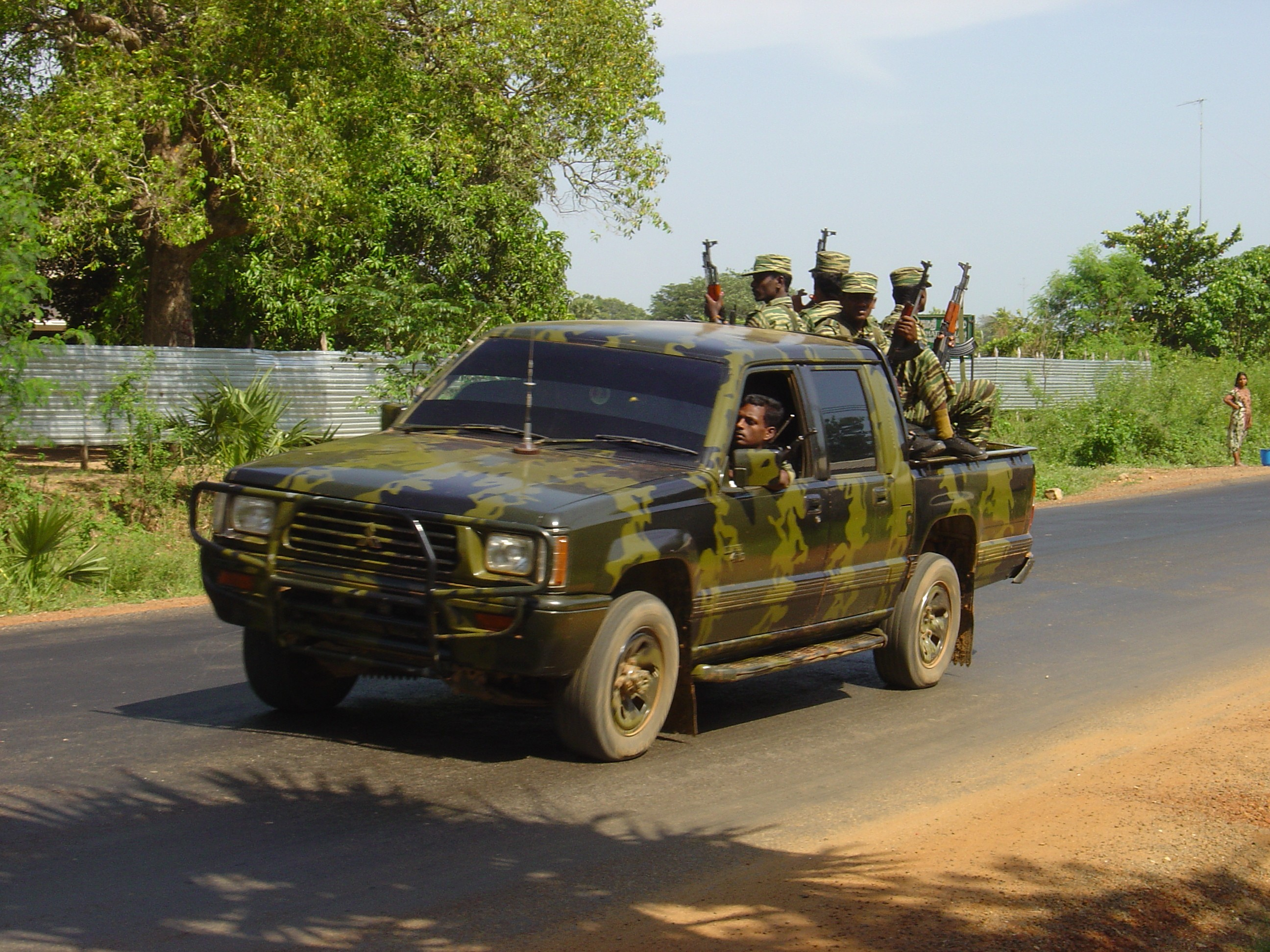
LTTE troops in Kilinochchi, 2004

The LTTE first took hold of the town in 1990 when the Army withdrew its garrisons from Kilinochchi. Then the area was retaken by the Army during Operation Sathjaya in September 1996. The town again fell into the LTTE's control in September 1998 who held their administrative hub there until retreating during the Battle of Kilinochchi on 2 January 2009. Security Forces Headquarters – Kilinochchi was established on June 29, 2009.

== Demography ==
Most people living in Kilinochchi are Sri Lankan Tamils and Indian Tamils.

== Economy ==
Kilinochchi is one of the major agrarian areas on the island since pre-historic times. Iranamadu Tank, Kanakampikai Kulam (Pond), and Kilinochchi Kulam are the major irrigation source for paddy and other crops. However, the economy of the town has suffered in recent times due to the economic crisis, which has resulted in a lack of fertilizer and fuel, reducing crop yields.

== Transport ==
Kilinochchi is connected to the Sri Lanka Railways Northern Line via its railway station. The A-9 Highway passes through the town, giving it direct connection with the major cities of Jaffna and Kandy.

== Media ==
Kilinochchi is served with all Jaffna- and Colombo-based newspapers. The Jaffna-based Uthayan has a regional office in Kilinochchi.

There have been discussions of not distributing Jaffna-based newspapers in the Vanni area, especially Uthayan. Uthayan is highly critical of inappropriate land acquisition in the Jaffna peninsula and the Vanni region by the Sri Lankan Military and Government.

== Education ==
This district has one university faculty and several Government Colleges such as Faculty of Agriculture of University of Jaffna, Kilinochchi Central College, Hindu College, Uruthirapuram Maha Vidyalayam school, and the Vaddakkachchi Maha Vidyalayam school.
