= List of Hindu temples in Sri Lanka =

The following is a list of Tamil Hindu temples in Sri Lanka.

== Central Province ==
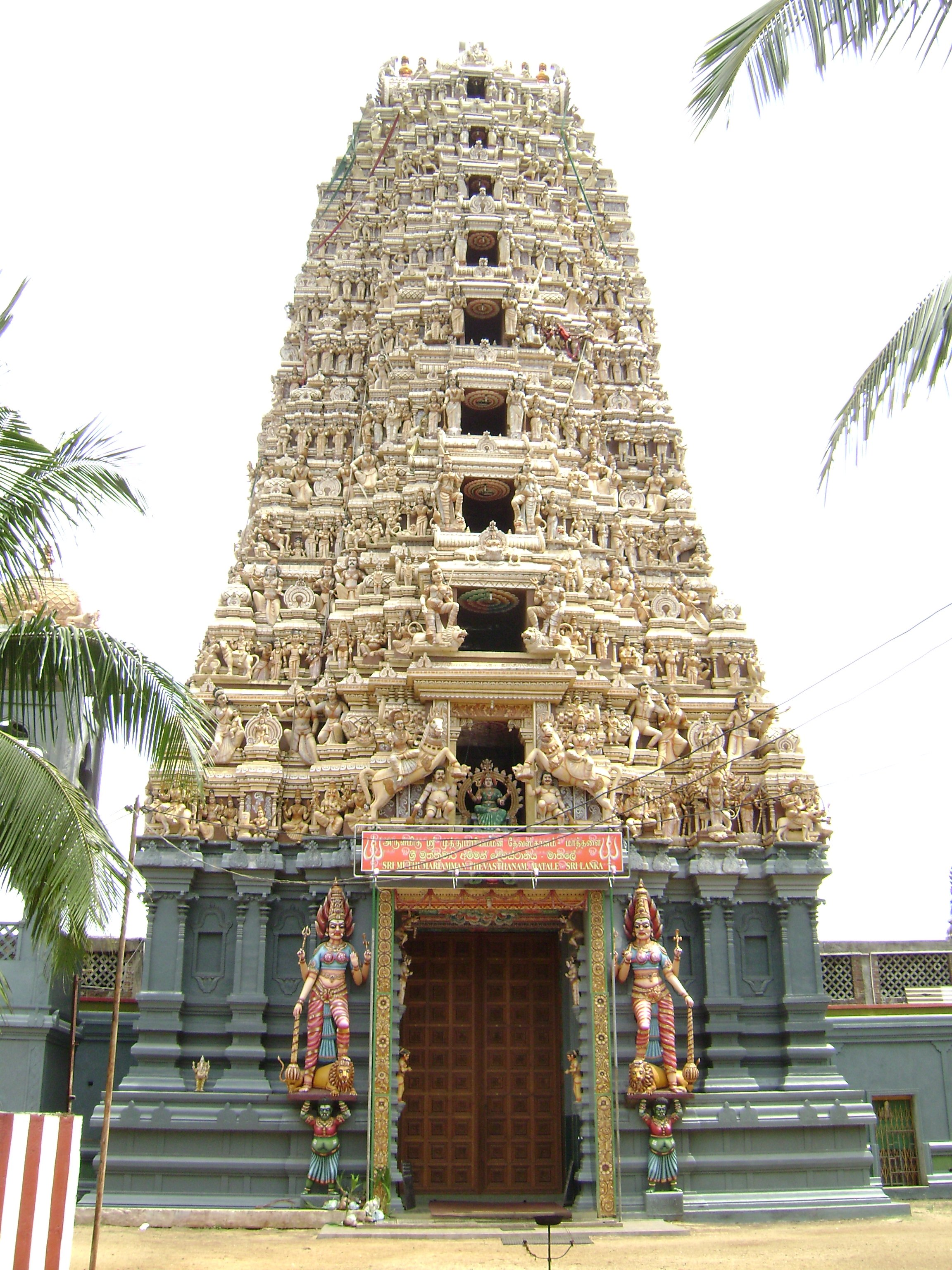
Sri Muthumariamman Temple, Matale

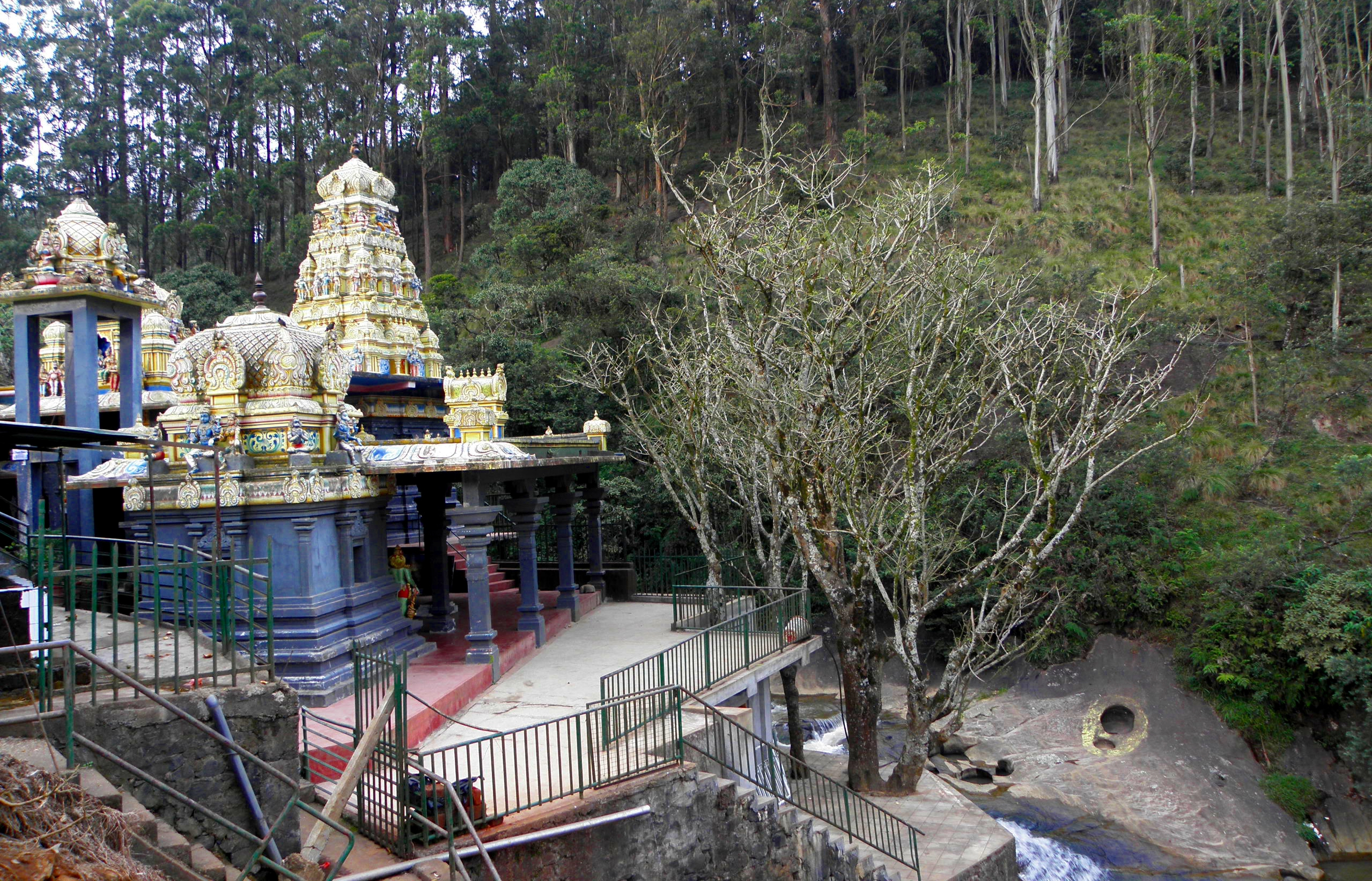
Seetha Amman Temple, Nuwara Eliya

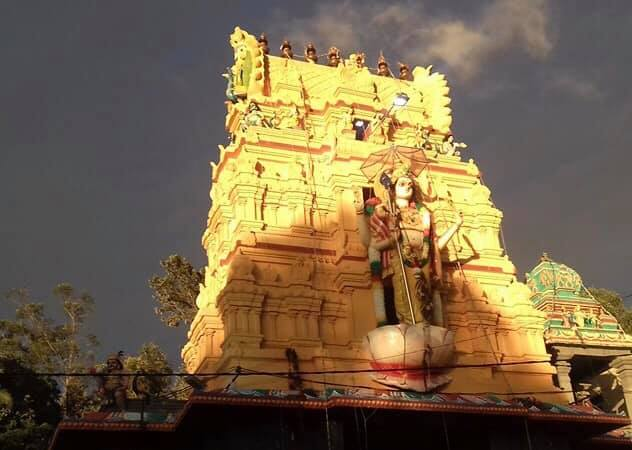
Sri Kathirvelayuda Swami Kovil Pussellawa

=== Kandy District ===
- Sri muthumari Amman thirukkovil, ayojanagama, Kandy
- Sri Muthumari Amman Kovil, Mahaiyawa, Kandy
- Kurinchi Kumaran Temple, Peradeniya
- Sri Devi Karumari Amman Temple, Nillambe, Peradeniya, Kandy
- Sri Muthumari Amman Temple, Galaha
- Sri Selva Vinayagar Temple, Katukele, Kandy
- Sri Kathiresan Kovil, Pussellawa
- Sri Selva Vinayagar Temple, Paradeka
- Sri Kathirvelayuda Swami Kovil, Gampola
- Sri Muthumari Amman Devasthanam, Gampola

=== Matale District ===
- Sri Mariamman Temple, Warakamure
- Sri Muthumariamman Temple, Matale
- Sri Muthumariamman Temple, Maligatenna, Yatawatta
- Sri Selva Vinayagar Temple, Rattota
- Sri Sithy Vinayagar Temple, Matale
- Sri Sivasubramania Swami Temple, Ukuwela
- Sri Muthumaariamman Temple, Bambaragalla

=== Nuwara Eliya District ===
- Kethara Gowreeswarar Temple, Maskeliya
- Sri Muthumariyamman Temple, Lanka estate, Maskeliya
- Seetha Amman Temple, Nuwara Eliya
- Siva Temple, Kuliwata, Hatton
- Sri Lankatheeswarar Temple, Nuwara Eliya
- Sri Navanathar Siththar Sivan Temple, Kaddapula
- Sri Ayyappan Temple, Kandapola
- Sri manilla pillayar kovil, Hatton
- Sri muththumariyamman kovil, Hatton
- Sri kathirvelayuthar swami kovil, Ragala

== Eastern Province ==
=== Ampara District ===
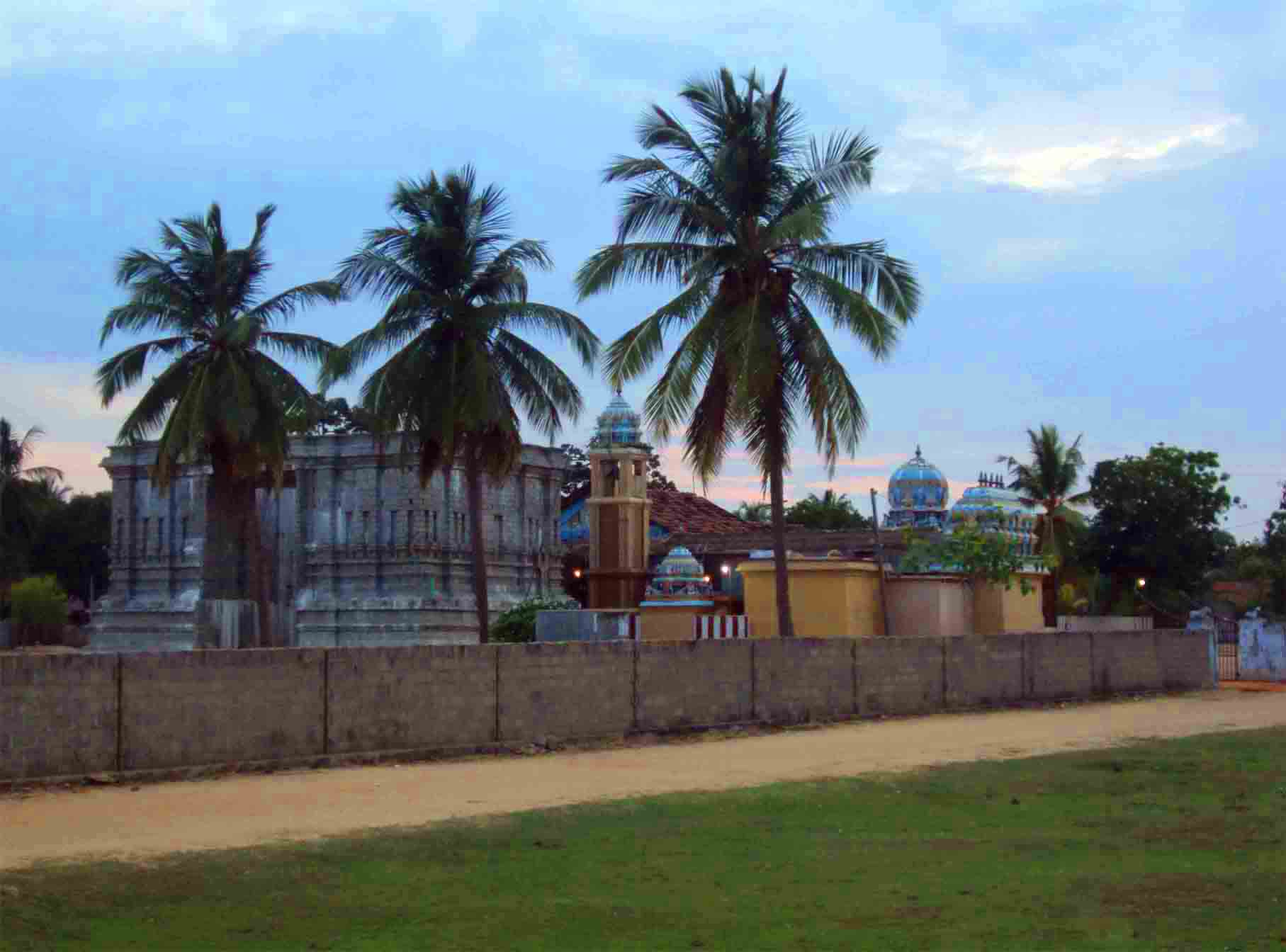
Thirukkovil Sithira Velayutha Swami Temple

- Chenaikudiruppu Sri Muthumariyamman Temple
- Meenaktchiyamman Temple, Senkatpaddai, Ninthavur
- Nageswarar Temple, Kamdickalai, Savalakkadai
- Paddinakar Kannaki Amman Alayam
- Palugamam Sivan Temple, Kalmunai
- Panankadu Pasupadeswarar Temple
- Pasupatheswarar Temple, Panankadu, Akkaraipattu
- Sivan Temple, Natpiddimuani, Kalmunai
- Sivan Temple, Vedduvaikkal, Karaitivu
- Sivan Temple, Vinayagapuram, Thirukkovil
- Sivapuram, Kalmunai
- Sri Ampalathady Temple, Kiddankyveethy, Natpiddimuani
- Sri Lingeswarar, Annamalai, Navithanveli
- Sri Naguleswarar Temple, Natpiddymunai, Kalmunai
- Sri Santhaneswarar Temple, Kalmunai
- Sri Vilavadi Vinayakar Alayam, Malwattai
- Thalaiyadi Sivan Temple, Thambiluvil
- Thambiluvil Kannaki Amman Temple, Thambiluvil
- Thambiluvil Sivan Temple, Thambiluvil
- Thambiluvil Sri Sivalinga Pillayar Temple, Thambiluvil
- Thirukkovil Sithira Velayutha Swami Temple, Thambiluvil
- Ukanthamalai Murugan Temple, Okanda
- Sri Siththi vinayagar temple (Central camp)

=== Batticaloa District ===
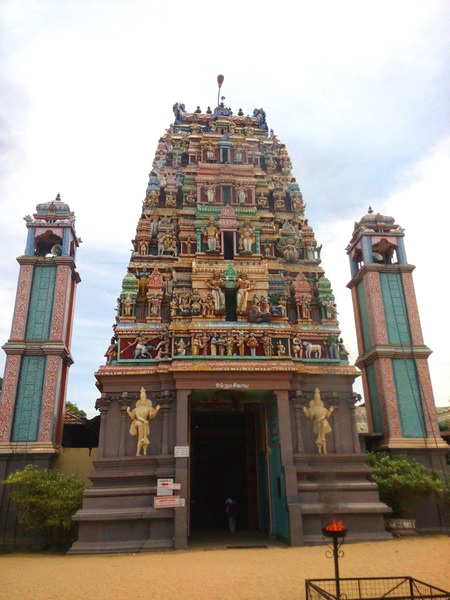
Kokkadichcholai Sivan Temple

- Alakandy Pillai Sivan Temple, Valaichchenai
- Anaipanthy Sri Sithy Vigneswarar Thevalayam, Pulliyanthivu, Batticaloa
- Easwarar Temple, Kaluthawalai
- Kokkadicholai Thaanthonreeswarar Temple, Kokkadicholai
- Mamangeshvarar, Batticaloa
- Murugan Temple, Dandamalai
- Muttulingaswamy Temple, Dandamalai
- Sivan Temple, Cheddypalayam
- Sivan Temple, Kattankudy
- Sivan Temple, Kitulvewa, Chiththandy
- Sivan Temple, Navatkudah
- Sivan Temple, Pavatkodichchenai, Unnichchai
- Sivan Temple, Pethalai, Valaichchenai, Eravur
- Sivan Temple, Vivekananthapuram, Thiruppalukamam
- Sivaneswarar Temple, Selvanagar East
- Sivapuram Sivan Temple, Eruvil East
- Sri Kaneshvarar Temple, Valaichchenai
- Sri Lakshminaarayanar Temple, Arulnesapuram, Kadukkamunai, Kokkaddicholai
- Sri Pathirakali Amman Temple, Periya Urani, Batticaloa
- Sri Sithira Velayutha Swamy Koyil, Pulliyantivu, Batticaloa
- Sri Thackayageswarar Temple, Batticaloa
- Sri Thackayageswarar Temple, Manmunai
- Thanthonriswarar, Kokkatticholai
- Throupathayamman Temple, Pulliyantivu, Batticaloa
- Sri Siththi Vinayagar Temple, Puthunagar, Batticaloa

=== Trincomalee District ===
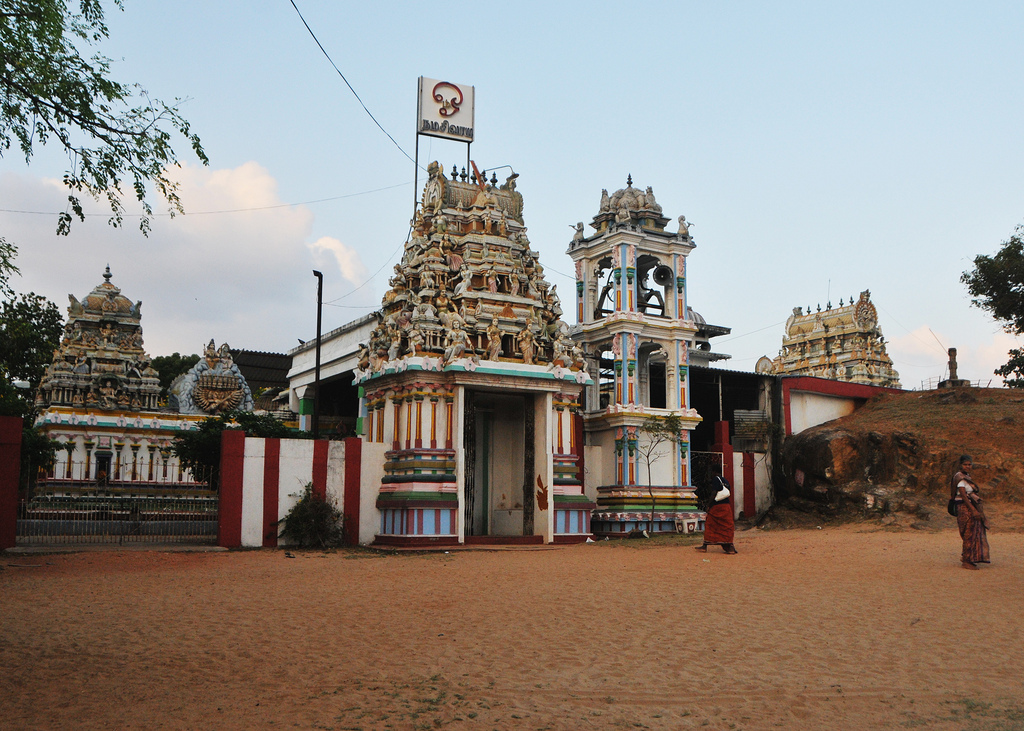
Koneswaram Temple, Trincomalee

- Ati Konanayakar, Thampalakamam
- Athi Sivan Temple, Kanguvely, Muttur
- Choleeswaram Temple, Kantalai
- Kantalai Sivan Temple, Peraru
- Koneswaram Temple, Trincomalee
- Nadesar Temple, Sivayouga Puram
- Pathirakali Amman Temple, Trincomalee
- Sivan Temple, Barathipuram, Kiliveddy, Muttur
- Sivan Temple, Gangai, Kinniya
- Sivan Temple, Lingapuram, Kiliveddy
- Sivan Temple, Mallikaithivu, Muttur
- Sri Visvanthaswamy Temple, Trincomalee
- Vellaivilpathira Koneswara Temple, Trincomalee

== Northern Province ==
=== Jaffna District ===
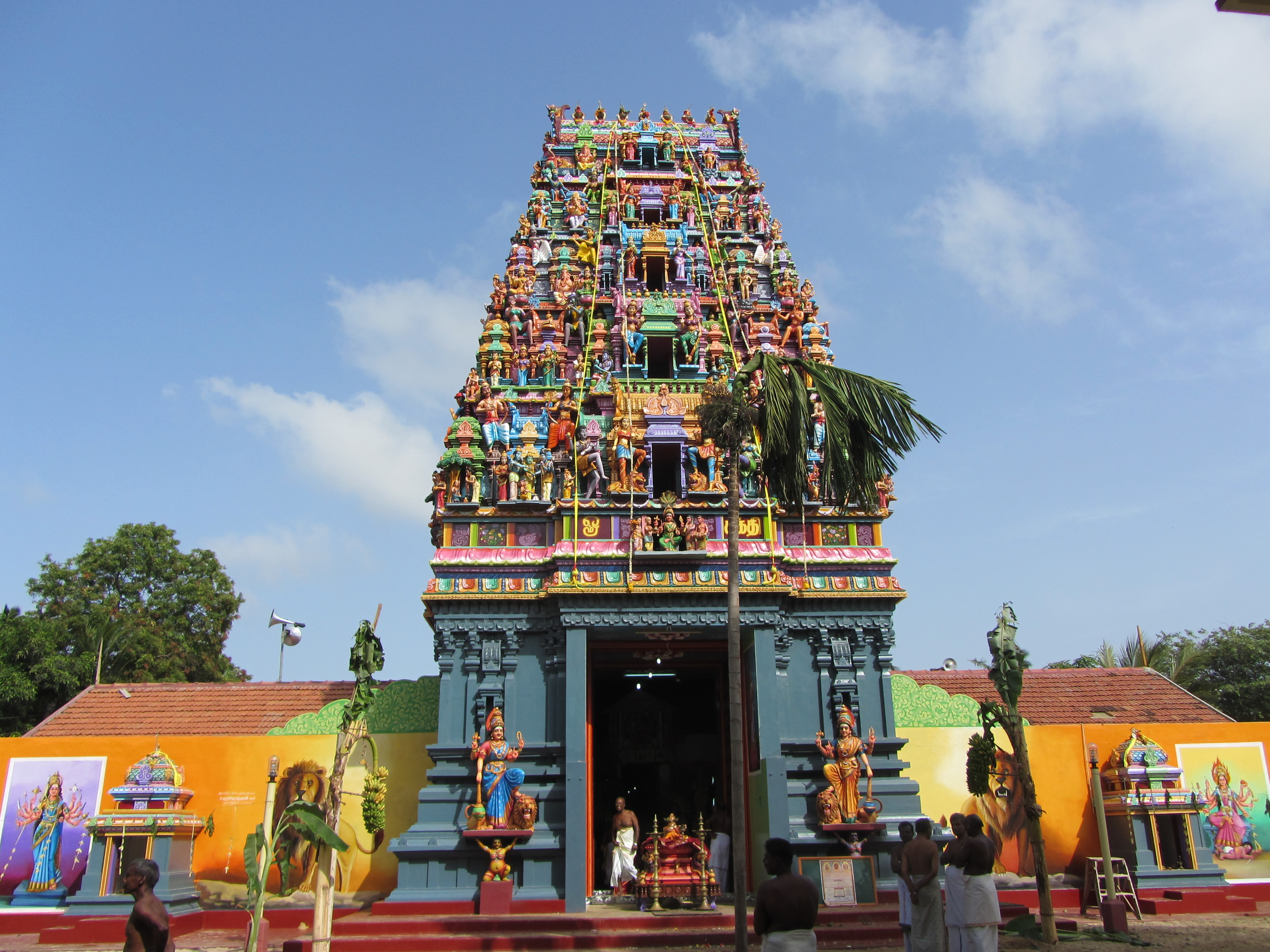
Ariyalai Mahamari Amman Temple

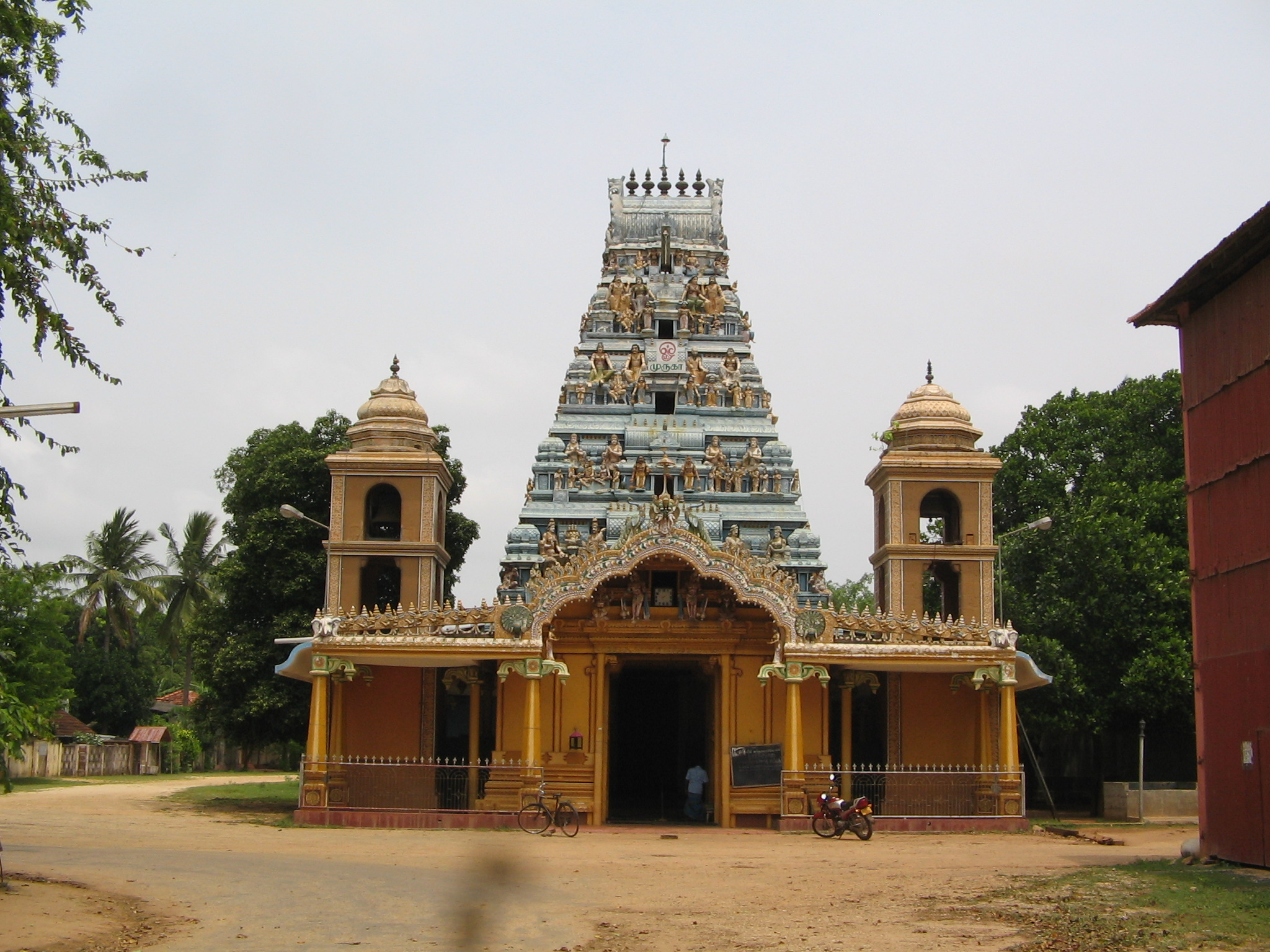
Innuvil Kandaswamy Temple

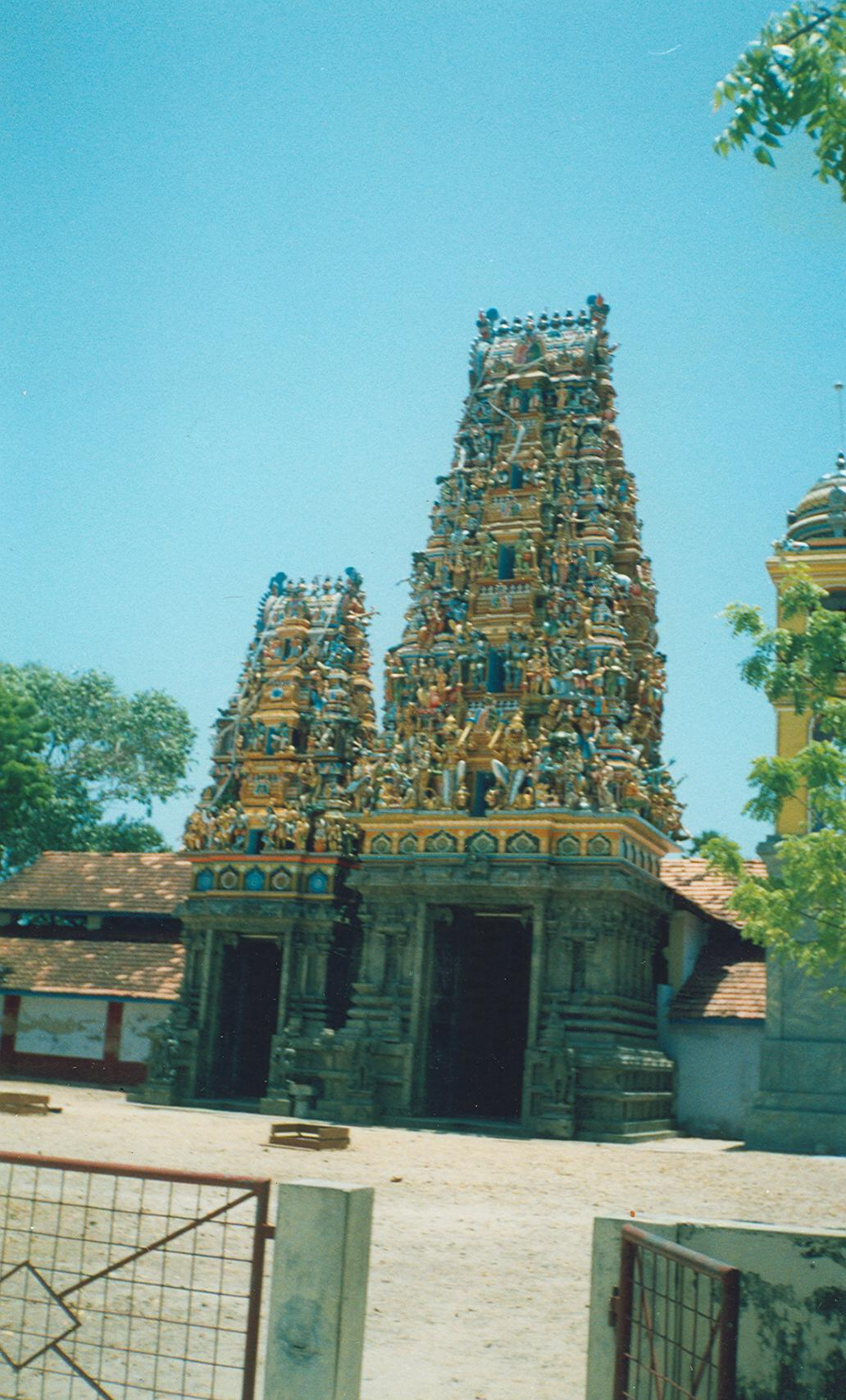
Karainagar Sivan Temple

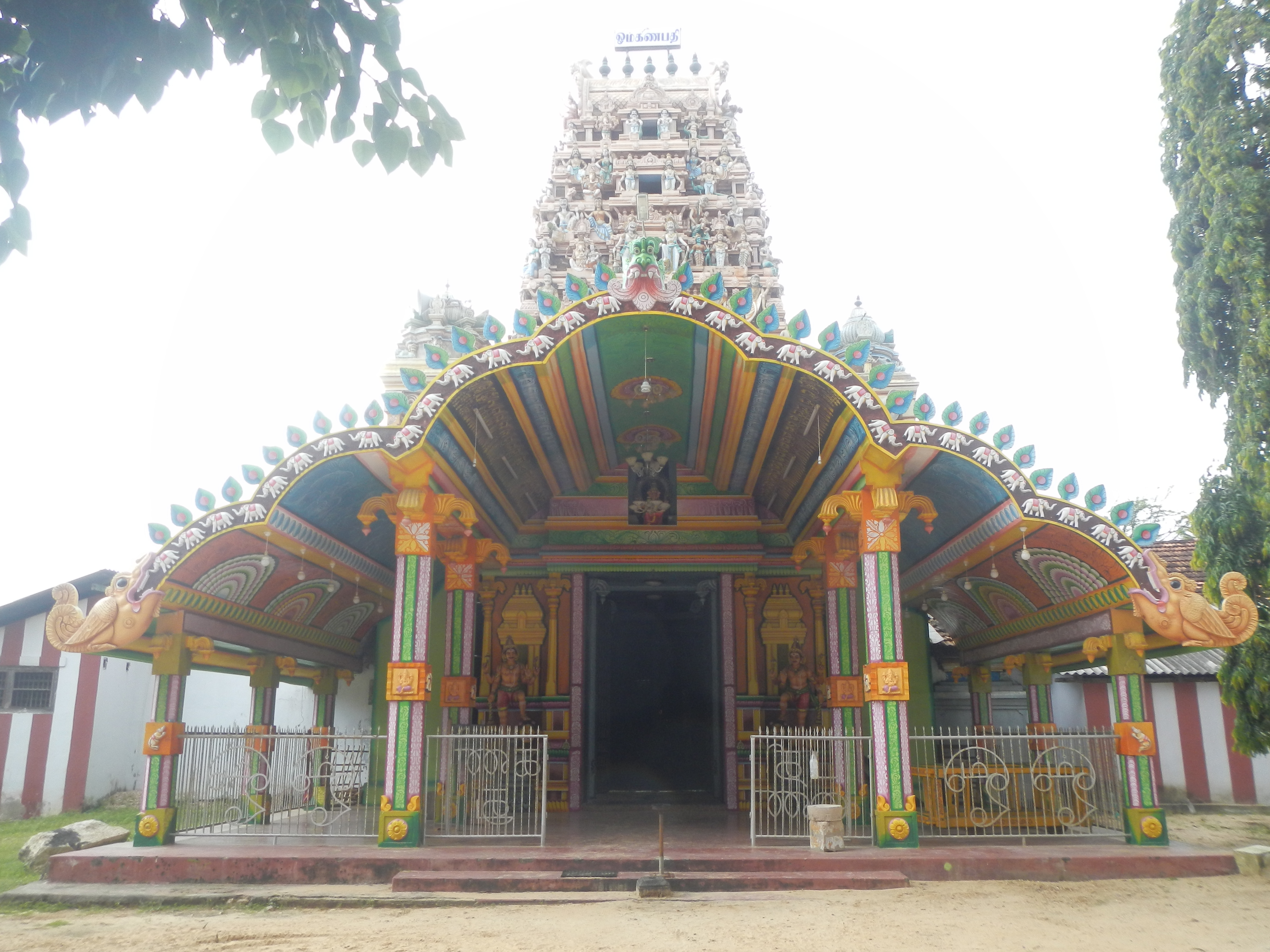
Kolampagamam Uppukulam Pillayar Temple

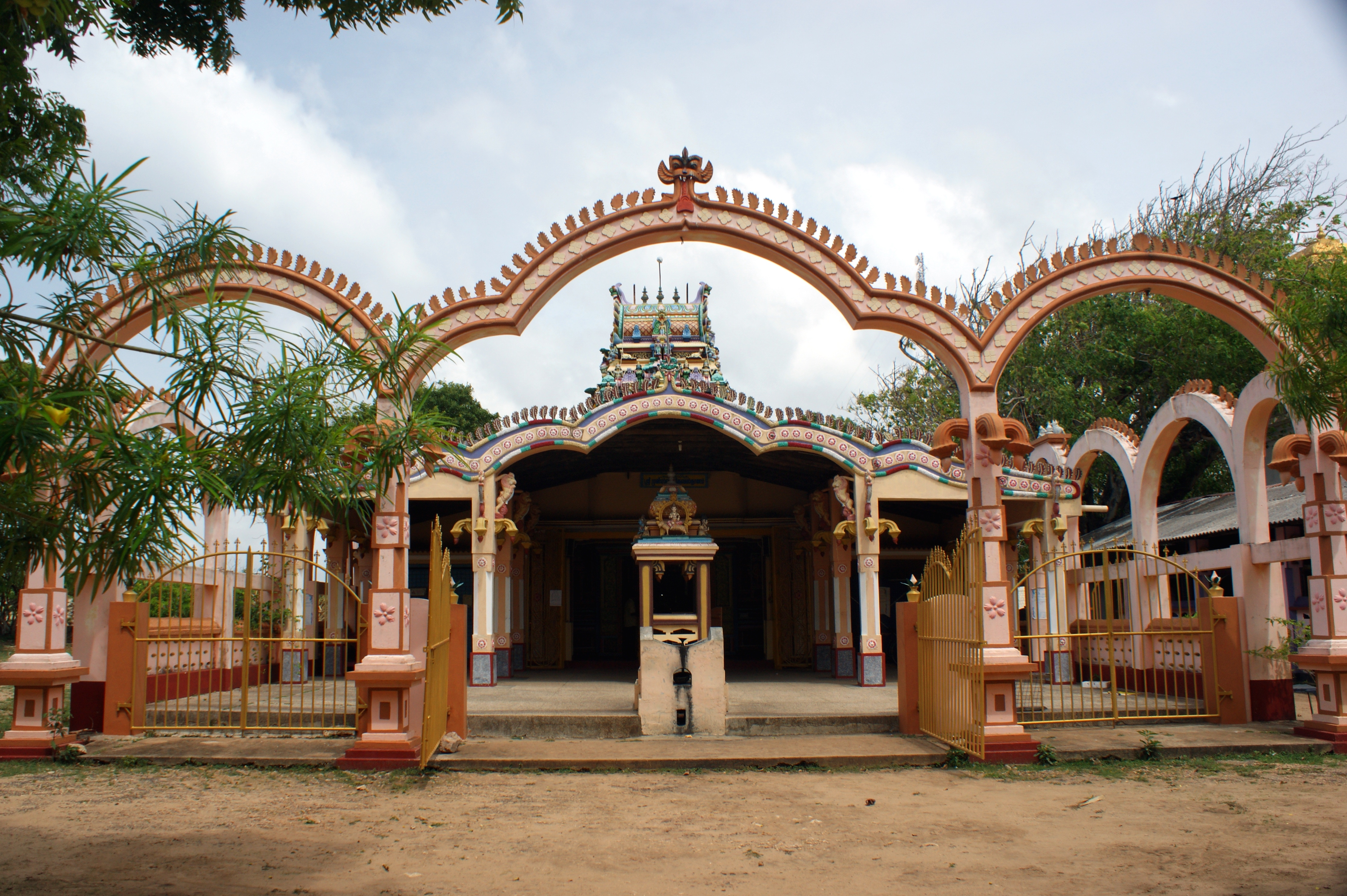
Kottai Muneeswarar Temple

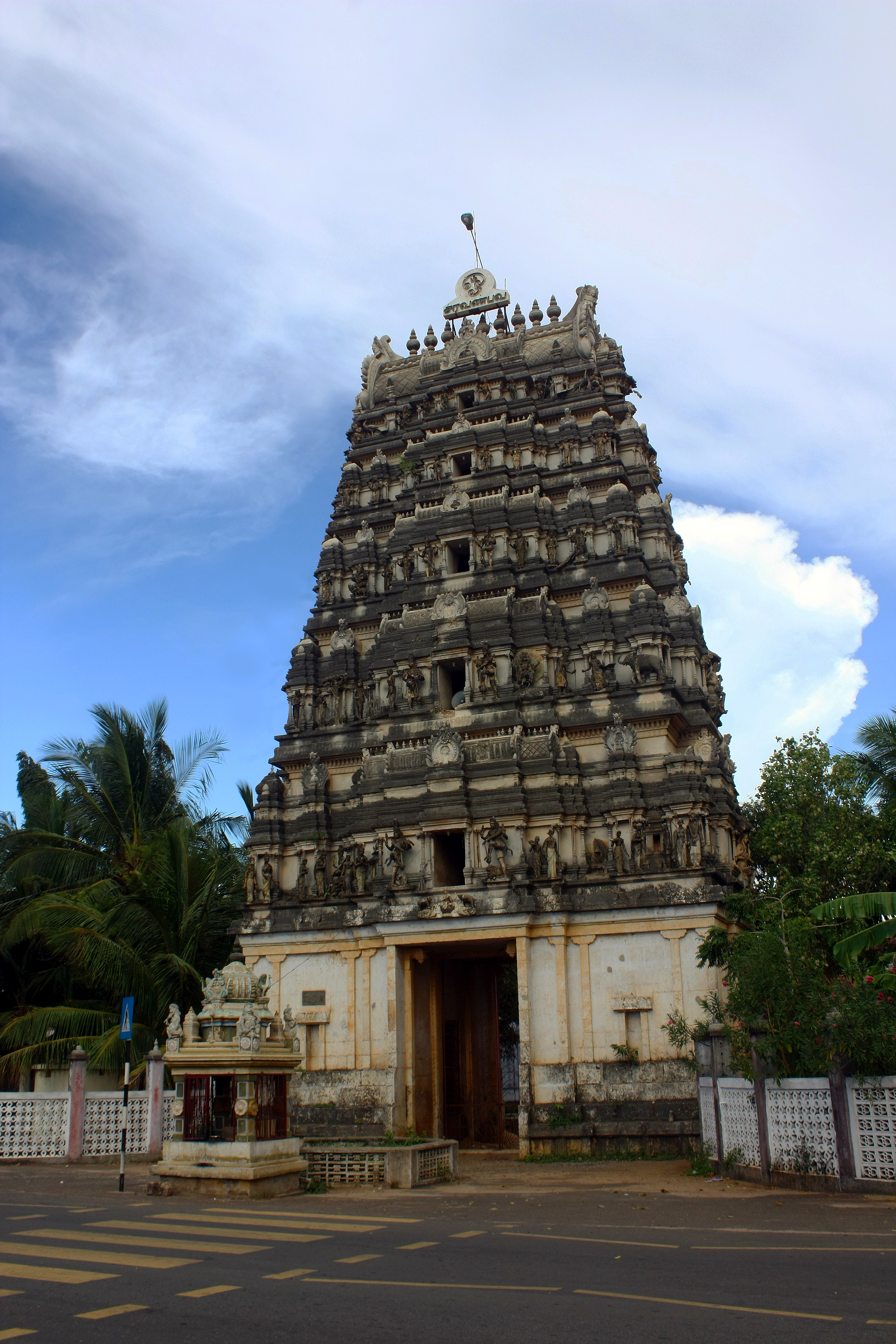
Maviddapuram Kandaswamy Temple

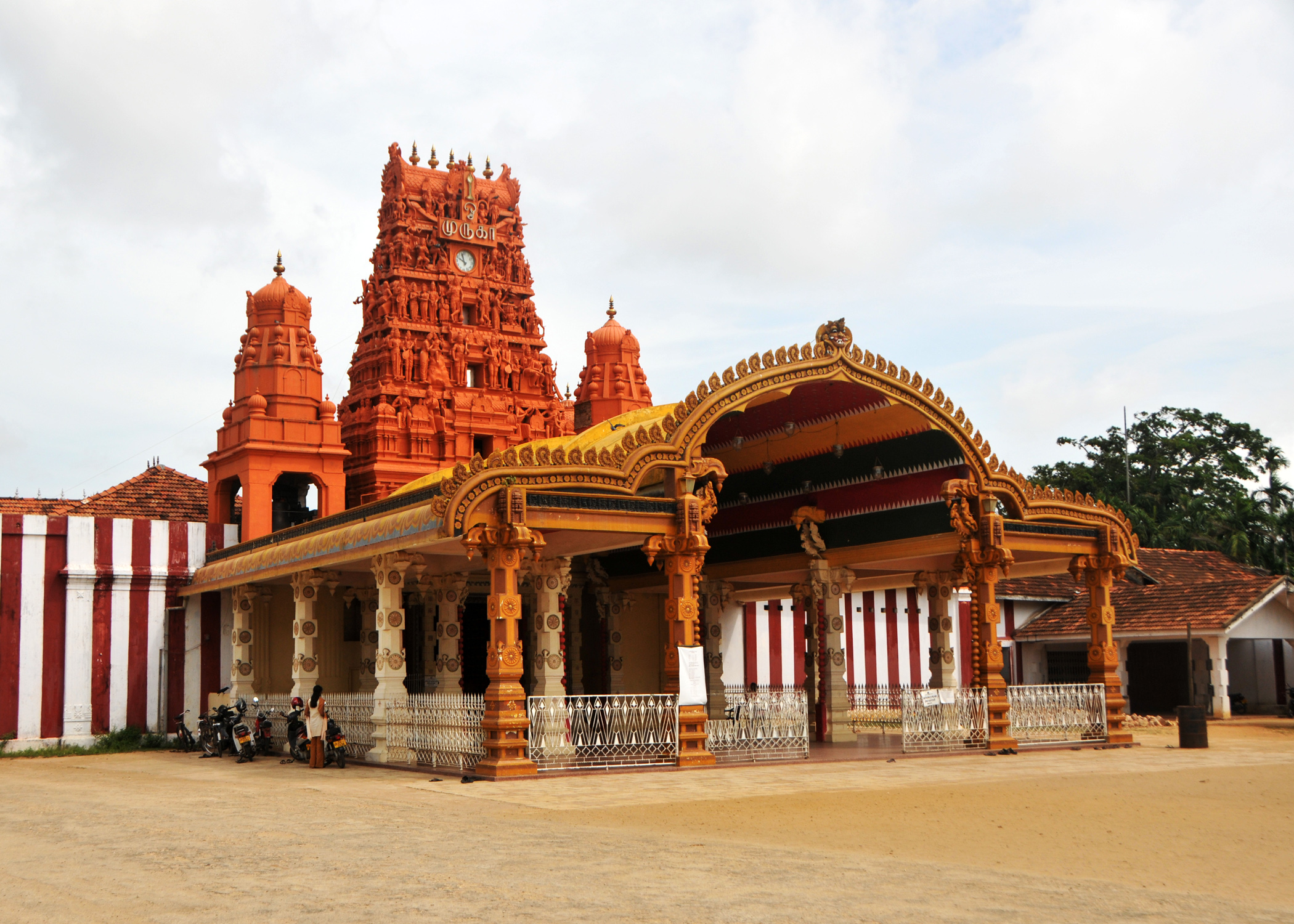
Nallur Kandaswamy Temple

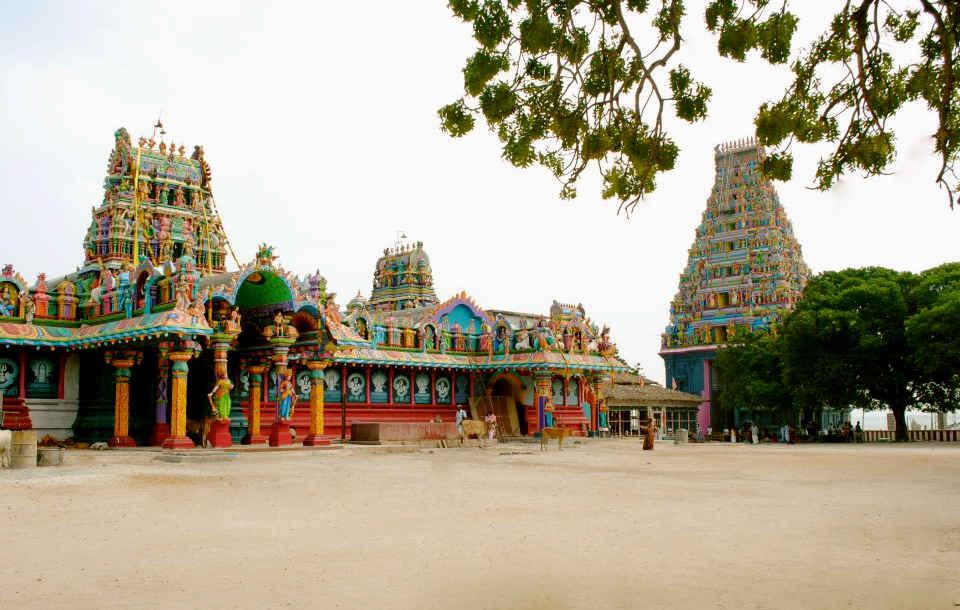
Nainativu Nagapooshani Amman Temple

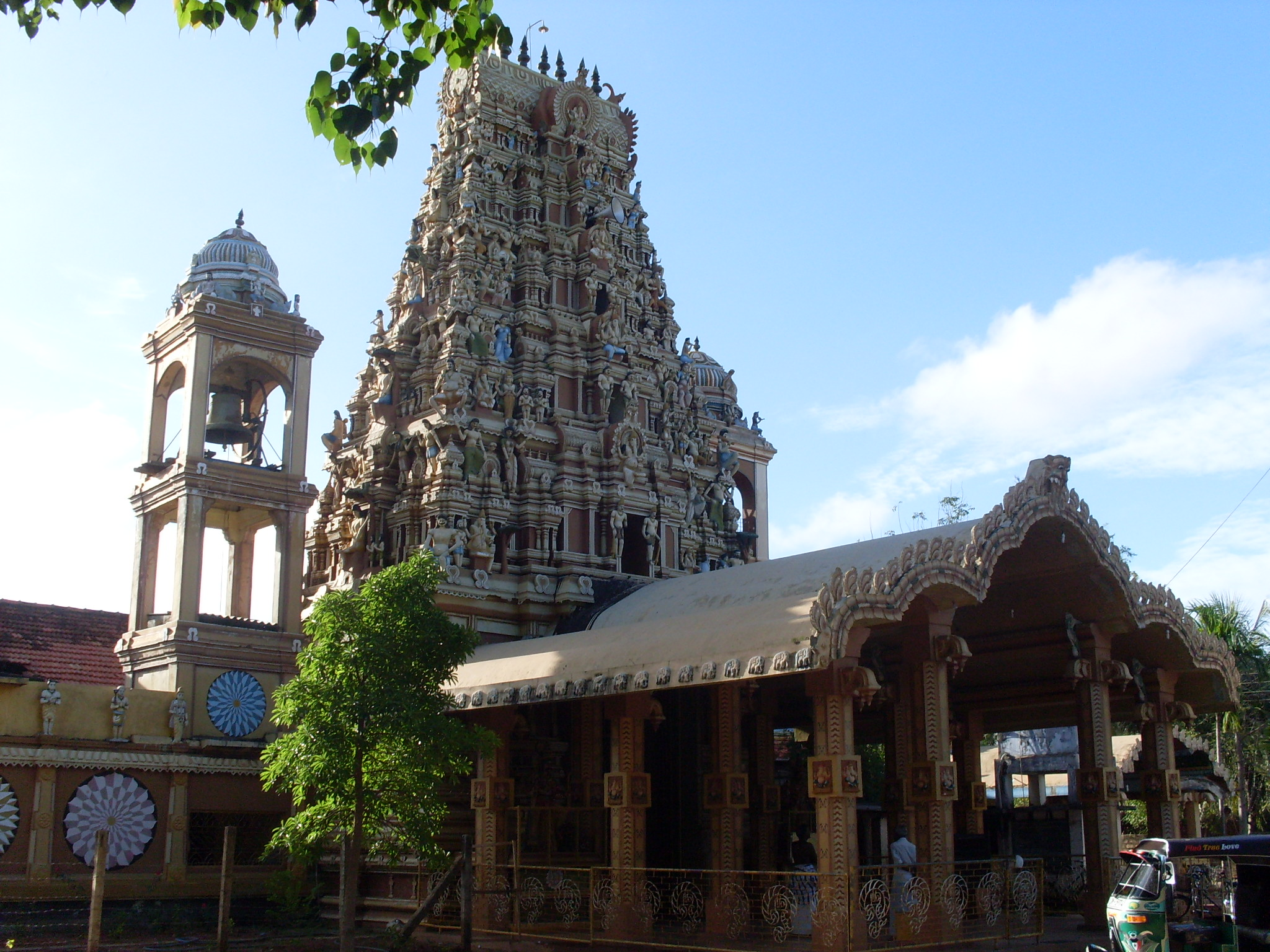
Urumpirai Katpakappillaiyaar Temple

- Aalamkanru Gnanavairavar Temple, Vetharadaippu, Karainagar, Kayts
- Aladai Vairavar Temple, Uyarapulam, Sandilipay
- Alady Sivan Temple, Puththur West
- Alady Vairavar Temple, Pungudutivu
- Alaveddy Datchinamoorthi Temple
- Alaveddy Pasupatheeswarar Temple
- Alaveddy Thiruvadineelal Temple
- Ambalavanar Temple, Karaikkal
- Ambalavaneswarar Temple, Pungadi, Ponnavodai, Ealalai West
- Anantha Nadarajah Temple, Mahajana College, Tellippalai
- Annamaheswarar Temple, Mylaney Noth, Chunnakam
- Anthikuli Gnanavairavar Temple, Savatkaddu, Sandilipay
- Arasady Pliar Temple, Sandilipay North, Sandilipay
- Arasady Vyravar Temple, Chankanai South, Valikamam West
- Ariyalai Neernochiyanthazhvu Sivan Temple
- Ariyalai Siddhivinayakar Temple (Sithivinayakar Temple), Ariyalai
- Arulmihu Gnanavairavar Temple, Kaithady West, Thenmarachchi
- Arulmihu Gnanavairavar Temple, Kokkuvil, Nallur
- Arulmihu Gnanavairavar Temple, Kondavil East, Nallur
- Arulmihu Gnanavairavar Temple, Kottawaththai, Karaveddy
- Arulmihu Manthikai Kanakai Amman Temple, Puloly South
- Arulmihu Paththanai Vairavar Temple, Alvai East, Karaveddy
- Arulmihu Sri Saamundaampikaa Sametha Eenchadi Gnanavairavar Temple, Suthumalai North, Manipay
- Athiparameswara Amman Temple, Kondavil
- Athi Vairavar Temple, Athikovilady, Point Pedro
- Athi Vairavar Temple, Pungudutivu
- Chandrasegaravaryvananathar Sivan Temple, Chavakachchery, Thenmarachchi
- Chankanai Singapore Gnana Vairavar Kovil Chankanai
- Chempithodda Gna Vairavar Temple, Araly South, Valikamam West
- Easan Temple, Poyiddy, Achchelu
- Eradijar Pulam Vairavar Temple, Sandilipay North, Sandilipay
- Gnanavairavar Temple, Ariyalai, Nallur
- Gnanavairavar Temple, Chavakachcheri
- Gnanavairavar Temple, Chulipuram Center, Valikamam West
- Gnanavairavar Temple, Eachchamoddai, Jaffna
- Gnanavairavar Temple, Kodikamam, Thenmarachchi
- Gnanavairavar Temple, Konavalai, Point Pedro
- Gnanavairavar Temple, Mallakam, Tellippalai
- Gnanavairavar Temple, Naranthanai East, Kayts
- Gnanavairavar Temple, Nediyakadu, Point Pedro
- Gnanavairavar Temple, Pungudutivu
- Gnanavairavar Temple, Sirupiddy, Kopay
- Gnanavairavar Temple, Sithiyampuliyady, Tellippalai
- Gnanavairavar Temple, Tholpuram West, Valikamam West
- Gnanavairavar Temple, Valanthalai, Karainagar, Kayts
- Gnanavairavar Temple, Velanai, Islands South
- Idaikkadu Kasi Vishvanathar Temple
- Idippan Sivan Temple, Saravanai East, Velanai
- Ilupai Mulai Pillayaar Temple, Polikandy, Valvettithurai
- Imayanan North Sivan Gnana Vairavar Temple
- Innuvil Kandaswamy, Inuvil West, Inuvil
- Inuvil Sivan Temple
- Inuvil Sri Pararasa Segara Pillaiyar Temple, Inuvil West, Inuvil
- Iraddaipulam Gnanavairavar Temple, Sandilipay
- Irupalai Vaitheesvara Swamy Temple
- Jambunathar Sivan Temple, Pannipulam, Valikamam West
- Kaddaipirai Amman Kovil, Kaddaipirai
- Kaddy Sivan Temple, Karanavai East
- Kailasanathar Kailasapillaiyar Temple, Nallur
- Kalainagar Kampanpulo Athivairavar Temple, Sithankerny
- Kalaiyady Sivan Temple, Panippulam
- Kalavathurai Ganan Vyravar Temple, Araly South, Valikamam West
- Kalvalai Pillaiyar Temple, Kalvalai Nadukurichi, Sandilipay, Sandilipay
- Kanagambikasametha Kannikesara Temple, Vaddukoddai West
- Kanai Vairavar Temple, Kanai, Puloly
- Kandawsamy Temple, Neerverly North, Neervely
- Kannakai Amman Temple, Pungudutivu
- Kanapatheeswaram Sivan Temple, Kayts
- Kandaswamy Vairavar Temple, Nunavil Centre, Chavakachcheri
- Kannalingeswarar Temple, Thirunelveli
- Kanthavanam Temple, Polikandy, Valvettithurai
- Karainagar Temple (Eelathu Chithambaram), Karaitivu
- Karukambai Easwaran Temple, Puththur East
- Kasikandam Sivan Temple, Navaly, Manipay
- Kasi Viswanathar Temple, Keerimalai, Thellipalai
- Kasi Viswanathar Temple, Thellipalai
- Kilisiddy Gnanavairavar Temple, Irumbu Mathavady, Vathiry, Karaveddy
- Kiranjiyampathi Minakshi Sundareshwarar Temple, Perungadu, Pungudutivu
- Kirriappai Aman Kovil, Siruppiddy, Neervely
- Kirubhakhara Sivasubramaniya Temple (Puthuk Temple), Kokuvil East
- Koddadiperan Sivan Temple, Chulipuram West, Valikamam West
- Koilamanai Maruthady Sivan Temple, Koyilamanai, Kodikamam, Thenmarachchi
- Konamalai Vairavar Temple, Kokuvil East, Nallur
- Koneswarar Temple, Thondamanaru, Point Pedro
- Koonan Paruththy Vairavar Temple, Ilakady, Karainagar, Kayts
- Kottu Vassal Amman Temple (Sandika Parameswari Amman Temple), Point Pedro
- Kovitkadavai, Thunnalai
- Koyvalai Nadarajah Ramalingha Swamy Temple, Aavarangal
- Kulathady Vairavar Temple, Polikandy West, Point Pedro
- Kunthady Sivan Temple, Vadaliyadaippu
- Kupplan Pillair Kovil, Kupplan
- Kurunthady Vairavar Temple, Pungudutivu
- Kumarakoddam Gnanavairavar Temple, Kondavil, Nallur
- Lanka Paruthi Vyravar Temple, Chankanai Center
- Lingeswarar Temple, Keerimalai, Tellippalai
- Maijer Kotti Vairavar Temple, Sandilipay North, Sandilipay
- Mangalambika Sametha Mangaleswarar Temple, Vaddukoddai West
- Manthiddy Vairavar Temple, Valalai, Achchuveli
- Maruthady Gnanavairavar Temple, Point Pedro
- Maruthady Thanthonreeswarar Temple, Vadamaratchi
- Maruthady Vairavar Temple, Pungudutivu
- Masivan Meenadsiyamman Temple, Neervely West
- Mavady Ganavairavar Temple, Chankanai South, Valikamam West
- Mavady Vaitheeswara Temple, Valvetty Centre
- Meesalai Panrikkeni Kandasamy Kovil
- Maviddapuram Kandaswamy Temple, Maviddapuram
- Mayiliyar Vairavar Temple, Idaikurichchy, Varany, Thenmarachchi
- Moochampilavu Sivan Temple, Vallipuram, Puloly
- Muruka Moorthi Temple, Alangkulai, Sandilipay North, Sandilipay
- Muthaliyam Temple, Palaly East, Palaly
- Muththuchamiar Sivan Temple, Nainativu
- Nadarajapperumal Temple, Velanai West
- Nadarasar Temple, Palaly South, Vasavilan
- Nagathambirann Alayam, Valalai West, Achchuveli
- Nagendra Madam Sivan Temple, Arali North
- Naguleswaram Temple, Keerimalai
- Nainativu Nagapooshani Amman Temple, Nainativu
- Nallur Kandaswamy temple, Nallur
- Nallur Sivan Temple
- Nanthavil Amman Temple kokuvil
- Narasingha Vairavar Temple, Shanthypuram, Madduvil North, Thenmarachchi
- Nayinai Nakapoosani Amman Temple, Nayinathivu
- Nedunkulam Gnanavairavar Temple, Delft
- Neelathakshi Samedha Sri Kayagaroneshwarar Temple, Thirunelveli
- Neeraviyadi Sri Natesar Temple
- Nikara Gnanavyravar Temple, Chankanai West, Valikamam West
- Nunasai Sivan Temple, Madakal, Sandilipay
- Nunasai Vishalakshi Vishvanatheswarar Temple, Madakal, Sandilipay
- Odakarai Sivan Temple, Chanknai South, Valikamam West
- Ollai Vembady Gnanavairavar Temple, Neervely, Kopay
- Olludai Gnavairavar Temple, Kadivalai Elavalai, Tellippalai
- Om Sri Palayadipillayar Temple, Meesalai
- Paddaiyolachchy Veerapaththeerar Temple, Meesalai East, Thenmarachchi
- Palaivairavar, Pungudutivu
- Palaly Raja Rajeswari Amman Temple, Palaly East, Palaly
- Palaly Paththira kali kovil, Palaly Esat, Palaly
- Paralai Eeswara Vinayagar Temple, Chulipuram East
- Paramasivan Temple, Ketpeli West, Mirusuvil, Thenmarachchi
- Parameswaran Kovil, University of Jaffna, Kokuvil
- Pasupatheeswarar Alayam, Paruthithurai, Puloly, Point Pedro
- Periya Thambiran Temple, Idaikkadu, Achchuveli
- Periya Thambiran Temple, palaly East, Palaly
- Perunthalai Sivan Temple, Sirupiddy West, Neervely, Kopay
- Ponnampalavaneswarar Temple, Koddai
- Poothavirayar Temple, Siruppiddy East Neervely
- Puloly Pasupatheeswarar Temple
- Puthaiyadi Vairavar Temple, Pungudutivu
- Puttalai Pillayar Temple, Puttalai
- Raja Rajeswary Amman Temple, Palaly east, Palaly
- Ramalingeshwarar, Panavidai, Urathivu, Pungudutivu
- Saaththiriyar Madam Anjaneyar Temple, Sangarathai
- Saaththiriyar Madam Murugan Temple, Sangarathai
- Sadaiyaly Gnanavairavar Temple, Sadaiyaly, Karainagar, Kayts
- Sadaiyandy Vairavar Temple, Valvai South West, Point Pedro
- Sakkalawathay Gnanavairavar Temple, Karaveddy
- Saddanathar Temple, Nallur
- Sampunathar Sivan Temple, Pannipulam, Valikamam West
- Samundathevi Sametha Gnanavairavar Temple, Kondavil, Nallur
- Sandirasekara Veerapathira Swamy Temple, Udupiddy South
- Sangarathai Pittiyam Pathy Pathirakali Temple
- Sangaththanai Meenakshi Amman temple chavakachcheri
- Sanguvelly Sivagnana Pillaiyar Temple
- Sanguvelly Vettukkattai Pillaiyar Temple
- Sankili Vairavar Temple, Barathi Veethy, Achchuveli, Point Pedro
- Sankili Vairavar Temple, Paththaimeni, Achchuveli, Kopay
- Santanamutalichipuram Srinadarasamoorthy Temple, Kudiyiruppu
- Sattanathar Temple, Rajathani, Nallur
- Sekarasa sekarappillaiyar Temple, Inuvil West, Inuvil
- Sella Pillaiyar Temple, Siruppiddy, Neervely
- Selva Sannithi Temple, Thondamararu
- Sinnavalavu Gnavairavar Temple, Araly North, Valikamam West
- Sithamparam Ambalavanr Temple, Chankanai Center, Valikamam West
- Sivagnavairavar Temple, Kailaya Valavu, Mallakam, Tellippalai
- Sivan Temple, Aavarangal, Valvettithurai
- Sivan Temple, Alady, Chunnakam, Uduvil
- Sivan Temple, Allolai
- Sivan Temple, Arali South
- Sivan Temple, Colombuthurai, Jaffna
- Sivan Temple, Columbuthurai West, Jaffna
- Sivan Temple, Kadduvan Kulam, Saravanai
- Sivan Temple, Kaladdy, Valvettithurai
- Sivan Temple (Eelaththu Sithamparam), Karainagar, Kayts
- Sivan Temple, Kayts
- Sivan Temple, Kopay South
- Sivan Temple, Kovitpulam, Tellippalai
- Sivan Temple, Mahiyapiddy
- Sivan Temple, Mudamavady Santhi
- Sivan Temple, Mullanai, Ilavalai
- Sivan Temple, Muchampulavu, Puloly South, Point Pedro
- Sivan Temple, Poovatkarai, Puloly, Point Pedro
- Sivan Temple, 3rd Ward, Pungudutivu
- Sivan Temple, 7th Ward, Pungudutivu
- Sivan Temple, Pungudutivu
- Sivan Temple, Punnalaikadduwan South, Uduvil
- Sivan Temple (Nadarasar Ramalingasamy Temple), Puththur West
- Sivan Temple (Vishalakshi Vishvanathar Temple), Sudumalai North, Sandilipay
- Sivan Temple, Theivendram, Sithankeny
- Sivan and Vairavar Temple, Alaveddy South
- Sivapootharatheswarar Temple, Udumpirai East
- Sivasubramaniyar Temple, Nallur
- Sri Aathy Vairavar Temple, Kayts
- Sri Ampalavanr Temple, Nedunkulam, Jaffna
- Sri Gnavairavar Temple, Sangaththanai, Islands South
- Sri Gnanavairavar Perumal Temple, Thirunelveli North, Nallur
- Sri Gnaneswarar Temple, Kondavil East, Nallur
- Sri Gana Vyravar Temple, Nainativu
- Sri Kailasanathar Temple, Nallur
- Sri Kamalambikaisametha Kailasasamy Temple, Nallur
- Sri Kathiramalai Sivan Temple, Chunnakam
- Sri Mahaa Ganapathi Pillaiyaar Temple, Sithankerney, Valikamam West
- Sri Meenadchi Somasundareswaraswamy Temple (Amman Temple), Uduvil
- Sri Muthu Vinayagar Temple, Ariyalai
- Sri Nagawaratha Naaraayanar Thevasthanam, Alaveddy
- Sri Nageswaran Temple, Puliyantivu, Analaitivu
- Sri Pathirakali Amman/Ambaal Temple, Polikandy, VVT
- Sri Potpathi Vinayakar Temple, Kokuvil East
- Sri Puveneswarar Ambal Temple, Kondavil, Nallur
- Sri Shankaranathar Murugamoorthy Temple, Analaitivu
- Sri Sithambareswara Sivakamyambal Devas, Karainagar Center, Kayts
- Sri Siva Sithamparaeswarar Temple, Sithankerny, Valikamam West
- Sri Vallipura Aalwar Temple, Vallipuram, Puloly
- Sri Veerapaththira Temple, Velanai, Islands South
- Sri Visalachchi Samatha Visvanathar Temple, Araly Centre, Valikamam West
- Sri Vishvanatha Swamy Temple (Sivan Temple), Myalaney, Chunnakam
- Sri Visvalinga Maha Kanapathy Temple, Vannarpannai North West
- Sri Visvareswaraswamy Temple, Karaikkal, Inuvil East, Kondavil
- Suthumalai Puvaneswary Amman Temple (Suthumalai)
- Suthumalai Murugan Temple (Suthumalai)
- Thantrontreeswarar Amman Temple, Alaveddy West
- Thanthontry Gnavairavar Temple, Kaithady, Navatkuly South, Thenmarachchi
- Thanthontry Manonmani Amman Temple, Naranthanai North, Kayts
- Thillai Sivan Temple, Mandaitivu
- Thoddaththu Vairavar Temple, Puloly
- Thuratti Panai MuththuMari Amman Temple, Vaddukoddai East
- Thuvali Kannakai Amman Temple, Uduppiddy
- Ubayakathirgamam, Upayakathirkamam, Puloly
- Urumpirai Chokkanathar Temple
- Vaddukoddai Sivan Temple (Visaladchi Visvesar, Verrapathirar)
- Vaduvavaththai Veerapathrar Temple, Vaduvavaththai, Puloly
- Vairavar Temple, Kaithady Center, Kumaranagar, Thenmarachchi
- Vairavar Temple, Karamban, Kayts
- Vairavar Temple, Kulathady, Jaffna
- Vairavar Temple, Madduvil South, Thenmarachchi
- Vairavar Temple, Manthuvil West, Kodikamam, Thenmarachchi
- Vairavar Temple, Netkolu, Thondamanaru, Point Pedro
- Vairavar Temple, Revady, Point Pedro
- Vairavar Temple, Sithambaramoorthikerny, Kayts
- Vairavar Temple, Saravanai West, Velanai, Islands South
- Vairavar Temple, Siruppiddy East, Neervely
- Vairavar Temple, Siruppiddy, Neervely
- Vairavar Temple, VVT, Point Pedro
- Vairavar Muniyappar Temple, Kaithady Center, Kumaranagar, Thenmarachchi
- Valalai East Kali Temple, Valalai, Atchuvely
- Valalai Neerppeddy Murugan Temple, Valalai, Atchuvely
- Valalai Pillayar Temple, Valalai, Atchuvely
- Valambikai Sametha Vaitheeswara Temple, Karaveddy
- Valambikai Sametha Vaitheeswara Temple, Valvai South West, Point Pedro
- Vallai Vaitheeswaran Temple, Vallai South West, Valvettithurai
- Valliappar Gnanavairavar Temple, Karaveddy
- Vallipuranathar Temple, Kondavil Center
- Vaaykkaal Taravai Pillaiyaar Temple, Neerverly North, Neervely
- Vannai Sri Kamakshi Amman Kovil (Nachchimar Temple), Vannarpannai, Jaffna
- Vannai Sri Vengadesa Varatharaja Perumal Temple, Jaffna
- Vannai Sri Veermakali Amman Temple, Jaffna
- Vannarpannai Vaitheeswaran Temple, Vannarpannai
- Veeramalai Vairavar Temple, Pungudutivu
- Veerapathirar Temple, Katkovalam, Point Pedro
- Veerapathirar Temple, Ketpeli Centre, Mirusuvil, Thenmarachchi
- Veerapathirar Temple, Maravanpulo North, Thenmarachchi
- Veerapathirar Temple, Palavy South, Kodikamam, Thenmarachchi
- Veerapathirar Temple, Pungudutivu
- Velakkai Pillaiyar Temple, Manipay
- Visaladchi Ambika Sametha Vishvanathaswamy Temple, Vattakkaipathy, Kantharodai
- Vishalkshi Vishwanathar Temple, Puthur, Valvedditturai
- Visvanatha Sivan Temple, Mylani, Chunnakam
- Villoonri Veeragathi Vinayagar Temple, Jaffna

Sangaththani Vairavaswmi Kanthaswami Kovil (Kuddi Nallur)

=== Kilinochchi District ===
- Addathuddivairavar Temple, Gnanimadam, Poonakari
- Aknivairavar Temple, Gnanimadam, Poonakari
- Alady Vinayakar Alayam, Ramanathapuram Center, Kilinochchi
- Arasarkerny Sivan Temple, Pallai
- Athmalingeswarar Alayam, Ramanathapuram, Kilinochchi
- Aththikandu Vairavar Temple, Arasar Kerny, Pallai
- Kallady Vairavar Temple, Pallai
- Kampilivairavar Temple, Gnanimadam, Poonakari
- Kanakampikai Ampal Great Temple, Iranaimadu, Kilinochchi
- Karanthai Vairavar Temple, Tharmakerny, Pallai
- Maruthady Vairavar Temple, Gnanimadam, Poonakari
- Mudavairavar Temple, Pallikkudha, Poonakari
- Monduvan Vairavar Temple, Arasar Kerny, Pallai
- Nainakaddu Vairavar Temple, Veddukkadu, Poonakari
- Narasimmavairavar Temple, Pallai Nagar, Pallai
- Pampadiththan Vairavar Temple, Sempankunru, Poonakari
- Paddivairavar Temple, Gowtharimuani, Poonakari
- Sivan Temple, Allippalai, Pallai
- Sivan Temple, Kanakambikai Kulam, Karachchi
- Sivan Temple, Krishnapuram, Karachchi
- Sivan Temple, Mayavanoor, Karachchi
- Sivan Temple, Uthayanagar West, Karachchi
- Sudalai Vairavar Temple, Puthumurippu, Karachchi
- Uruthirapureeswaram Sivan Temple
- Vaikalady Vairavar Temple, Karrukkaithivu, Poonakari
- Vairavar Temple, Akkarayan, Karachchi
- Vairavar Temple, Cheddiyakuruchchi, Poonakari
- Vairavar Temple (Kannakai Ambal Temple), Kaneshapuram, Kilinochchi
- Vairavar Temple, Kavakulam, Poonakari
- Vairavar Temple, Madduvilnadu West, Poonakari
- Vairavar Temple, Samippulam, Poonakari
- Vairavar Temple, Selvapuram, Poonakari
- Vairavar Temple, Sithankuruchchi, Poonakar
- Vairavar Temple, Thirunagar, Karachchi
- Vairavar Temple, Thirunagar North, Karachchi
- Vayalur Murugan Temple, Kilinochchi
- Veerapathirar Temple, Karikkoddukkulam, Poonakari
- Veerapathirar Temple, Mannaiththalai, Poonakari
- Vilathikadu Vairavar Temple, Nallur, Poonakari
- Vinayahapuram Pillayar Temple, Kilinochchi

=== Mannar District ===
- Ellapparmaruthankulam Vinayagar Temple
- Ketheeswaram Temple, Mathottam
- Shiva Temple, Iranai Illuppaikkulam
- Sivan Temple, Savatkaddu
- Sri Muthumariyamman Temple, Talaimannar

=== Mullaitivu District ===
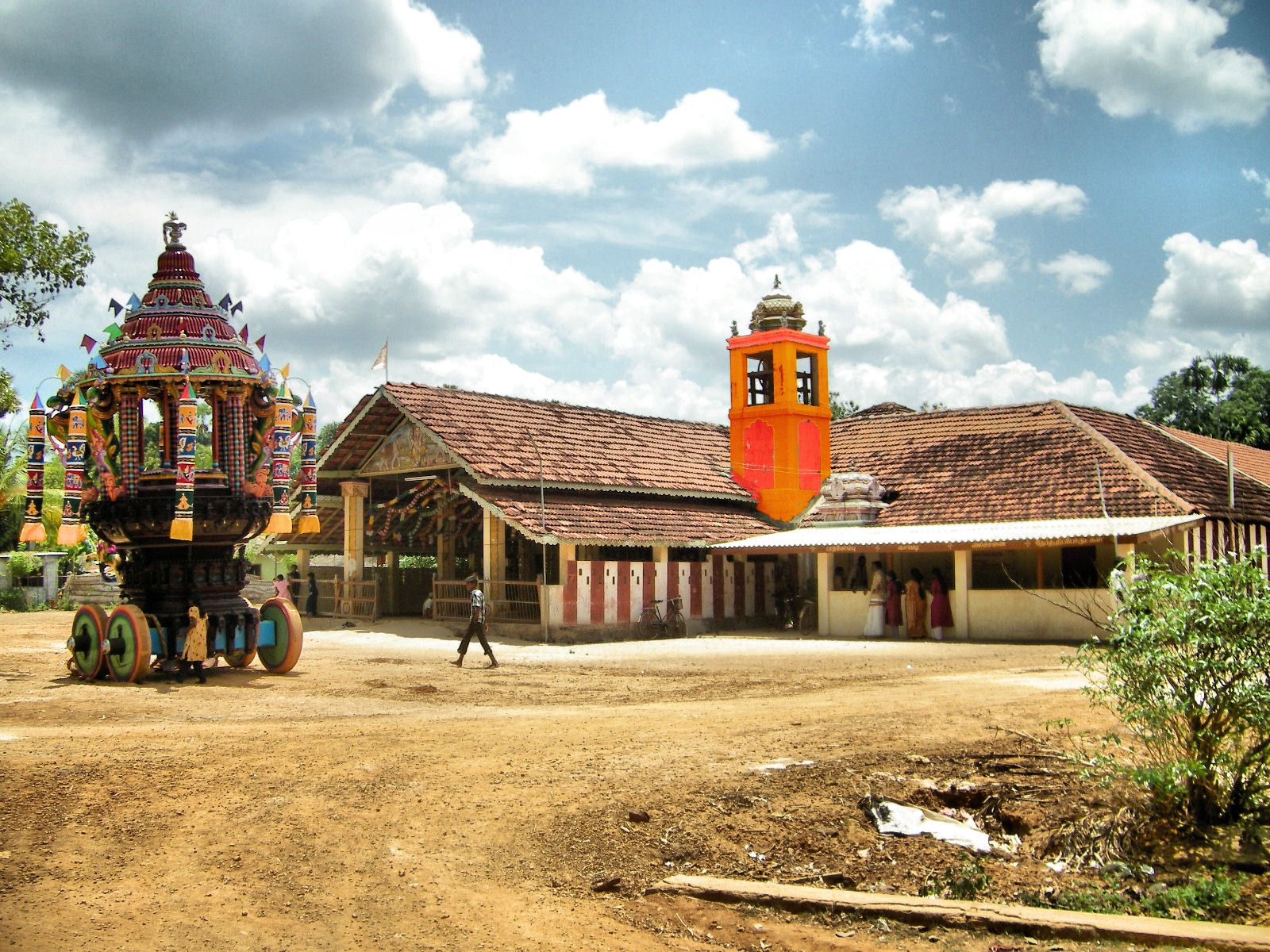
Muliyavalai Vinayagar Temple

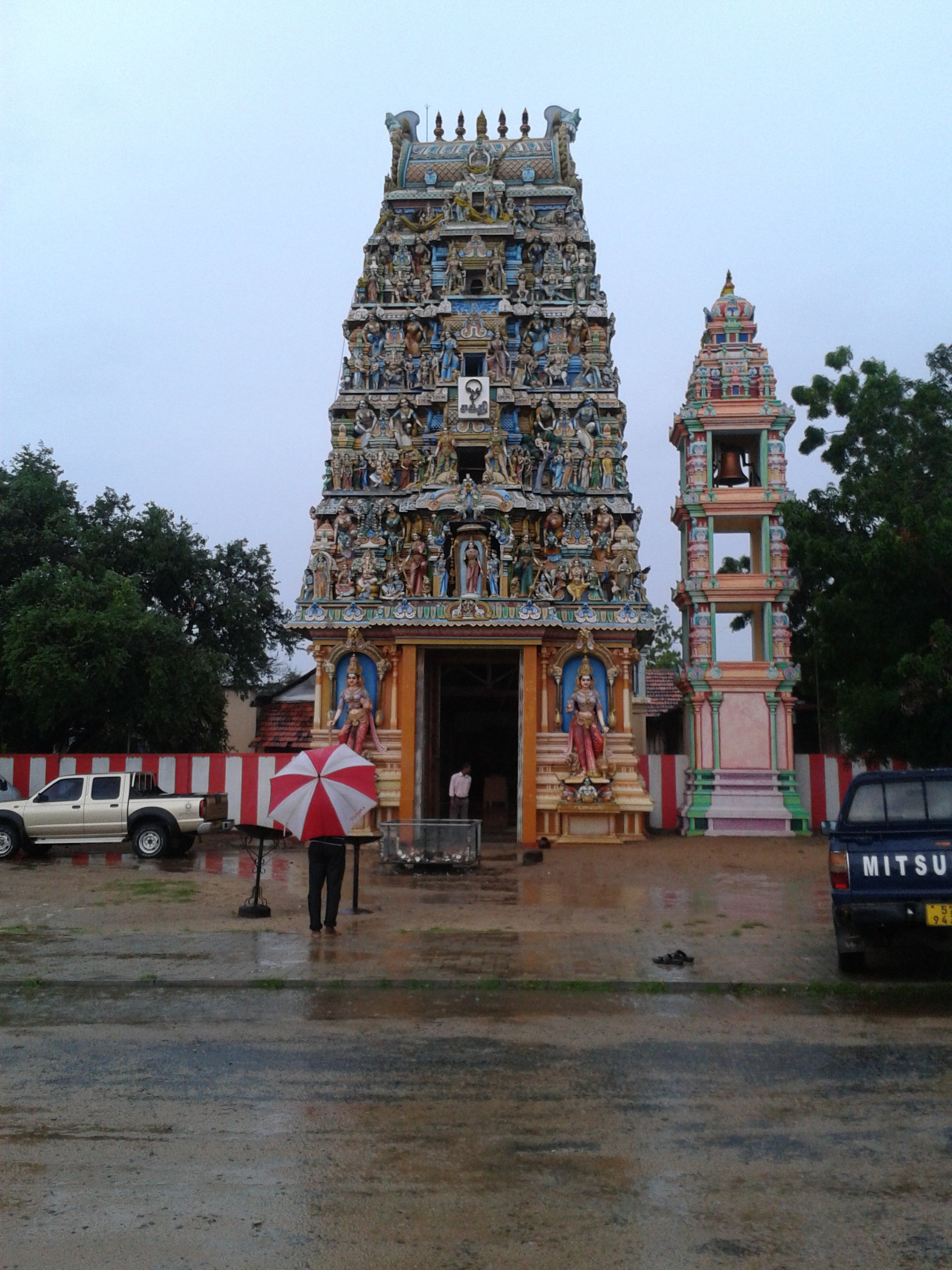
Vattappalai Kannaki Amman Temple

- Amman Temple, Thunukkai
- Athivairavar Temple, Kallappadu, Mullaitivu
- Athivairavar Temple, Karippaddamurippu, Oddusuddan
- Gnanavairavar Temple, Karippaddamurippu, Oddusuddan
- Gnanavairavar Temple, Mullaitivu, Maritimepattu
- Iyanar Temple, Uyilankulam, Thunukkai
- Karpaka Venayakar, Uyilankulam, Thunukkai
- Murugan Temple, Viji Ved Kallappadu, Mullaitivu
- Narasimmar Temple, Uyilankulam, Thunukkai
- Pathalavairavar Temple, Olumadu, Mankulam, Oddusuddan
- Puthukkula Venayakar, Puthukkulam, Thunukkai
- Sannarsi Temple Uyilankulam, Thunukkai
- Selva Venayakar, Veddajadappu, Thunukkai
- Sivan Temple, Inthupuram, Thirumurukandy
- Sivan Temple, Koddaikaddiyakulam, Thunukkai
- Sivan Temple, Manthuvil, Puthukudiyiruppu
- Sivan Temple, Puthukudiyiruppu
- Soolavairavar Temple, Olumadu, Mankulam, Oddusuddan
- Thanthondreeswarar Temple, Mullaitivu
- Thantrontreeswarar Temple, Oddusuddan
- Thiththakarai Amman Temple Kallappadu
- Vairavar Temple, Katkidangu, Mankulam, Oddusuddan
- Vairavar Temple, Mankulam Veethy, Oddusuddan
- Vairavar Temple, Sammalan Kulam, Oddusuddan
- Veravaththerer Temple Uyilankulam, Thunukkai

=== Vavuniya District ===
- Gnavairavar Temple, Vavuniya, Rambaikulam
- Kanagarayankulam Ithiyadi Siththivinayagar Temple, Kanagarayankulam, Vavuniya
- Kovilkulam Sivan Temple, Vavuniya
- Sannasi Vairavar Temple, Kaththar Sinnakkulam, Vavuniya
- Sasthirikulam Sivan Temple, Vavuniya
- Sivan Temple, Thonickkal
- Sri Muththumari Amman Temple, Thonikkal, Vavuniya
- Sri Pulijadi Sithivenajakar Temple, Rambaikulam, Vavuniya
- Sri Thurkkai Amman Temple, Srinagar, Poonthoddam, Vavuniya.
- Vairavar Temple, Kurumankadhu, Vavuniya
- Vairavar Temple, Veethy, Vavuniya
- Veerapaththirar Temple, Sasthirykoolankulam, Vavuniya
- Pandarikulam Sri Muththumari Amman Kovil

== North Central Province ==
=== Polonnaruwa District ===
- Chola period Shiva Temples (Shiva Devala), Polonnaruwa

=== Anuradhapura District ===
- Kathiresan Temple, Anuradhapura

== North Western Province ==
=== Kurunegala District ===
- Sri Muththumari Amman Temple, Mawattegama
- Sri Muththumari Amman Temple, Thelvidda
- Sri Selva Vinayagar Temple, Kurunegala
- Sri Sivasubramanir Temple (Kuliapitty Temple), Pallapitty

=== Puttalam District ===
- Munneswaram temple, Munneswaram
- Sivan Temple, Maanavari, Rajakathaluwai
- Sri thirowpathai amman kovil, Kudiyiruppu, Mundel
- Sri raakkurushi amman kovil, Kudiyiruppu, Mundel
- Sri rukmani saththiyapaamaa sametha sri paarththa saarathi Sri thirowpathaiamman thevashthaanam, Udappu
- Sri veerapathra kaliyamman Kovil, Udappu
- Sri Muththumariyamman kovil, Udappu
- Sri Aadhi Naagathampiraan temple, Selvapuram, Udappu

== Sabaragamuwa Province ==
=== Kegalle District ===
- Sri Kalpandara Temple, Ambanpattiya, Kegalle
- Sri Kathirvelautha Swamy Temple, Kegalle
- Sri Kathirvelautha Swamy Temple, Parakkaduvai
- Sri Mahavishnu Temple, Parakkaduvai
- Sri Muththumariyamman Temple, Puwakpitya

=== Ratnapura District ===
- Sri Kanageswara Temple, Gangoda, Rakwana
- Srimath Thiripurasundari Ambiga Sameda Ratnasabesar, Ratnapura
- Sri Muththumariyamman Temple, Rakwana

== Southern Province ==
=== Galle District ===
- Galle Sivan Temple (Sri Meenadchi Antheswarar Temple), Galle
- Sri Kathirvelayutha Swami Temple (Kathiresan Temple), Kaluwella, Galle
- Sri Muthumari Amman Temple, Alpitiya
- Sri Muthumari Amman Temple, Nakiyadeniya, Galle

=== Hambantota District ===
- Sri Kathiresan Temple, Hambantota

=== Matara District ===
- Sithi Vinayagar Temple, Deniyaya
- Sri Mahapathirakali Temple, Veharahena, Matara
- Sri Muthumari Amman Temple, Deniyaya
- Sri Muthumari Amman Temple, Pidapethara
- Tenavaram temple, Dondra Head

== Uva Province ==
=== Badulla District ===
- Hindu Temple, Ledchawattai Thoddam, Viyaluwa
- Sri Sivasubramaniyar Swamy Alayam, Uva Kettawela, Hali Ela
- Sri kathirvelayutha Swamy kovil, Elamane division roebery, Pittamaruwa

=== Monaragala District ===
- Kathirkamam temple, Kataragama

== Western Province ==
=== Colombo District ===
- Panchikawatta Sri Karumaari Amman Temple
- Aishwaraya Lakshmi Amman Temple, Wellawatte
- Arulmihu Nagapoosani, Colombo
- Kadhirkama Velan, Mount Lavinia
- Kathiresan Temple, Colombo
- Maha Kali Amman Temple, Mutwal
- Modara Sivan Temple, Colombo
- Pazaiya Kadhir Velayudha Swamy Temple, Colombo
- Ponnambaleshvarar, Shivakamasundhari, Colombo
- Bhama Rukmani Sameda Sri Partha Sarathi Permal Temple [Sri Krishnan Temple], Colombo
- Puthiya Kadhir Velayudha Swamy Temple, Colombo
- Sivan Temple, Ratmalana
- Sri Anjaneyar Kovil, Mount Lavinia
- Sri Aatheparaasakthi Temple, Colombo
- Sri Durka Temple, Colombo
- Sri Iyswariya Luxmi Temple, Colombo
- Sri Kailasanatha Swamy Temple, Colombo
- Sri Karumari Amman Temple, Kolonnawa
- Sri Koneshwari Maha Davi Temple, Colombo
- Sri Munneswarar Temple, Sri Bodhiraja Mattta, Colombo
- Sri Munneswarar Swamy Temple, Bandaranayake Mawatha, Colombo
- Sri Muthumari Amman Temple, Puwakpitiya
- Sri Papathi Amman Temple, Colombo
- Sri Ponnambalavaneswarar Temple, Colombo
- Sri Sivalingaperuman and Sri Kathirgma Temple, Ratmalana
- Sri Visnu Temple, Colombo
- Sri Vekkali Amman Temple, Jampettah St, Colombo 13
- Subramaniya Swamy Temple, Colombo
- Ubaya Kadhirkamam, Bambalapitti, Colombo
- Ubaya Kadhirkamam, Vellavaththai, Colombo
- Vinayakar Temple, Colombo

=== Gampaha District ===
- Muththumari Amman Temple, Negombo
- Sri Muthu Kumaran Temple, Hunupitiya, Wattala
- Sri Poopala Vinayagar Temple, Peliyagoda
- Sri Somasundareswar Swamy Temple, Paliyagoda
- Sri Sithi Vinayagar Temple, Negombo
- Sri Siva Subramaniya Swami Temple, Wattala

=== Kalutara District ===
- Amman Temple, Maahama
- Kathirvelautha Swami Temple, Kalutara
- Sri Kanthaswami Temple, Panadura
- Sri Muthumari Amman Temple, Ingiriya
- Sri Muthumari Amman Temple, Pathurelia, Kalutara
- Sri Muthumari Amman Temple, Eladuwa
- Sri Muthumari Amman Temple, Miriswatta Estate, Welipenna

== Destruction ==
Hindu temples, particularly in the Northern and Eastern provinces of Sri Lanka, have faced destruction and desecration by European powers during the Transitional, Kandyan and British Ceylon periods. The arrival of the Portuguese, Dutch and British colonial powers led to the demolition, looting and repurposing of many Hindu temples.

=== The Portuguese ===
==== Nallur Kandaswamy temple ====
The Nallur Kandaswamy temple, located in Jaffna, was originally founded in 948 AD. It gained fame in the 13th century when it was rebuilt by Puvaneka Vaahu, a minister of the Jaffna King Kalinga Maha. The temple underwent a third reconstruction by Senpaha Perumal (also known as Sapumal Kumaraya), the adopted son of the Kotte king. During this time, Nallur served as the capital of the Jaffna Kingdom and housed various courtly buildings, palaces and businesses.

The third temple was destroyed in 1624 by the Portuguese, who built several churches over its ruins. The site of the original temple is now occupied by St. James' Church, Nallur. Although part of the original temple's Sivalingam survived, it was destroyed during the Sri Lankan civil war and only the platform on which it was mounted remains. The current temple was rebuilt in 1734 by Don Juan and underwent renovations in the 1890s to restore it.

==== Koneswaram temple ====
The Koneswaram temple, located in Trincomalee, is one of the most revered Hindu temples in Sri Lanka. On April 14, 1622, during the Tamil New Year, the Portuguese destroyed the temple. The Portuguese general Constantino de Sá de Noronha led the assault, with soldiers disguising themselves as Iyer priests to gain entry. The treasures of the temple were looted and lost, although the Dutch and British who came subsequently allowed the rebuilding of the temple.

In the aftermath, the Portuguese repurposed the temple's carved stones to construct Fort Fredrick. Churches were also built in the town to assert religious superiority. The main deity statue was taken to the town, and some statues were buried by fleeing priests.

==== Naguleswaram temple ====
Naguleswaram temple, situated in Keerimalai, Jaffna, is one of the ancient Ishwarams dedicated to Lord Shiva. It was subjected to destruction during the Portuguese colonial period when missionaries became active in Sri Lanka. Despite this, the temple was rebuilt in 1894 and continues to be a place of worship today.

==== Munneswaram temple, Chilaw ====
The Munneswaram temple, located in the western province of Chilaw, was also targeted and damaged by the Portuguese, who completely destroyed the temple in 1578, excepting the basement, atop which a Catholic chapel was built. After the temple was destroyed, it was rebuilt by Rajasinha I, but was demolished again by the Portuguese and was rebuilt by locals. Today, it remains an active place of worship.

==== Thiruketheeswaram temple, Mannar ====
Thiruketheeswaram temple is located in Mannar. It was also targeted during the Portuguese colonial rule, resulting in damage and looting of its treasures. The temple, like others affected, underwent reconstruction in the early 20th century.

== See also ==
- Lists of Hindu temples
