= Captain Mayuran (Saba) =

Sri Lankan Tamil militant

- கப்டன் மயூரன் (சபா)
- Born: Balasabapathy Thiyagarajah; 1 September 1970
- Died: 11 November 1993 (aged 23); Point Pedro
- Years active: 1986–1993
- Organization: Liberation Tigers of Tamil Eelam
- Relatives: Captain Mayuran (Saba) was the brother of Captain Morris (M.O), a fellow LTTE commander who was responsible for the Point Pedro District.
- Military service
- Captain Mayuran (front row, second from right) with Velupillai Prabhakaran, 1988
- Allegiance: Tamil Eelam
- Branch: Liberation Tigers of Tamil Eelam
- Commands: Special bodyguard of the LTTE leader Velupillai Prabhakaran
- Conflicts: Sri Lankan Civil War: Eelam War I, between 1985 and 1987; Indian intervention in the Sri Lankan Civil War, between 1987 and 1990; Eelam War II, between 1990 and 1995

Captain Mayuran (right) with LTTE leader Velupillai Prabhakaran and his family

Balasabapathy Thiyagarajah (Tamil: பாலசபாபதி தியாகராஜா), commonly known as Captain Mayuran (Tamil: கப்டன் மயூரன்) (1 November 1970 – 11 November 1993), was a member of the Liberation Tigers of Tamil Eelam (LTTE). He served as a security officer for LTTE leader Velupillai Prabhakaran and participated in various military operations during the Sri Lankan Civil War.

== Early life and education ==
Balasabapathy Thiyagarajah was born on 1 November 1970, the son of M. S. Thiyagarajah and Sivagamasunthary from Puloly west near Point Pedro in northern Sri Lanka. He was educated at Vadamarachchi Hindu Girls' College, Point Pedro and later at Hartley College, Point Pedro, Sri Lanka.

== LTTE involvement ==
Captain Mayuran was born in Arthiyadi, near Point Pedro, in the Jaffna District, Sri Lanka. He joined the LTTE in 1987 at the age 17 and was trained in security operations and military tactics. Over time, he became a senior security officer within LTTE Leader Veluppillai Prabhakaran´s protection unit.

== Military ==
Mayuran was involved in LTTE military operations, including the Battle of Pooneryn in November 1993, where the LTTE fought against the Sri Lankan Army (SLA). After his death, the LTTE named a sniper unit after him, known as the Mayuran Sniper Unit, specialising in long-range attacks.

== Death ==
Mayuran was reportedly killed on 11 November 1993, during the Battle of Pooneryn. However, his body was never recovered, and the exact circumstances of his death remain unclear.

== See also ==
- Velupillai Prabhakaran
- Liberation Tigers of Tamil Eelam (LTTE)
- Sri Lankan Civil War
- Battle of Pooneryn (1993)
