= Puloly =

Puloly புலோலி Pachimapulavargananagaram
- Village
- Location within Northern Province
- Coordinates: 9°48′0″N 80°13′0″E
- Country: Sri Lanka
- Province: Northern
- District: Jaffna
- DS Division: Vadamarachchi North

Puloly (Tamil: புலோலி, romanized: Pulōli) is a region in Jaffna Peninsula, Northern Sri Lanka. It is located approximately 30 km from City of Jaffna. Its north part is Point Pedro town. Some scholars suggest that region was named after several scholars lived there (meaning of "pulavar oli"). Puloly is home to many historical sites such as Point Pedro harbor and Vallipuram temple. Puloly has a number education institutions founded such as Hartley College, Methodist Girls High School, Velautham Maha Vidiyalayam and Vadamarachchi Hindu girls school.

== See also ==
- Point Pedro
- Ubayakathirgamam
- Vallipuram
