= Captain Morris (M.O) =

Sri Lankan Tamil militant

- கப்டன் மொறிஸ்
- Captain Morris, in a photograph published by Eelamurasu Weekly in November 2000
- Born: Paratharajan Thiyagarajah; 12 September 1969
- Died: 1 May 1989 (aged 19); Point Pedro
- Other name: MO
- Years active: 1984–1989
- Organization: Liberation Tigers of Tamil Eelam
- Relatives: Captain Mayuran (Saba) (brother)
- Military service
- Allegiance: Tamil Eelam
- Branch: Liberation Tigers of Tamil Eelam
- Commands: LTTE's commander for Point Pedro District
- Conflicts: Sri Lankan Civil War: Eelam War I, between 1985 and 1987; Indian intervention in the Sri Lankan Civil War, between 1987 and 1990

Paratharajan Thiyagarajah (12 September 1969 – 1 May 1989; Tamil: பரதராஜன் தியாகராஜா), known by his nom de guerre Captain Morris (M.O. - MINES OPERATER), was a Tamil militant and regional commander of the Liberation Tigers of Tamil Eelam (LTTE). He was active in the Northern Province of Sri Lanka, particularly in the Point Pedro (Paruthithurai) region, where he held significant responsibilities during the Sri Lankan Civil War.

== Early life ==
Paratharajan Thiagarajah was born on 12 September 1969, in Arthiyadi, Puloly West, Point Pedro, in the Jaffna District of Sri Lanka. He was the son of M. S. Thiyagarajah & Sivagamasunthary. His father was a Station Master (SM) working Ceylon government Railway.

== Involvement with the LTTE ==
Captain Morris joined the Liberation Tigers of Tamil Eelam (LTTE) in 1984, at the age of 15. Within a few years, he was appointed as the LTTE's regional commander for Point Pedro, a strategically important coastal town.

Captain Morris was an early mentor to Colonel Charles, who later became the head of the LTTE intelligence unit. The two worked closely together, particularly during the battles against the Indian Peacekeeping Force (IPKF) in the late 1980s.

== Death ==
On 1 May 1989, Captain Morris was killed in combat during an engagement with the Indian Peace Keeping Force (IPKF) in Point Pedro. Eelanatham later described his death as a significant loss for the LTTE.
