= Ubayakathirgamam =

- Ubayakathirgamam Sri Chakkara Shanmugar Alayam
- The Chakkara Yantra in Ubayakathirgamam.

Religion
- Affiliation: Hinduism
- District: Jaffna
- Deity: Lord Murugan

Location
- Country: Sri Lanka

Ubayakathirgamam is a temple dedicated to the Hindu god Muruga, who is worshipped as presiding deity of Kali Yuga. The prefix Ubaya- means "second" or "sub" in Tamil. Hence the temple got its name, as it is considered to be a second Kathirgamam (Kataragama) of the country. This temple is in Puloly in the Jaffna Peninsula of Sri Lanka.

== Location ==
Ubayakathirgamam can be reached by taking a walk through Vallipuram Road, from Manthikai Junction, which is on the Point Pedro - Jaffna Road. A Vinayagar temple named Periyadevanatthay Alayam is also situated beside Ubayakathirgamam. Devotees from Puloly and Point Pedro come regularly to the daily Poojas. During the Karthikai Star on the month of Karthikai, the temple will be filled by devotees from all over the country for its Camphor Festival. It should also be noted that the Theertham festival falls on a Thiruvona Star, close upon to the Theertham festival of Kataragama temple.

== How to reach ==
The temple is at a distance of 31.7 km from Jaffna Railway station. One has to drive from Jaffna towards Point Pedro, via Nelliyady and Manthikai junction. The temple is at 1.7 km from the Manthikai (Manthigai) Government Hospital.

== Temple timings ==
On normal days, the morning puja is performed at 7:00 am. Temple is open for devotees from 07:00 to around 12:00 noon. Evening puja is performed by around 05:00 pm and the temple is open for devotees from 05:00 to 08:00 pm.

== Moolavar ==
Ubayakathirgamam Moolavar is a Chakkara Yantra, which appeared on a white rock itself. As unlike in other temples of Muruga, the Moola Linga is in the form of a Chakkara Yantra, hence the temple got its name "Ubayakathirgamam Sri Chakkara Shanmugar Alayam". The noticeable feature of this Chakkara Yantra is it was not made by hand of man. It is a Suyambu Linga, the Holy one revealing himself in nature on the white rock. There are a few projections and letters representing God Vinayagar and the Shakties of Siva, to the right of the yantra. The Wood apple tree, which is also said to have divine power as the Thala Viruksha of the temple, is named as Vilatheeswaran.

== History ==
This temple was discovered and named Ubayakathirgamam by Lady T.S.Logambal devotee of Muruga, who hails from Tirunelveli, a city in Tamil Nadu. The Lady Logambal publication mentions that in the year 1909, God Muruga appeared in a dream to Lady Logambal and informed the existence of the Chakkara Yantra on the surface of a rock by the side of a wood apple tree at Pachchima Pulavar Kana Nagaram. He told her to draw a picture of the yantra and keep it with her for her daily prayers. It was impossible for her to locate the village which was in Sri Lanka (then named as Ceylon), as she is an Indian.

In year 1911, Muruga informed her in her dream that the place is in the Jaffna Peninsula of Ceylon. The scholars in Jaffna informed her that Puloly is the Tamil equivalent of the above-mentioned Nagaram, which was named in Sanskrit. After reaching Jaffna, she succeeded in discovering the holy site, in a Visakha day in the month of Vaikasi, which is according to Skanda Purana, the birth day of God Muruga.

It was year 1924, after a long period, God Muruga instructed in her dream that the Yantra of the temple is, as appeared by itself, has the strong power than the other temples and will give divine favours to the devotees. So it again became a duty of Lady Logambal to spread the message to the devotees in Ceylon.

In a leaflet printed and published on 25 July 1924, Lady Logambal clearly instructed the people of the village South Puloly the power of the temple and its Chakkara as informed to her God Muruga. It is mentioned in the pamphlet that there must have been a famous temple at this site in olden days and that it had come to ruins.

== The Temple’s Divine Power ==
The Yantra drawn up by Muthulinga Swamigal at Kathirgamam is considered a major reason for the divine grace of Kathirgamam. Similarly since the appearance of Ubayakathirgamam to the villagers, with the guidance of Lady Logambal, the temple was a miracle for the villagers. It is so common to hear from the villagers, mentioning the wishes those were fulfilled by worshiping the temple and its Chakkara Yantra.

It is also mentioned that once when the people were not knowledgeable regarding the Yantra, the white rock where the Suyambu Linga appeared in nature was tried to be removed to build a Vinayagar Temple nearby. In spite of seven explosions by Subramaniam, an experienced man in blasting rocks, the rock was safe without any damage. This was known as a miracle and the rock and the wood apple tree on it were assumed to be having super natural powers, by the villagers.

Devotees from all over the country go to this temple to worship Sri Chakkara Shanmugar and Vilatheeswaran and fulfill their wishes.

== See also ==
- Hinduism in Sri Lanka
- Katirkamam (Hindu temple)
