= Ariyalai Siddhivinayakar Temple =

Hindu Temple

Coordinates: 9°39′33.32″N 80°2′51.01″E

Ariyalai Sithivinayakar Temple or Sithivinayakar Kovil is an ancient temple located about 100 metres (330 ft) west of A9 Road, around 5 kilometres (3.1 mi) from Jaffna Town. This was rehabilitated by Advocate Arulampalam circa 1918. This temple was visited by Mahama Gandi, Yogar Swami, Kunrakudi Adakal.

This temple land are being used as Sri Parvadhi Vidyasalai (School), Market, Agrarian Centre, Sidda Medicine centre, Now defunct Multipurpose Cooperative Society, Handloom center and Preschool.
