= Sri Muthumariamman Temple, Matale =

Hindu temple in Sri Lanka

Muthumariamman Temple
- ஸ்ரீ முத்துமாரியம்மன் கோவில்
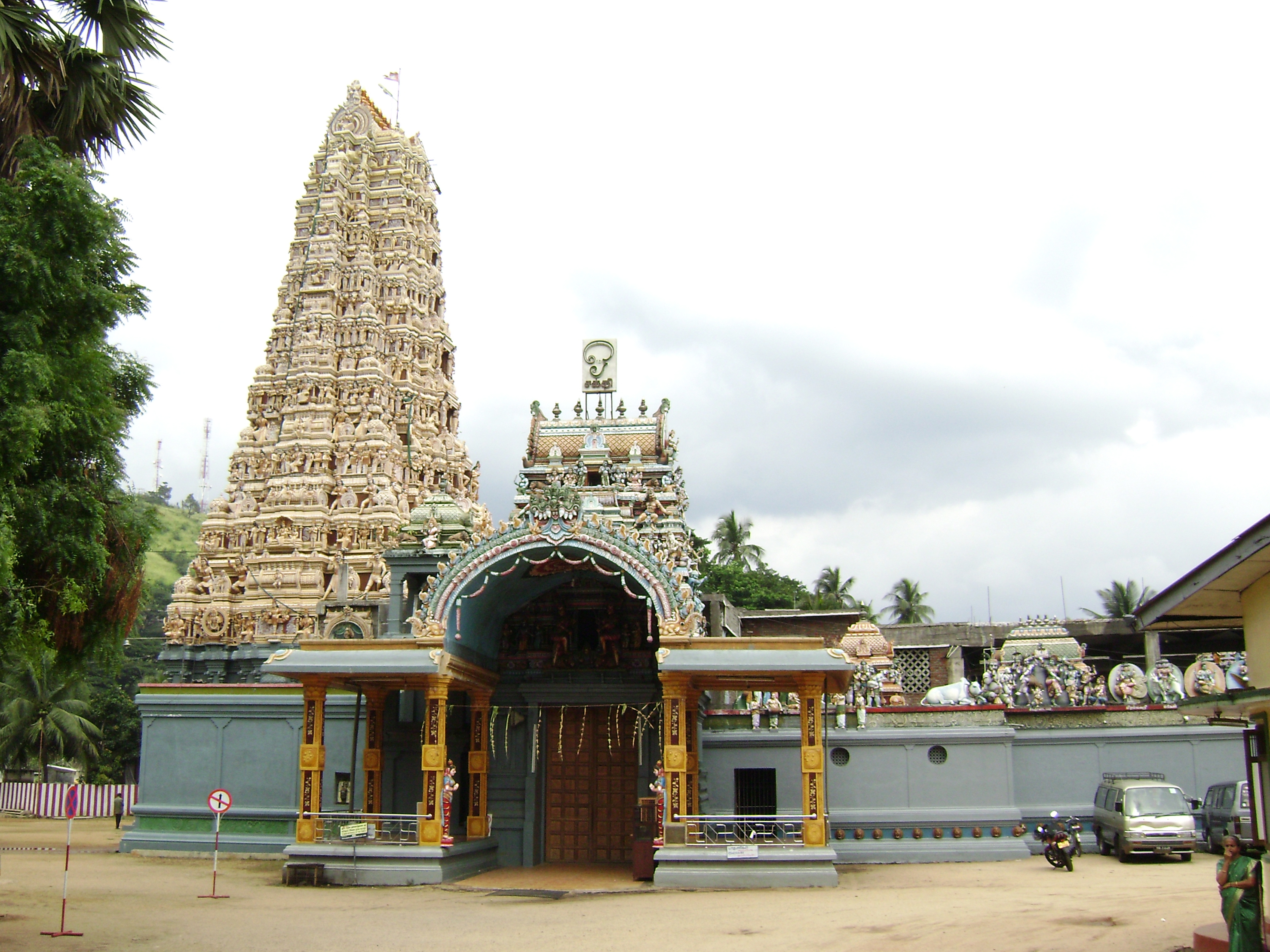
- Muthumariamman Temple in Matale, Sri Lanka.

- Location in Sri Lanka

Religion
- Affiliation: Hinduism
- District: Matale District
- Province: Central Province
- Deity: Muthumariamman

Location
- Location: Matale
- Country: Sri Lanka
- Coordinates: 7°28′35.9″N 80°37′21.4″E

Architecture
- Type: Dravidian Architecture
- Creator: Nattukottai Nagarathar (Chettiar)
- Completed: 1874

Website
- www.matalesmt.org

Muthumariamman Temple (Tamil: முத்து மாரியம்மன் கோவில்) or Arulmigu Sri Muthumari Amman Kovil is a Hindu temple in Matale, Sri Lanka.

The prefix "muthu" literally means pearl. "Mari" means rain and "Amman" means mother in Tamil language. The temple is dedicated to Mariamman, the goddess of rain and fertility. The chariot festival in this temple is held usually coinciding with Magam on a Full Moon Poya Day.

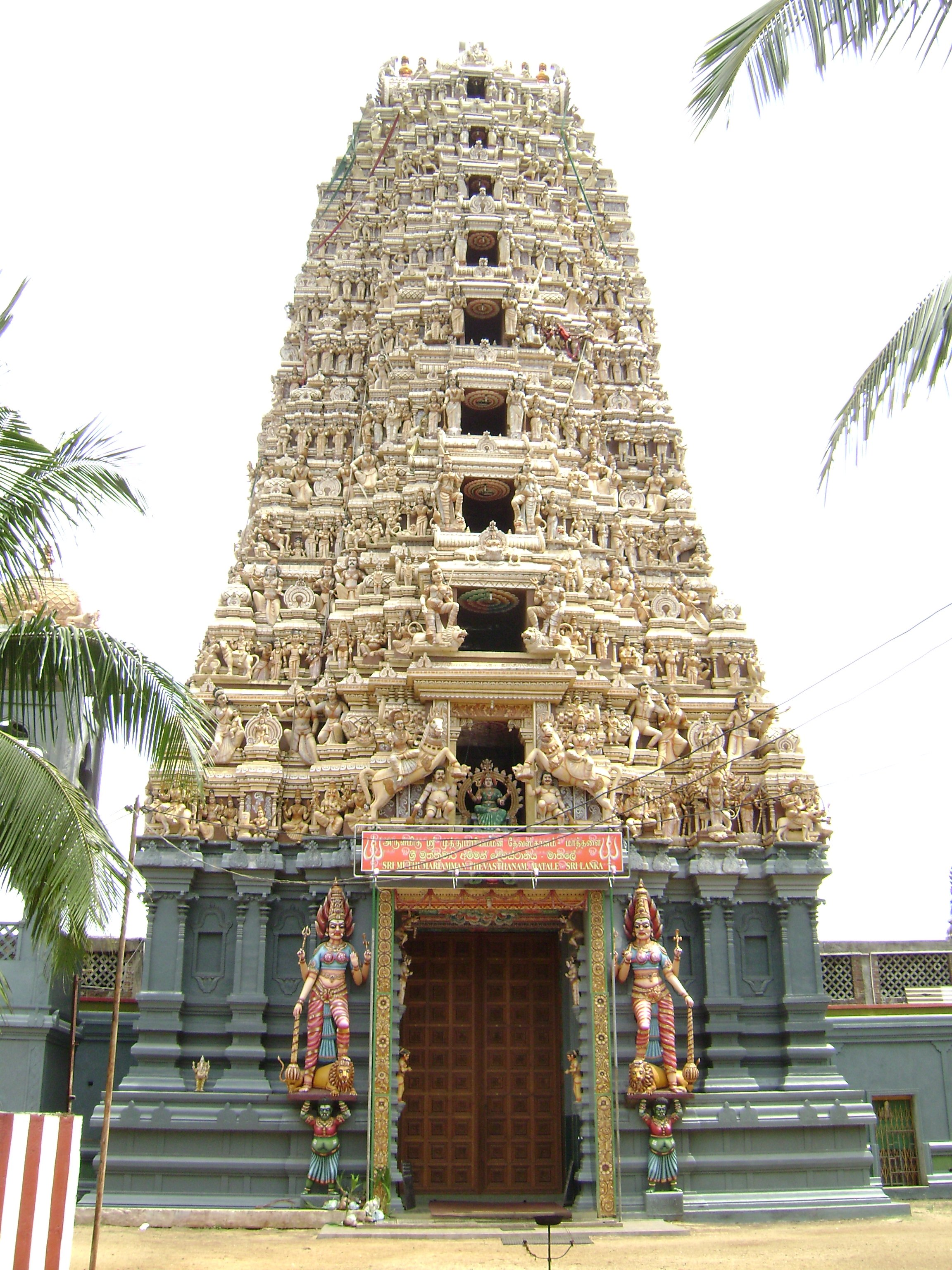
108ft height Rajagopuram

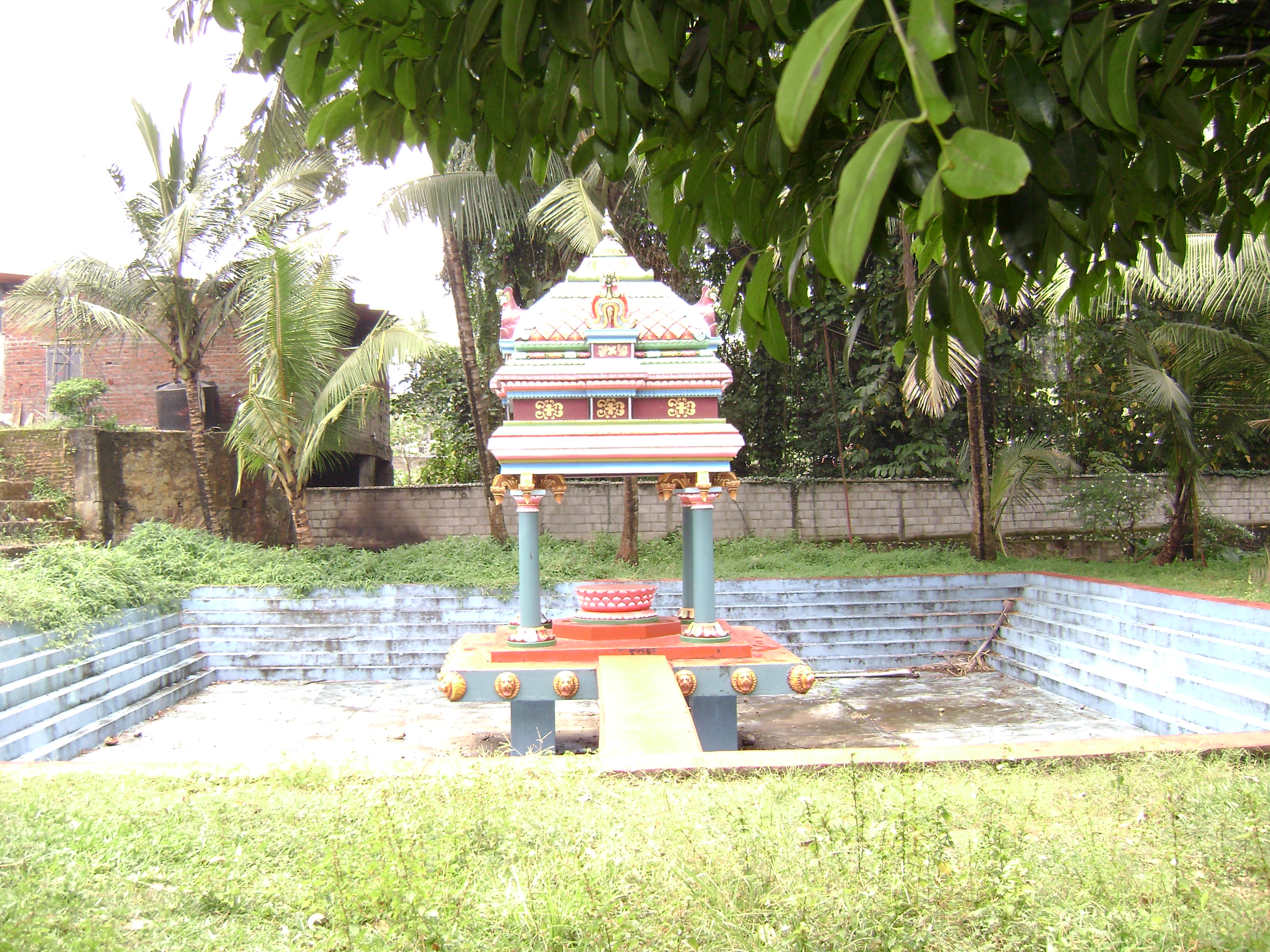
Theerththa Kerni

== History ==
The land was originally part of a paddy field and was gifted by the owner in 1852.

The current temple was built in 1874, funded by the Nattukkottai Chettiar. This temple is used by Hindus. The temple was originally a small statue under a tree prayed to by the Hindu people but has been developed by the people in Matale. The first Kumbhabhishekham of the temple was held in 1960.

The temple was severely damaged during the anti-Tamil riots in July 1983 but was subsequently restored. One of the visually dominant features of this temple is its 32.9 m (108 ft) high Gopuram ('Raja Koburum'), a large decorated tower located above the main northern gateway ('Vadakku Vaayil') to the temple. The Raja Koburum is one of the largest Gopurams in Sri Lanka. The 1008 statues of Hindu deities are the work of South Indian sculptor, Nagalingam and his son Ramanathan, with the help of about 100 designers, painters and architects from Tamil Nadu and Sri Lanka. The Raja Koburum was completed in 2007 at the cost of approximately Rs 150M.

== Special events ==
The main religious festivals including the chariot festival at the temple are celebrated during February or March on an annual basis.

The temple has five ornate chariots, which are used to convey statues of Hindu deities around the city on 'Ther' or 'Vettai Thiruvizha', the chariot ceremony day, which is held the day before 'Medin Poya' (the Poya day in March). Ganesha, Shiva, Mahadevi, Murugan and Chandeshvara Nayanar are the five prominent statues of Hindu deities which are carried by devotees in the chariot festival.

== Wedding hall ==
There is a large wedding hall for the Hindu people. This wedding hall has been in use from 1856 to the present.

== See also ==
- List of Hindu temples in Sri Lanka
- Matale District
- Mariamman
- Karuppuswamy
