= Maha Kali Amman Temple, Mutwal =

Hindu temple in Colombo, Sri Lanka

Maha Kali Amman Temple
- Location in Sri Lanka

Religion
- Affiliation: Hinduism
- District: Colombo
- Province: Western
- Deity: Mahakali

Location
- Location: Mutwal
- Country: Sri Lanka
- Interactive map of Maha Kali Amman Temple
- Coordinates: 06°58′02.8″N 79°52′00.6″E

Architecture
- Type: Dravidian architecture
- Completed: 17-18th century

Maha Kali Amman Temple is a Hindu temple situated in Mutwal, in Colombo, Sri Lanka. It is dedicated to Mahakali, the Hindu goddess of destruction and doomsday. The temple is believed to have been in existence since the Dutch Period (17-18 centuries A.D.). The main festival of the temple is held in January every year.

== See also ==
- Hinduism in Sri Lanka
