= Kovitkadavai =

Tamil Hindu temple in Jaffna, Sri Lanka

Kovitkadavai is a Pillaiyar temple, which is located in Thunnalai, Jaffna, Sri Lanka.
