= Vadamarachchi Hindu Girls' College =

- வடமராட்சி இந்து மகளிர் கல்லூரி

Location
- Point Pedro, Jaffna District, Northern Province; Sri Lanka; 9°49′01.80″N 80°13′5.50″E

Information
- School type: Public provincial 1AB
- School district: Vadamarachchi Education Zone
- Authority: Northern Provincial Council
- School number: 1007020
- Teaching staff: 69
- Grades: 1-13
- Gender: Girls
- Age range: 5-18

Vadamarachchi Hindu Girls' College (Tamil: வடமராட்சி இந்து மகளிர் கல்லூரி Vaṭamarāṭci Intu Makaḷir Kallūri) is a provincial school in Point Pedro, Sri Lanka.

== See also ==
- List of schools in Northern Province, Sri Lanka
