= Thambiluvil Sri Sivalinga Pillayar Temple =

Thambiluvil Sri Sivalingapillaiyar Temple
- தம்பிலுவில் ஸ்ரீ சிவலிங்க பிள்ளையார் ஆலயம்

Religion
- Affiliation: Hinduism
- District: Ampara District
- Deity: Lord Ganesha (Sri Sivalingapillaiyar)
- Festival: Aani Uttaram Theertha Utsavam

Location
- Location: Thambiluvil
- State: Eastern Province
- Country: Sri Lanka

Architecture
- Type: Dravidian architecture
- Completed: 1931 (origin), rebuilt after 2004 tsunami

Thambiluvil Sri Sivalingapillaiyar Temple (Tamil: தம்பிலுவில் ஸ்ரீ சிவலிங்க பிள்ளையார் ஆலயம்) is a Hindu temple located in the village of Thambiluvil in the Ampara District of Eastern Province, Sri Lanka. It is one of the important temples dedicated to Lord Ganesha in the region and is locally regarded for its connection with the nearby area of Kaluthavalai.

== Location ==
The temple is situated on a sandy elevation adjoining the open plains of Kandankuda, south of Thambiluvil village in the Thirukkovil administrative division. Travellers along the main coastal road often stop to worship Lord Ganesha for safe and prosperous journeys, offering dakshina and coins in the temple’s donation box — a long-standing devotional practice.

== Historical background ==
According to local tradition, around 1931 an Indian engineer working on a nearby construction project had a child who was born mute. Hearing of the miraculous powers of the deity worshipped at Kaluthavalai, he vowed to perform a pongal offering to Lord Pillaiyar if his child gained speech.

It is said that the child miraculously began to speak through the blessings of the deity. The engineer prepared offerings, but heavy rains and flooding prevented travel to the temple. In a dream, a divine figure appeared and said:

“Do not worry. Offer worship and pongal beneath that tree, placing a stone sanctified with sea water — I dwell there.”

Following this vision, the engineer purified a large seashore stone, placed it under a thuvurai tree near the current site, and performed the pongal and pooja. Since many Kaluthavalai villagers had also worked at that project site, and the vow was fulfilled there, the location came to be known as Kaluthavalai Pillaiyar.

== Development ==
A devotee named Mudumonthan Mozhi Suyambu Narayanan from Nalukkal Taluk, Tirunelveli District, South India, constructed a small shrine and performed the temple’s Kumbhabhishekam (consecration) on 26 June 1971. He maintained the temple for several years, during which the annual Aani Uttaram Theertha Utsavam festival began and continues to this day.

Before returning to India, Narayanan entruste
