= Aishwaraya Lakshmi Amman Temple, Wellawatte =

Coordinates: 6.86509°N 79.86210°E

Aishwarya Lakshmi Amman Kovil is a Hindu Temple located in the Colombo District, Wellawatte, western province Sri Lanka.
