= Vallipuram =

Vallipuram வல்லிபுரம் වල්ලිපුරම
- Town
- Location within Northern Province
- Coordinates: 9°47′0″N 80°14′0″E
- Country: Sri Lanka
- Province: Northern
- District: Jaffna
- DS Division: Vadamarachchi North

Population
  - Total: 596

Vallipuram (Tamil: வல்லிபுரம், romanized: Vallipuram, Sinhala: වල්ලිපුරම, romanized: Vallipurama) is a village in Vadamarachchi, near Point Pedro in Northern Province, Sri Lanka. The village is an ancient settlement with rich archeological remains. The village is home to the Vishnu temple Vallipuram Aalvar Kovil.

== History ==
A 2nd century gold plate carrying a Prakrit inscription was found under the foundation of the Vishnu Hindu temple at Vallipuram. It mentions about the establishment of a Vihara in Nakadiva by the minister named Isigiraya under the ruler King Vaha who is identified as King Vasabha (67-111 C.E.). The inscription is important as it confirms that King Vasabha was ruling the whole country including Nakadiva (According to Malini Dias, Nakadiva in Old Sinhala is the equivalent of Pali Nagadipa, (Note: The inscription documented during the reign of King Vasabha records the building of a vihara or a monastery at a place called Badakara Atana by a person named Piyagukatisa, when the minister Isigiraya as the Governor of Nagadipa. Nakadiva in Old Sinhala is the equivalent of Pali Nagadipa. The gold plate bearing the inscription was discovered under the foundation of the Vishnu temple at Vallipuram in the Vadamarachchi Divisional Secretariat in Jaffna where remains the ruins of buildings of an early Buddhist civilization that flourished in the Northern part of Sri Lanka. According to the inscription, the fact that the King had a minister controlling the North in his reign, confirms that the whole of Sri Lanka was under King Vasabha) whilst the use of the phoneme 'k' to represent 'g' reveals Dravidian influence). (Note: "The term Nakadiva in the script is partially Tamilised. It is an intermediate form between the Pali Nagadipa and the Tamil form Nakativu.") (Note: "Senarat Paranavitana correctly identifies Nakadiva with the Pali Nagadipa. The present writer feels that this form is partially Tamilised and is an intermediate form between the Pali form and the fully Tamilised form of Nakativu.") (Note: "Another feature that Sri Lankan Prakrit shares with Tamil is the interchangeability of ka and ga sounds. The word naka used in place of naga in this inscription itself exemplifies this relationship. These features clearly point to the importance of influences emanating from the southern parts of the Indian subcontinent on the development of the variety of Prakrit used in Sri Lanka.")

The language and interpretation of the inscription is disputed. (Note: "Having gone through the words in this inscription and having seen the Tamil background of several terms, we question the statement by Paranavitana that the language is old Sinhalese conforming, in general, to the grammatical standards followed in other documents of that period. We can see that there is a Tamil substratum and that there are some rather crude Prakritisations of Tamil words in the text.") According to Senarath Paranavithana, this is an inscription written in Old Sinhalese. Peter Schalk believes that this inscription is in Prakrit bearing Dravidian influences and that the name Nakadiva is a fiefdom corresponding to modern Jaffna Peninsula, which was ruled under the minister Isikiraya ('raya' being a Tamil form of the word raja, and the place name 'Badakara' (vada karai - Tamil) deriving from the Dravidian 'northern coast').

Vallipuram was an ancient capital of the Northern Kingdoms of Sri Lanka. Point Pedro is the nearest town. Vallipuram is a part of Thunnalai which is a village in eastern vadamarachi. There are two places in India with similar names. One is near Namakkal and the other one is near Kanchi. As such the people in Jaffna and in India have a long term connection. This place is settled by migrants from a town called Vallipuram near Namakkal which is near Coimbatore.Professor Peter Schalk (University of Uppsala), writes "Vallipuram has very rich archaeological remains that point at an early settlement. It was probably an emporium in the first centuries AD. [...]. The Buddha statue found here was given to King of Thailand by the then British Governor Henry Blake in 1906.

== Gallery ==
Vallipuram Gallery
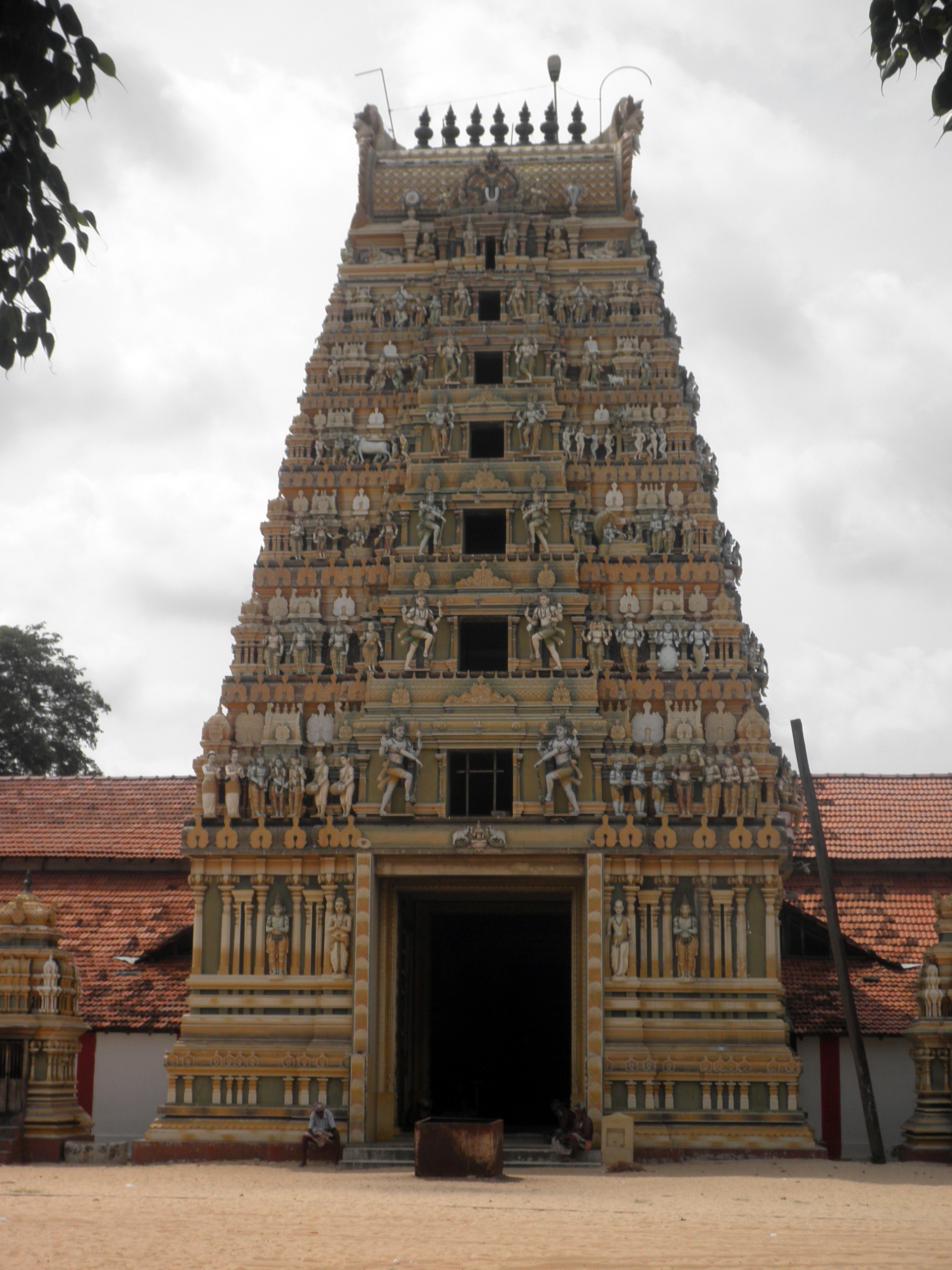
Vallipuram

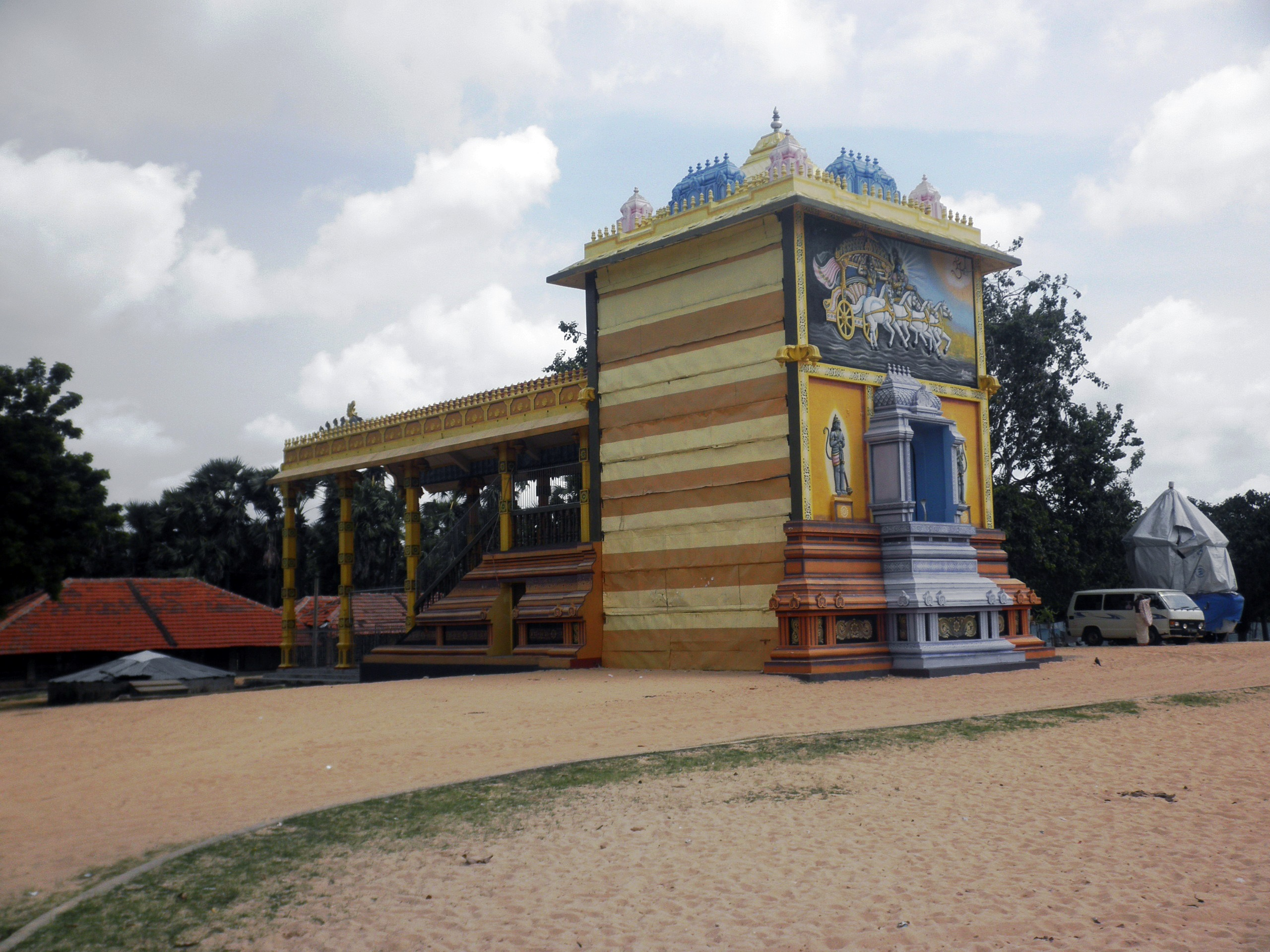
Vishnu temple, Vallipuram

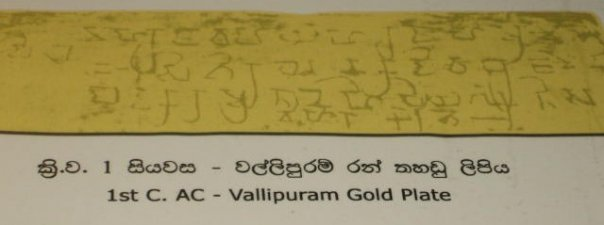
Gold inscription of King Vasaha, Vallipuram
1st century AC Brahmi:"Sidha! Maharaja-Vahayaha rajahi amete Isigiraye Nakadiva Bujameni Badakara-atanehi Piyaguka-Tisa Vihara karite"
Trans: Success! in the reign of the great king Vaha, when the minister Isigiraya was governing the Nakadiva, Piyaguka Tissa caused a Vihara to be built at Badakara Atana.

== See also ==
- Kantharodai
- Nallur (Jaffna)
- Naguleswaram temple
- Nainativu
- Ubayakathirgamam
