= Ariyalai =

Ariyalai அரியாலை අරියාලෙයි
- Suburb
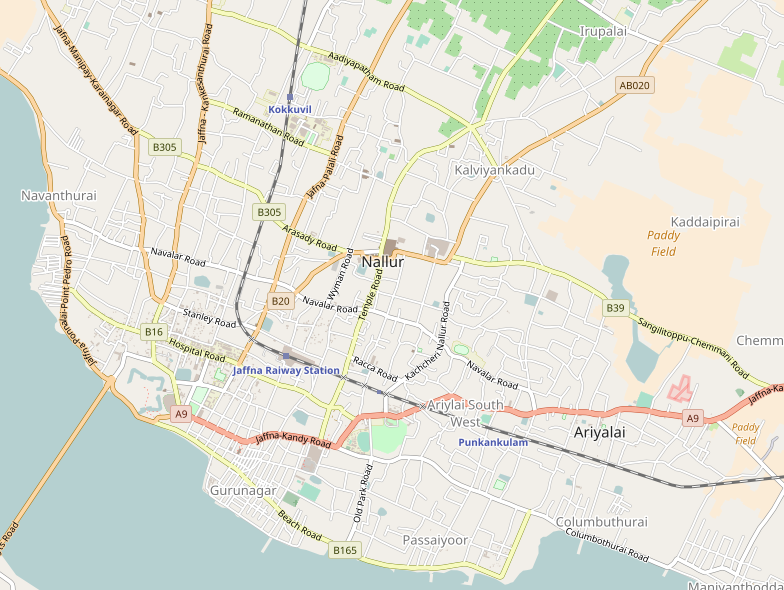
- Location within Greater Jaffna Location within Northern Province
- Coordinates: 9°39′38.70″N 80°02′31.60″E
- Country: Sri Lanka
- Province: Northern
- District: Jaffna
- DS Division: Nallur

Government
  - Type: Municipal Council & Divisional Council
  - Body: Jaffna & Nallur

Population (2012)
  - Total: 10,750
- Time zone: UTC+5:30 (Sri Lanka Standard Time Zone)
- Post Codes: 4133005-4133040
- Telephone Codes: 021
- Vehicle registration: NP

Ariyalai (Tamil: அரியாலை, romanized: Ariyālai; Sinhala: අරියාලෙයි Ariyāleyi) is a suburb of the city of Jaffna in northern Sri Lanka. The suburb is divided into eight village officer divisions whose combined population was 10,750 at the 2012 census.
