= Point Pedro =

Point Pedro பருத்தித்துறை පේදුරු තුඩුව
- Town
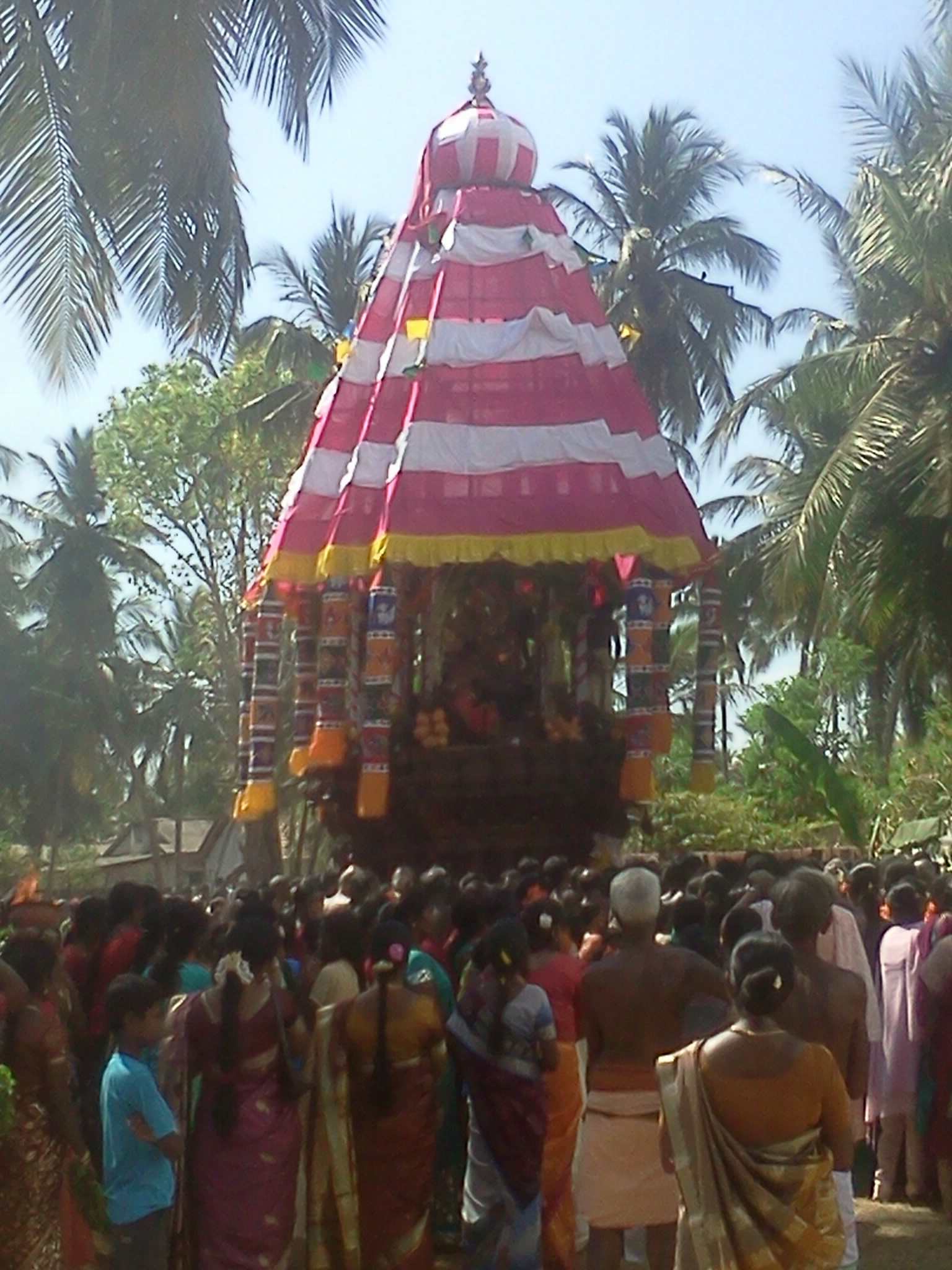
- Sandika Amman Parameswari Temple, Point Pedro

- Location within Northern Province
- Coordinates: 9°49′0″N 80°14′0″E
- Country: Sri Lanka
- Province: Northern
- District: Jaffna
- DS Division: Vadamarachchi North

Government
  - Type: Urban Council
  - Chairman: Sabanayagam Raveenthiran (TNA)

Area
  - Total: 11.65 km^{2} (4.50 sq mi)

Population (2011)
  - Total: 31,351
  - Density: 1,044/km^{2} (2,700/sq mi)
- Time zone: UTC+5:30 (Sri Lanka Standard Time Zone)

Point Pedro, also known as Paruthithurai (Tamil: பருத்தித்துறை, romanized: Paruttittuṟai; Sinhala: පේදුරු තුඩුව, romanized: Pēduru Tuḍuva) is a town, located in Jaffna District, Sri Lanka, at the northernmost point of the island.

Cotton is produced around Point Pedro in the fertile calcic red latosol soils. The eastern coast of Point Pedro forms a 3 mile wide, 20 mile long beach with sand dunes up to 100 feet high, extending to Thalayady. The porous soil has a water table deep underground with an estimated one billion litres of fresh water. The Boxing Day tsunami of 2004 raised the salt content of the ground water. The tsunami destroyed parts of the town and submerged some parts with seawater up to 4 feet deep.

The town came briefly under the control of the Tamil Tigers (LTTE) during the early 1990s, until the Sri Lankan Army recaptured it in 1995.

== Etymology ==
The place name of Point Pedro is a corruption of the Portuguese "Ponta das Pedras" meaning "the rocky cape". The name of the town in Tamil is Paruthithurai, which translates to "Cotton Harbour". The harbour exported cotton to South India for centuries.

== History ==
=== Ancient history ===
Vallipuram, a village nearby was an ancient settlement with rich archaeological remains. During pre-colonial and colonial times Point Pedro was a trading port. There is a large number of people in and around Point Pedro who trace their families to local traders, called Sambangarar, 'சம்பாங்காரர்' in Tamil, meaning 'ship people'.

=== Portuguese history ===
There are several Catholic churches built around Point Pedro along the coasts and in Nelliady. Sacred Heart College is a major Catholic high school situated in Nelliady.

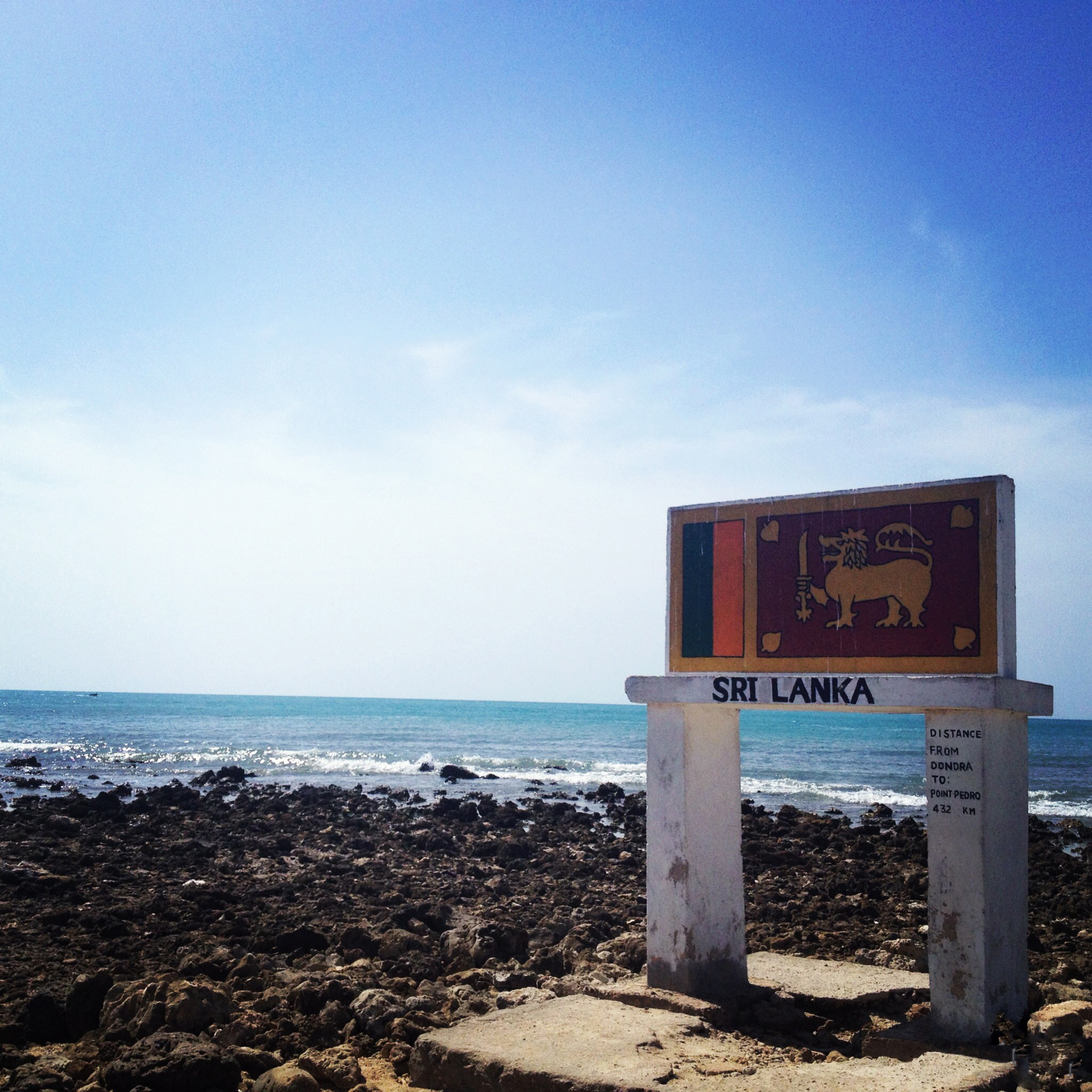
Point Pedro- Northernmost point of Sri Lanka

=== Dutch colonial history ===
In the 17th century Philippus Baldaeus, a Christian missionary from the Netherlands, settled in Jaffna following the Dutch occupation of Ceylon. He documented the lives and customs of the Tamil people of Northern Ceylon. His studies were published in the Netherlands and later in Germany. In Point Pedro's market there is a stone inscription commemorating Baldeus giving lessons from the Bible under a tamarind tree. The tree was uprooted by a cyclone in 1962.

=== British colonial legacy ===
Wesleyan missionaries from Great Britain established schools in the area including Hartley College and the Methodist Girls High School.

There are American mission schools at Uduppiddy and Thunnalai.

== Heritage sites ==
Heritage sites in Point Pedro include the lighthouse, the Vallipuram temple and St. Lourdes church of Thumpalai.

=== Harbour ===
Point Pedro has a small harbour, which is controlled by the Sri Lankan army. If the much-delayed and frequently re-planned Sethusamudram Shipping Canal Project is completed, deepening the Palk Straits between India and Sri Lanka to allow larger ships to pass, rather than having to travel 650 km (350 nmi) around Sri Lanka, then Point Pedro and other ports in the Jaffna peninsula may see a significant increase in maritime trade, especially with India.

== Education ==
Schools in the town include Hartley College, Velautham Maha Vidyalayam, Vadamarachchi Hindu Girls' College and Methodist Girls High School.

== Notable people ==
- Captain Morris (M.O)– LTTE commander for the Point Pedro area.
- Captain Mayuran (Saba)–LTTE member and special bodyguard to leader Velupillai Prabhakaran.

== See also ==
- Jaffna Peninsula
- Extreme points of Sri Lanka
