= List of settlements in Northern Province (Sri Lanka) =

Northern Province is a province of Sri Lanka, containing the Jaffna District, Kilinochchi District, Mannar District, Mullaitivu District, and Vavuniya District. The following is a list of settlements in the province.

== A ==
Aayili, Adampan, Alampil, Alvai, Alaveddi, Achchankulam, Achchelu, Achchuveli, Adaichakal, Adukkalamoddai, Adampam, Adampan, Adampanai, Adampantalvu, Adappankulam, Adiyakulam, Aiyamperumal, Akattikkulam, Allaippiddi, Analativu, Annangkai, Amichchi Kulam, Aiyanaar Koayiladi, Aiyanaar puram, Aiyanaar-puram, Aiyan koayil Gramam, Aiyan Kulam, Aliyawalai, Ariyalai

== C ==
Chankanai, Changanacherry, Chaalampan, Chaavatkaddu, Chaalampaik Kulam, Chamalang Kulam, Chinnach Chaalampan, Chavakacheri, Cheddikulam, Chunnakam, Colombuthurai, Cheddi Kulam, Chiraampiyadi, Chiththira Meazhi

== D ==
Delft Island

== E ==
Eluvaitivu, Elephant Pass

== I ==
Inuvil, Ilavali, Iranamadu

== J ==
Jaffna

== K ==
Kaathaliyaar Chamalang kulam, Kaaraiththoor, Kanchanthoo, Kachchai, Kaithady, Kalladi, Kantharmadam, Kantharodai, Kankesanthurai, Kanakarayankulam, Kapputhoor Veli, Karainagar, Karaveddy, Karampanthoor, Karanthai Vaddavaan, Karaitivu, Karunkandalvannakulam, Kayts, Kerudavil, Kea Thoovu, Kilinochchi, Kokavil, Kokkuvil, Kokkilai, Kokkuthoduvai, Kondavil, Kopay, Kovalam, Kullapam Kulam, Kuppilankulam, Kuppilan Kurichy

== M ==
Maankulam, Madhu, Mallavi, Manalkadu, Mandativu, Manipay, Mankulam, Mannar, Meththanveli, Mirusuvil, Mullaitivu, Mulliyawalai, Myliddy, Manadkaadu, Madduvil, Manthuvil, Mandaan Minukkan

== N ==
Nallur, Nanaddan, Nedunkerny, Nagar Kovil, Nelliyady, Nilavarai, Ńaddankandal, Nelliady

== O ==
Oddusuddan, Omanthai, Olumadu,

== P ==
Paapamkulam, Pachilaipalli, Padaraveli, Pandatharippu, Pandarikulam Pandiyankulam, Palali, Palampiddi, Parangkich Chaalampan, Point Pedro (Paruththithurai), Paranthan, Periya Chaalampan, Pesalai, Periya Puliyangkulam, Periya Pollachi, Pollachi, Perumkulam, Paranthen Kerni, Pooneryn, Puliyankulam, Puloly, Puthukkudiyiruppu, Parayanalankulam, Pungudutivu, Puttur, Puthunagaram, Panamkamam, Punnalaikkadduvan, Passaiyoor

== S ==
Sandilipay, Sillalai, Suthumalai, Sugandipuram, Sangarathai

== T ==
Tachchankulam, Taddamalai, Taddankulam, Tadduvankoddi, Thaddankulam, Thaiyiddi, Thalaiady, Talaimannar, Thalladi, Thaalvupadu, Thamaraivillu, Thampa Gramam, Thampalai, Thampalakad, Thampanaikkulam, Thampanaikkulam East, Thampattai Muthalikkattu, Thanankilappu, Tanakkankulam, Thaandikkulam, Tanduvan, Thankodai, Tanmakkerni, Thannipavilan Kudiyiruppu, Thanneer Uttu, Thaantalkulam, Tharakundu, Tharanikkulam, Thavadi, Thavalai Iyattalai, Thavasikulam, Thavasiyakulam, Thavasiyur, Thayilan Kudiyiruppu, Thandikkulam, Tellippalai, Thunukkai, Thunnalai, Tharmapuram, Thekilpadantan, Thekkuluthu, Telliyankudiyiruppu, Thennamaravadi, Thenniyankulam, Thaentookki, Thaenudaiyan, Thanakkarukurichchi, Tharmakundu, Thatchchanthoppu, Thattantotam, Thavasiyur, Thevanpaddi, Thikkam, Thikkoddaimadu, Thimilarmadam, Terankandal, Therumurikandi, Thettakkuli, Thettavadimarutankulam, Tirunelveli East, Tirunelveli West, Tirunelveli, Thiruvadinilayam, Thiruvaiyaru Thottakadu, Tholakaddy, Thondaimanaru, Thoppu, Thullukudi Kudiyiruppu, Thumpalai, Thumpankerni, Thunnalai, Thunavy, Thuvarankerni

== U ==
Udaiyadi, Udayarsamalankulam, Udumbagal, Udaiyarthurai, Udupattukkandal, Udupiddy, Uduthurai, Uduvil, Uduveli, Ukkulankulam, Ulukkulam, Uluvaneri, Umaneri, Umayartuvarankulam, Unchalkaddi, Upparu, Uppukkulam, Upputtaravai, Umayaalpuram, Urani, Urelu, Uriyan, Urumpirai, Urvanikanpattu, Usan, Uthiravengai, Uthuvayankulam, Uttukkulam, Uvari, Uvarkkulam, Uvayatikulam, Uyarapulam, Uyilankulam, Uyilankulam, Mannar

== V ==
Vaddukoddai, Vadduvakallu, Vadakadu, Vaddakkachchi, Vaddakkandal, Vairandakaddukulam, Vaiyakkarai, Vakkappaddankandal-Metpuliyankulam, Valaiyakadu, Valayanmadam, Valalai, Vallai, Vallan, Valliyappalai, Vallipuram, Valantalai, Valappadu, Valveddi, Valvettiturai, Valigramam, Vanchiyankulam, Vanchiyankulam Mavilankeni, Vankalai, Vankalaikkulam, Vannakulam, Vannakulam, Mannar, Vannakulam West, Vannamarutankulam, Vannamoddai, Vannankeni, Vannankulam, Vannankulam, Jaffna, Vannanpuliyankulam, Vannansinnakkulam, Vannarpannai, Vannarpannai North West, Vannarpannai South East, Vannarpannai South West, Vannivilankulam, Vannichchiyatidal, Vanniyanmadu, Vairava Pulo Kulam, Vannikulam, Varani, Varanilvattalai, Variveli, Vairavarpuliyankulam, Varuthalaivilan, Vasavilan, Vatharaveddai, Vattirayan, Vathiri, Vattappalai, Vavunikulam, Vavuniya, Vavuniyanperiyakulam, Vayittiyankudiyiruppu, Vedamakilankulam, Veddaiyadaippu, Veddayamurippu, Veddukkadu, Vedivaittakallu, Veeman Gramam, Viramanikkatevanturai, Velakulam, Velanai, Velankulam, Velankulam, Vavuniya, Velarchinnakkulam, Velikkandal, Velikkulam, Vellai, Vellalakaddu, Vellampakkaddy, Vellamullivaikal, Vellankulam, Vempootukeni, Veppankulam, Veppankulam South, Veravil, Vettilaikkerni, Vettaimakkalkudiyiruppu, Vidattalkaddusinnakulam, Vidattalpalai, Vidattaltivu, Vidaththal-Pazhai, Vidaththal-Munai, Vidaththal-kaddu chinnak-kulam, Vilan, Vilathikulam, Villamparuku, Vimankallu, Vira Manikkatevan Turai, Viyaddikkulam, Viyaparimulai, Viyayadippannai

== See also ==
- List of cities in Sri Lanka
- List of towns in Sri Lanka
