= Northern Theatre of Eelam War IV =

Conflict between Sri lanka and LTTE separatists

- Part of the Eelam War IV
Date	July 2006 – May 18, 2009
Location	Sri Lanka
Result	Sri Lankan victory

Belligerents
Sri Lanka	Liberation Tigers of Tamil Eelam

Commanders and leaders
General Sarath Fonseka	Velupillai Prabhakaran †

Units involved
Sri Lanka Armed Forces; Sri Lanka Army; 53 Division; 55 Division; 56 Division; 57 Division; 58 Division; 59 Division; 61 Division; Task Force 8; Commando Regiment; Deep Penetration Unit; Artillery Regiment; Sri Lanka Navy; Sri Lanka Air Force; Sri Lanka Police; Special Task Force	Liberation Tigers of Tamil Eelam; Charles Anthony Brigade; Jeyanthan Brigade; Sea Tigers; Air Tigers; Black Tigers

Strength
250,000 (approx.)	Unknown

The Northern Theatre of Eelam War IV refers to the fighting that took place in the northern province of Sri Lanka between July 2006 and May 18, 2009.

== Beginning of the war ==
A new crisis leading to the first large-scale fighting since signing of the ceasefire occurred when the LTTE closed the sluice gates of the Mavil Aru (Mavil Oya) on July 21 and cut the water supply to 15,000 villages in government controlled areas. After the initial negotiations by the SLMM to open the gates failed, the Air Force attacked LTTE positions on July 26, and ground troops began an operation to open the gates. Following these moves, the political leader of the LTTE S Elilan announced an end to the cease-fire although Palitha Kohona, a government spokesman, stated that the government remained committed to the cease-fire.

The sluice gates were eventually reopened on August 8, with conflicting reports as to who actually opened them. Initially, the SLMM claimed that they managed to persuade the LTTE to lift the waterway blockade conditionally. However a government spokesman said that "utilities can not be used as bargaining tools" by the rebels and the government forces launched fresh attacks on LTTE positions around the reservoir. These attacks prompted condemnation from SLMM Chief of Staff, who stated "(The government does) have the information that the LTTE has made this offer,"... "It is quite obvious they are not interested in water. They are interested in something else." As the battle warmed up, the LTTE claimed that they opened the sluice gates "on humanitarian grounds" although this was disputed by military correspondents, who stated that the water began flowing immediately after the security forces carried out a precise bombing of the Mavil Oya anicut. Eventually, following heavy fighting with the rebels, government troops gained full control of the Mavil Oya reservoir on August 15.

== War in Jaffna ==
=== Battle of Jaffna ===
On August 11, 2006, fighting was renewed for control of the Jaffna peninsula, after six years of a World War One-like stalemate position. The mainland Jaffna Peninsula had been cut off by land from the rest of Sri Lanka after the Tigers (LTTE) overran the Elephant Pass base in early 2000. The only way the peninsula received supplies and fresh troops was by sea or air.

The LTTE Launched a pre-emptive attack on the Main SLN base (China Bay) in Trincomalee. The objective of the attack was to capture the naval base for at least couple of weeks and thereby cut off the supplies for the 40000 troops in the Jaffna peninsula. The major offensive against the Trincomalee Harbour was met with immediate resistance forcing tigers to retreat with heavy casualties after days of fighting. Even though the offensive failed the Tigers launched a massive ground attack on the forward defence lines in Muhmalai and Nargakovil.

Initially the Tigers broke through SLA positions and advanced north towards Jaffna, but after 10 hours of fierce fighting they were beaten back and returned to their original positions. The Sri Lankan government claimed that up to 700 rebels and 150 soldiers were killed in only 5 days of fighting by August 16, claiming that another 300 soldiers were wounded.

The LTTE continued to wage multiple smaller scale offensives with their troops from the Charles Antony Brigade and Jeyanthan Brigade actively attacking the SLA lines, but they were beaten back after suffering heavy casualties. By the end of the week the Tigers stationed themselves in their previous defence lines. Small skirmishes continued to occur between both sides during the next couple of months. During that time, the LTTE suffered another setback when the commander of the Victor Anti-Tank Unit, Lt.Col Akbar, was killed by random SLA shelling on October 7 while inspecting the forward defence lines at Muhamalai.

=== Battle of Muhamalai FDL ===
Meanwhile, in the north of the country, some of the bloodiest fighting since 2001 took place after the LTTE launched massive attacks on the Sri Lanka Army defence lines in the Jaffna peninsula on August 11. The LTTE used a force of 400 to 500 fighters in the attacks which consisted of land and amphibious assaults, and also fired a barrage of artillery at government positions, including the key military airbase at Palaly (Paluyāla). Initially, the Tigers broke through army defense lines around Muhamalai, and advanced further north, but they were halted after 10 hours of fierce fighting. Isolated battles continued over the next few days, but the LTTE was forced to give up its offensive due to heavy casualties. Up to 700 rebels and 150 soldiers were killed. Two months later, in October, an army offensive was launched from the city against rebel territory but it was crushed and resulted in the biggest loss of life for the military in four years with 129 soldiers killed and 519 wounded, while only 22 rebels were killed. The SLA accused the Tigers of killing 74 soldiers from a unit they said was surrounded and captured.

There was a fierce battle happened at Muhamale Forward Defence Lines (FDL) on April 23, 2008, and the fighting started around 02:30 hrs and continued until noon. There were heavy shelling reported from the LTTE side into SLA FDL, about 1000 rounds of mortars mostly of 81 mm, also 130mm / 152mm artillery rounds fired occasionally. The later on reports from the SLA said that they had gained the territory of 500 m land from LTTE control. The casualty figures not known from the LTTE side but was reported from SLA about 172 killed (KIA) and 33 (MIA). The LTTE handed over 28 dead bodies of SLA soldiers to ICRC.

=== Other battles in Jaffna peninsula ===
The LTTE attacked Sri Lankan Army-Navy joint military detachment stationed in Chiraththivu islet located between Mandathivu island and city of Jaffna on May 29, 2008 around 01:30 hrs. The detachment situated there for the purpose of monitoring LTTE's boat moments, and the purpose of attack is to develop psychological impact within the Sri Lankan military. According to the Jaffna Police, during the attack LTTE launched an artillery fire from Pooneryn area which killed at least 6 civilians and wounding around 20 by artillery shells fell into the villages of Pasiur, Kolombuthurai and Gurunagar. The military said they lost 1 soldier and 3 were missing in action.

== War in Wanni ==
The two major battle fronts in Vanni area are Welioya and Vavuniya.

=== Battle of Welioya ===
A suspected LTTE blast a road side bomb targeting civilian bus in north-eastern town of Welioya, which killed 13 people and injured 17 people on February 4, 2008 after few hours the country celebrated their 60 years of independence.

The aerial bombing by two LTTE light aircraft on Welioya SLA defence lines happened around 01:45 hrs April 27, 2008 just two days after the bomb blast in a civilian bus at Piliyandala, south of Colombo which killed 26 people and wounded 70. The Sri Lankan military said, three bombs were dropped by them but does not have any casualties or notable damages. The last LTTE's aerial bombing happened in October 2007 at Anuradhapura, during the LTTE's attack on Sri Lankan Air Force base.

The military of Sri Lanka captured a main LTTE supply base known as "Munnagam base" after three days of fighting on May 29, 2008. The base located 6 km north of Welioya FDL and 15 km south of Mullative city centre, also the base consisting of underground bunker system with domestic facilities.

The Sri Lankan army moved into the Kilinochchi district for the first time in 11 years.

== War in Mannar front ==
=== Battle of Silavathurai ===
Silavaturai, named after the small partridge (bird) known in Sinhala as "kirava", is a coastal location that served as a supply point for the LTTE in the Mannar (Mannaārama) area. The SL army had announced a major operation to oust separatists from the region, and on 2-September 2007 it announced the capture of the Sea Tiger base in Silvaturai and Arrippu areas. The military began the offensive aimed at seizing control of areas south of Mannar, saying rebels were holding some 6,000 civilians who want to escape LTTE conscription. The SL army Commander, Lt. Gen. Sarath Fonseka claimed it as a significant victory for the military as the LTTE used the base to smuggle in arms and ammunition from Tamil Nadu.

=== Battle of Madhu ===
Battle has taken place around the sacred Madhu Shrine which is the most revered Roman Catholic shrine in Sri Lanka. The Bishop of Mannar, Rayappu Joseph removed the sacred statue of Virgin Mary from the church for the first time in 400 years. The statue was taken into LTTE control area by The Bishop of Mannar.

The Mannar Bishop Rayappu Joseph appealed both sides to respect the area as a no-war zone. He further said that the LTTE had set up positions in front of the sacred shrine.

The Sri Lankan military gained the control of the Madhu shrine area from April 25, 2008 and also the media photographs showing some damages in the shrine.

The Sri Lankan Army completed repairs to the Madhu Shrine costing 1.5 million rupees allocated from the army budget and handed it over to the Bishop Rayappu Joseph. The bishop mentioned that arrangements have been made to bring the sacred statue back once the priests are settled there.

=== Battle of Adampan ===
The Sri Lankan military captured a small town of Adampan in Mannar during the morning of May 9, 2008 which makes a gateway for them to enter the north-eastern part of Mannar. The strategic town of Periyamadu and Palampiddy area which is inside the Madhu sanctuary are located in this region, also believed to be LTTE has well fortified bunker lines there. The Sri Lankan government military spokesman Brigadier Udaya Nanayakkara told media that SLA killed 15 LTTE cadres during the battle.

=== Liberation of Mannar District ===
On 2 August 2008 the Sri Lankan army captured the town of Vellankulam which was the last bastion of Tigers in the Mannar district. This marked the liberation of the entire Mannar district by the Army which took eight months.

== Chronology of towns captured by the Sri Lankan Armed Forces ==
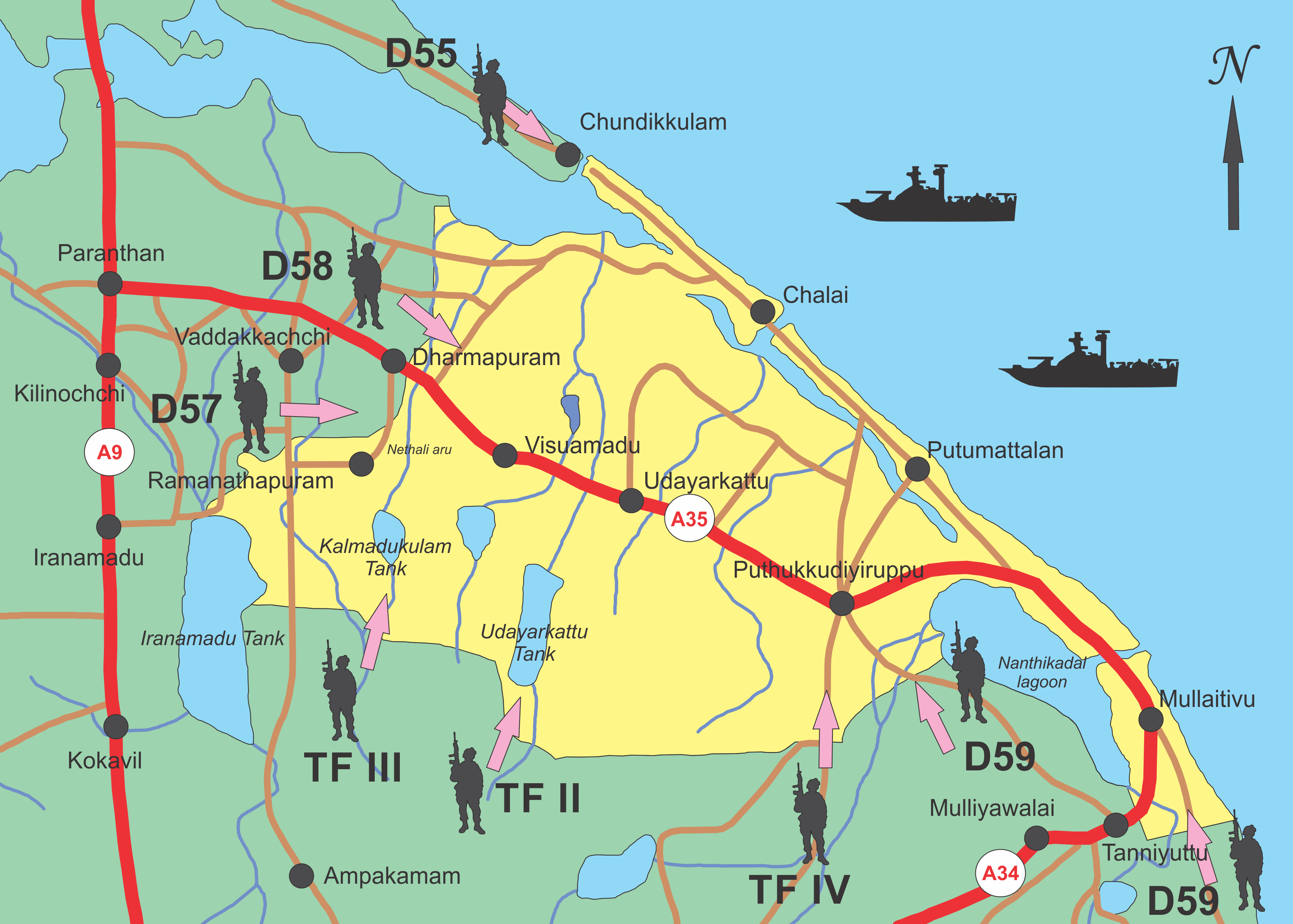
Situation in the Northern Theatre of Eelam War IV (17 January 2009)

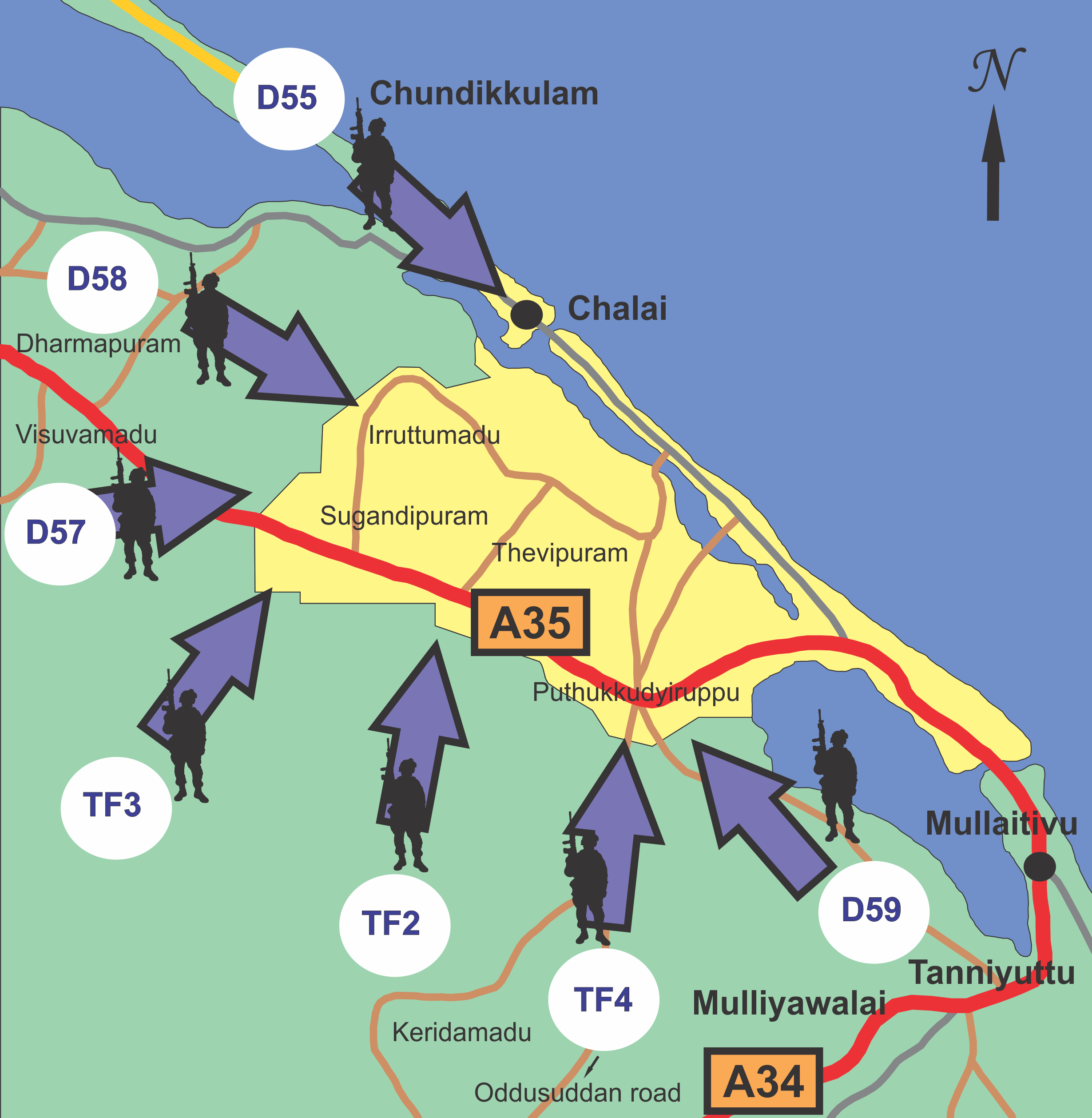
Situation in the Northern Theatre of Eelam War IV (31 January 2009)

- Adampan - 9 May 2008
- Uyilankulam - 29 June 2008
- Vidattaltivu - 16 July 2008
- Iluppaikkadavai - 20 July 2008
- Vellankulam - 2 August 2008
- Mulankavil - 12 August 2008
- Nachchikuda - 21 August 2008
- Silawaturai - 2 September 2008
- Kiranchi - 10 November 2008
- Palavi - 11 November 2008
- Valaippadu - 13 November 2008
- Devil's Point - 13 November 2008
- Pooneryn - 15 November 2008
- Mankulam - 17 November 2008
- Olumadu
- Kokkavil
- Alampil
- Nedunkerny
- Iranamadu - 31 December 2008
- Paranthan - 31 December 2008
- Kilinochchi - 02 January 2009

== See also ==
- Sri Lankan Civil War
- Eelam War IV
