= Vadakkandal massacre =

1985 mass murder in Sri Lanka

Vaddakkandal massacre
- Part of the Sri Lankan Civil War
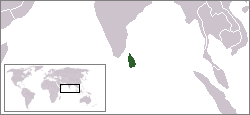
- Location of Sri Lanka
- Location: 8°54′17″N 80°02′04″E; Vaddakkandal, Mannar district, Northern Province, Sri Lanka
- Date: January 30, 1985 (+8 GMT)
- Target: Sri Lankan Tamil Civilians
- Deaths: 52
- Injuries: 40+
- Perpetrator: Sri Lankan military

Vaddakkandal massacre was a massacre of Tamil civilians in the Tamil village of Vaddakkandal in Mannar district of the Northern Province, Sri Lanka. At least 52 residents of the village who were mostly agricultural laborers working in their fields were brutally attacked and killed by the Sri Lankan military forces. More than 40 people were left seriously injured by the attack. Several of those killed included women, elderly, and even infants. There had been no investigations into the massacre and no member of the Sri Lankan Army has been brought to justice for the killings yet.

== Civilian massacre ==
Vaddakandal is a village situated near Adampan and Uyilankulam, situated in the Mannar district. On 30 January 1985, at the break of dawn, 200 military personnel stationed in the nearby Thalladi military camp moved into Vaddakandal along the Kadukkarai Lake.

Around 6.30 am they entered the homes of the villagers and began shooting and stabbing everyone. One of the Sri Lankan Air Force helicopters also strafed the village. The military proceeded to the village's Tamil Mixed School and attacked the principal, teachers and the students. At least Eighteen people were killed in the school itself.

Another group of personnel started attacking people working on the fields and those who were trying to escape were captured and shot dead. The attack continued for another six hours. At 2.00 pm, the military loaded the bodies onto its vehicles and transported them away to the Thalladi camp. Villagers attest that 52 people were killed and at least 40 more sustained grievous injuries.

== See also ==
- List of attacks on civilians attributed to Sri Lankan government forces
