= Vavunikulam =

Vavunikulam is a village in the Mullaitivu District, Sri Lanka, and is located about 12 kilometres (7.5 mi) west of Mankulam. Its actual name is Bavanikulam. It contains a dam that provides water to paddy fields in the region. It is also located less than 10 kilometres (6.2 mi) from the small towns of Mallavi and Thunukkai. In Tamil Bavani refer to Goddess and the second part of the name, kulam, translates to Lake.

The village has been the location of recent fighting in the Sri Lankan Civil War, according to the Sri Lankan government.
