= Veraval (disambiguation) =

Veraval is a city in Gujarat, India.

Veraval may also refer to:

- Veraval Junction railway station, a railway station in Veraval

== See also ==
- Veravil, a small town in northern Sri Lanka
- Viraval, Navsari, a village in Navsari district of Gujarat, India
