= Nagarkovil Maha Vidyalayam =

Nagarkovil M.V
- Nagar Kovil, Jaffna District, Northern Province; Sri Lanka

Information
- School type: Public provincial II
- School district: Vadamarachchi Education Zone
- Authority: Northern Provincial Council
- School number: 1006008
- Grades: 1-11
- Gender: Mixed

Nagarkovil Maha Vidyalayam is a school located in Nagar Kovil, Jaffna District, Sri Lanka. Sri Lankan Air Force bombed the school on September 22, 1995, killing 71 students and wounding over 150 people.

== See also ==
- List of schools in Northern Province, Sri Lanka
