= Grease devil crisis in Sri Lanka =

Civil unrest in Sri Lanka

The grease devil crisis was a moral panic caused by a wave of violent incidents affecting mainly the Tamil and Muslim ethnic minorities in post-war Sri Lanka between August and September 2011. Widespread incidents of male intruders covered in black grease, dubbed "grease devils", assaulting women in their homes at night were reported across the country. The culprits were widely suspected to have been linked to the Sri Lankan security forces. The incidents sparked vigilante violence; and clashes between the minority communities and the security forces for the first time since the end of the Sri Lankan civil war in 2009. The crisis was seen by analysts as a manifestation of the widespread feelings of insecurity and distrust of the authorities among these communities.

== Background ==
Sri Lanka had emerged from a 26-year civil war sparked by ethnic tensions between the majority Sinhalese and minority Tamils which came to an end in May 2009 with the victory of the Sinhalese-dominated government forces amid allegations of widespread human rights abuses. Post-war Sri Lanka saw heavy military presence in the Tamil-majority north and east which left the war-ravaged communities, especially women, in a vulnerable situation with reports of sexual violence by the security forces. There was a culture of impunity for wartime atrocities, as the government rejected independent investigation. Increasing militarisation of the north was a major issue, which was described as "extraordinarily high" with an estimated ratio of one security personnel for every five civilians. The larger issues that led to the war remained unresolved and the Tamil population remained alienated from the state. By the start of 2011, there had been a spate of killings, abductions and burglaries in the north, causing panic among locals who suspected state-affiliated forces.

== Grease devil incidents ==
=== Central provinces ===
In July 2011, two Sri Lankan Army soldiers and two deserters were arrested in connection to a series of sexual assaults and murders of seven mostly elderly women in the largely Sinhalese town of Kahawatta in southern Sri Lanka. These incidents sparked rumours of a "ghost" among the locals and sensationalist media coverage of the crimes fuelled fears nationally. The old figure of the "greased robber", who smeared his body in grease to evade capture, transformed into a more sinister form as an attacker of women. Amid the growing fears, seven youths from the Kandy area, accused of being grease devils, were arrested on 2 August for peeping into homes at night. The police held a press conference on 5 August to allay public panic, announcing the grease devil to be a myth, while also contradictorily stating that they had all been arrested.

Between 8 August and 10 September, the panic escalated into a crisis in rural areas predominantly inhabited by Tamil-speaking ethnic minorities, as the Tamil news media reported hundreds of daily grease devil sightings and attacks. It began with reports of a series of attacks on Indian Tamil women in the Central Province that left them with scratches on their bodies. One 30-year-old Devika Joseph was hospitalised following such attack by an intruder at her Badulla home. The widespread reports sparked a demonstration by women in Badulla town. The first incident of vigilante violence erupted on a tea estate in Haputale on 11 August when a group of Indian Tamil workers killed two salesmen who were mistaken for grease devils. As the panic spread, the tea estates in the province became paralysed for days as workers stayed home in fear.

=== Eastern Province ===
==== Muslims ====
The frequency of reported grease devil incidents soon shifted to the war-torn eastern and northern provinces where the crisis became most severe. On 10 August, two Muslim women were attacked outside their houses on the east coast. In Valaichchenai, a 31-year-old Ushanar Marzuka was confronted by two men with their faces painted black and was scratched by one of them with a sharp object. Some hundred locals who gathered after hearing her cries caught one of the suspects who was beaten before being handed over to the police. Soon after the arrest, the police released the suspect, which provoked anger among the locals and the ensuing clashes between them and the police led to two civilians and two policemen being hospitalised with injuries. Later that day, further south in Pottuvil, a 22-year-old Aashika was attacked by a man dressed in black who then fled.

On 11 August, in mainly Muslim areas in the southeastern district of Ampara, there was a surge in grease devil incidents and suspects who were caught by the locals and handed over to the police were soon released which angered the locals. That many of the suspects had run into police stations and military camps also reinforced the popular suspicion of the grease devils being soldiers in disguise; and the police was seen as complicit in their dismissing public fears as imaginary. The collapse of public confidence in law enforcement led to vigilante groups patrolling their areas and attacking suspected grease devils.

Several incidents that night created panic among locals in and around Pottuvil, leading to clashes with the army, arrests and culminating in violent protests the next day, followed by a curfew being imposed. Wildlife officers carrying out an elephant census that night were attacked by villagers in Pottuvil and Sammanthurai further north. Villagers pursued the officers to a police station in Sammanthurai where a violent confrontation with the police ensued. In Urani of Pottuvil, authorities failed to convince agitated villagers the officers they had caught were not grease devils. Clashes with soldiers ensued when the army intervened. Six individuals were severely assaulted by the army and taken to the Pottuvil police station before being hospitalised. On the next day, protesters clashed with the Pottuvil police demanding the release of those who had been arrested and the removal of the army from the area, which prompted intervention by the army who assaulted protesters and shot dead a local Muslim politician.

On the same day in Thirukkovil further north, villagers clashed with the police demanding the grease devil suspects in custody to be handed over to them, prompting the police to open fire, wounding two protesters and killing one.

On 15 August, a 20-year-old woman was attacked at her home in Akkaraipattu by two men dressed in black who groped and scratched the victim after binding her. Further north in the Muslim town of Kinniya in Trincomalee District, there had been violent confrontations between the locals and the security forces since the previous day over a suspected grease devil being sheltered at the navy base. On the 14th, two of the large crowd of demonstrators outside the base were shot and injured by the navy and 24 others were arrested by the Special Task Force (STF). The next day a government office in the town was sieged by about 4,000 demonstrators demanding their release, which was later defused with the intervention of top Muslim ministers from Colombo. Consequently, military presence was increased in the town, subjecting residents to checks.

As the grease devil sightings intensified, fear and tension prevailed, suspicion of outsiders grew, women stayed indoors and mosque attendance for evening prayers dwindled. Many Muslims in the east believed the attacks were meant as a religious provocation since they took place in the holy month of Ramadan. Rumours and conspiracy theories also circulated which attributed superhuman powers to the grease devils.

==== Tamils ====
Thereafter, increasing numbers of grease devil incidents were being reported in Tamil areas of these provinces, starting with Batticaloa District in the east. On 16 August, residents of Puthoor staged a demonstration calling for the removal of the Sethukuda police station after a suspicious man they had pursued run into it. Another demonstration against the police erupted the next day in nearby Urani after an intruder had escaped into a police post following an assault on a young woman at her house. The police attacked the protesters, hospitalising an elderly person. The villagers accused the security forces of attempting to commit sexual assaults against Tamil women while using the grease devil issue as an excuse. On 18 August in Thandiyadi, a confrontation between villagers and the STF ensued after villagers learned four strangers had been brought to a jungle nearby. Many of the villagers were severely beaten by the STF and 18 of those arrested by the police were later hospitalised. The villagers expressed distrust of the police and opposed their presence in their villages.

=== Northern Province ===
==== Vavuniya District ====
In the northern district of Vavuniya, fears about grease devils sparked violent confrontation between Tamil villagers and the police. On the night of 20 August, two strange men suspected to be grease devils were seen in Komarasankulam with a motorbike registered in a southern province. When the villagers later found the men hiding in a bush and questioned them, the men claimed to be police officers but refused to produce identification. Agitated villagers attacked the men with sticks and blocked police officers from taking the men to their custody even as a police sergeant identified the men as police. Eventually the situation was defused with the arrival of army officers who took the men to their custody. However, about 60 armed policemen in riot gear arrived at the scene, prompting many villagers to flee. The remaining 75 men and boys were detained by the police. They were beaten with sticks and poles, including a Christian priest who tried to intervene, breaking one boy's leg. Many escaped but eleven were arrested and severely beaten in police jeep before being taken to the police station, where two of them were subjected to further torture before being hospitalised.

Widespread reports of sexual assaults and robberies committed by armed Sinhalese intruders suspected to be linked to the security forces stoked grease devil scare among Tamil and Muslim residents in remote villages in the district, forcing many to seek shelter in more populated areas during that weekend. Some intruders captured by villagers revealed they were home guards operated by the Defence Ministry and were rescued by the police.

==== Mannar District ====
There were also daily attacks on women in the Tamil-dominated northwestern coastal area of Pesalai in the Mannar District since 14 August. On 21 August, villagers there chased a suspected grease devil into a navy checkpoint after he had jumped over the fence of a house. Villagers numbering about 1000 gathered near the checkpoint and demanded the suspect be produced. They were attacked by military personnel and between 10 and 15 people were hospitalised with severe injuries.

In Thottaveli further southeast, fears about grease devils among villagers had led to vigilance committees being established on 19 August with police permission to guard the village each night. On the evening of 22 August, villagers chased a suspected grease devil who managed to escape after he had entered a woman's house. Later that night, villagers blocked an army truck from entering the village but the army officers insisted they had control over the entire area and rejected the vigilance committee. As an argument ensued, two officers began beating the villagers with guns and batons, injuring three. The rest ran toward the nearby church and rang its bell to sound the alarm, prompting about 500 villagers to gather near it, who were also beaten by the army officers. Later, twenty more army officers arrived and began beating the villagers, including women and children.

Overall, about 800 villagers were beaten. Several were injured as they were beaten with poles wrapped in barbed wire. Hundreds of officers in 15 to 23 army trucks were estimated to have entered the village. Villagers stated they saw a masked man dressed in black in one of those vehicles whom they suspected to be the grease devil who had earlier entered their village. On the next day, the area navy commander addressed the villagers who had sought shelter at the church, threatening to shoot them if they come near military camps and accused the Catholic priests of instigating the villagers. On 24 August, the commander repeated the same threats at a meeting held at a Pesalai church which was attended by villagers and parish priests from both Pesalai and Thottaveli. Military presence was increased following the violence.

==== Jaffna District ====
By 21 August, media attention had shifted to the Tamil heartland of Jaffna peninsula in the north. The same patterns would be repeated here. A pervasive sense of fear gripped Jaffna and residents felt insecure despite the heavy military presence. As women dreaded the nights, men guarded the roads. Weapons, including kitchen knives, were confiscated by the police. Most residents believed the grease devils also sexually assaulted women.

On the night of 22 August in Navanthurai on the outskirts of Jaffna town, villagers spotted five men they suspected to be grease devils. Three of them, covered in black grease, were seen on the roof of the local church. Villagers stated the men tried to attack women with knives after entering houses. Alarmed by women's screams the villagers chased after these men who ran into a nearby army camp. The villagers then gathered outside the camp and demanded the suspects be produced, which the army refused. The suspects were later seen in military uniforms as they were being driven out of the camp in an army jeep. The agitated villagers threw stones at the jeep but were dispersed when the army opened fire.

Later that night, the army consisting between 6 and 12 officers raided each house in the village as the residents slept and dragged out the men, who were brutally beaten with iron rods before being taken to the army camp. Houses were ransacked, valuables looted and women and children were also beaten during the raid. Over 100 of these detained young Tamil men were later arrested by the police. A police spokesman claimed that Tamils and Muslims had got together to attack the army camp unprovoked, dismissing the grease devil accusation as false. The men suffered broken bones and showed signs of torture but were denied treatment for their injuries for over 8 hours. Some were also forced to sign statements in the Sinhala language which they did not understand. The court proceedings became a political spectacle with the attendance of various community leaders. With most men arrested or in hiding and with increased military presence, many women left the village out of fear.

=== Puttalam District ===
There was also major escalation in the Muslim areas of the Puttalam District in the northwest. On 19 August, a 27-year-old Muslim woman was grabbed and scraped by a man dressed in black outside her house in the village of Vannimukkulam in Kalpitiya. She was taken to a private hospital after state hospital refused to treat her, accusing her of fabricating the attack. Hours later at night in Kudirippuwa on the west coast of Kalpitiya, a policeman in plainclothes was beaten up by the villagers after being mistaken for a grease devil. Police rescued the injured officer and took him to hospital while the crowd rampaged. On the same day in the village of Karaithivu, a 62-year-old Muslim man was hospitalised with serious injuries after the three suspicious men he chased beat him with metal objects. He believed the men were grease devils and claimed they wore slippery black clothing, had blades attached to their hands and one of them had cut his face with steel claws.

On the next day, in Kalpitiya town, a clash ensued between the locals and the navy at a state hospital when the navy brought a suspected grease devil there for treatment after being beaten by the villagers. That night in Kalpitiya a policeman in plainclothes was also beaten by the locals who suspected him of being a grease devil. Later the police arrested 13 individuals and beat them severely.

On 21 August in Puttalam town, a Sinhalese policeman named Navaratne Bandara was beaten to death by a Muslim mob during a protest against a grease devil incident. One account suggested the policeman was accused of harbouring a man whom the mob suspected of being a grease devil. Few hours earlier that day further north in Manalthivu, Muslim villagers spotted unknown intruders entering a residence and chased them. Policemen who intervened opened fire at the crowd, reportedly after being attacked, injuring five including a child. This led to a violent protest in which, by another account, officer Bandara was killed. About 25 suspects were arrested by the police in connection to the killing. The incident led to ethnic tensions in the area, with Muslims fearing Sinhalese backlash and Sinhalese protesters chanting anti-Muslim slogans. Military was deployed with tanks in the town. On 23 August in a meeting with Muslim religious leaders, Defence Secretary Gotabaya Rajapaksa issued a warning against Muslims confronting the military.

Tamils in the district were also affected. On 22 August, a crowd had gathered at the Norochcholai Church following an arrest of a villager in connection to an assault on a policeman who was suspected of being a grease devil. About 15 military personnel arrived at the scene and attacked the crowd with batons. One Tamil man in the crowd, a heart patient named Perumal Sivakumar, was hospitalised with injuries and later died from heart failure. On 25 August in the Tamil coastal village of Udappu, a 70-year-old mother of a Hindu priest was hospitalised after being attacked at her house at 3 am by a suspected grease devil who scratched her face and fled.

=== Impact ===
The incidents had ceased abruptly by the second week of September. Overall, according to one estimate, there were about 40 grease devil incidents reported across nine districts, with the crisis resulting in the deaths of at least five individuals by 23 August. Some victims also reported sexual violence such as being raped and their breasts being bitten. Hundreds were arrested and injured following clashes with the security forces. Police arrested 47 individuals who they claimed were posing as grease devils to commit crimes or spreading rumours about grease devils. One estimate suggested that about 30 to 40 percent of the reported incidents were real with the rest being fabrications. Most of the culprits caught were Sinhalese, with some being members of the security forces. The crisis left a lasting impact on minority women, adversely affecting their sense of safety and mobility. It was seen by Tamils and Muslims as the worst unrest since the end of the war and an year later both groups in the east recalled the panic they felt during the crisis as being worse than what they had endured during the war.

== Explanations ==
The crisis led to competing explanations about the causes and culprits. Both Tamils and Muslims overwhelmingly believed that the grease devil culprits were members of the security forces whose targets were the minorities. This belief was reinforced by the facts that many of the suspects were seen running into military camps and police stations, and most of the incidents were reported in minority areas.

The minority communities were, however, ambiguous about the intention. Tamils saw the phenomenon as a continuation of arbitrary state violence that they had long been subjected to throughout the war. Tamil commentators also believed it was a pretext for prolonging the emergency rule which empowered the military and was under international pressure to be lifted. Muslims in the east saw it as a deliberate ploy by the government to provoke anger and flush out hidden weapons. Months earlier the eastern military commander demanded that illegal arms be surrendered after several isolated shooting incidents in the area. One analyst suggested that after Tamils in the north had been subdued with the end of the war, the government needed another conflict to justify strong military presence, therefore it targeted the more robust Muslim community in the east with grease devil attacks. There were also rumours circulating among all communities about the grease devil being an army operation to collect female blood so that black magic rituals can be performed to protect President Mahinda Rajapaksa.

On the other hand, the government, police and military denied any responsibility for the grease devil attacks. They also denied the existence of the grease devils and dismissed the phenomenon as a mass hysteria fuelled by rumours. The authorities and pro-government newspapers variously claimed the crisis was instigated by rumour-mongering criminals to remove the military so they can commit other crimes; accused "promiscuous" women of fabricating stories; blamed the opposition party JVP; and claimed it was a conspiracy by the Tamil diaspora, Tamil politicians and LTTE revivalists to cause chaos and destabilise the government.
