= Battle of Mankulam =

Military conflict in Sri Lanka

The Battle of Mankulam was fought from 12 June to 14 November 1990 in Mankulam, Sri Lanka. The Sri Lanka Army camp at Mankulam was besieged by the Liberation Tigers of Tamil Eelam for several days before they captured it.
