= Nagarkovil school bombing =

1995 Sri Lankan Air Force airstrike of a civilian school in Jaffna, Sri Lanka

- Part of the Sri Lankan Civil War
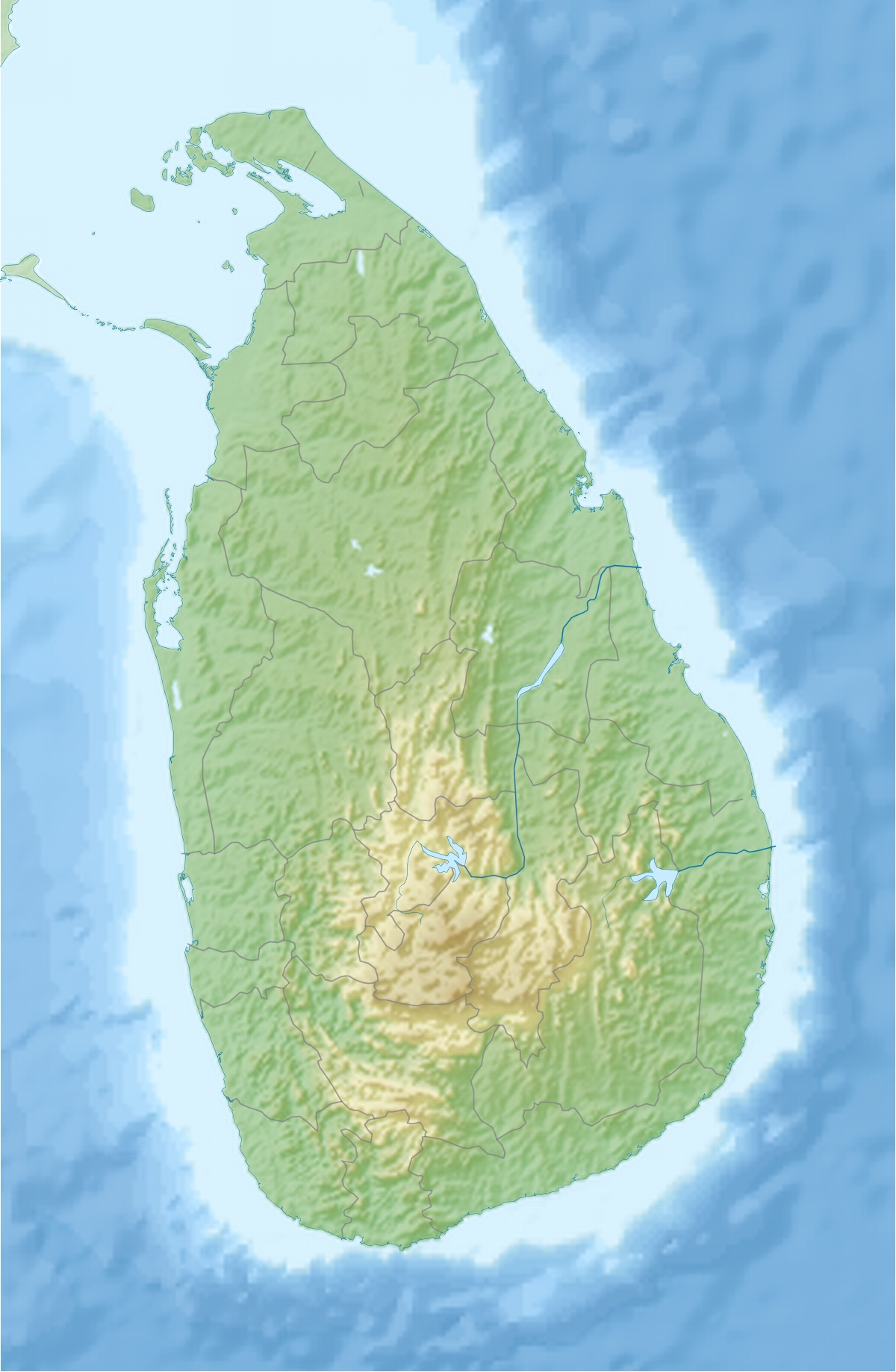
- Location: 9°42′02″N 80°18′31″E; Nagar Kovil, Sri Lanka
- Date: September 22, 1995 (+6 GMT)
- Target: Sri Lankan Tamils
- Attack type: Aerial bombardment
- Weapon: Bomb
- Deaths: 71
- Injuries: 150
- Perpetrator: Sri Lankan Airforce

The Nagarkovil school bombing was an airstrike on 22 September 1995 in which the Sri Lankan Air Force bombed the Nagarkovil Maha Vidyalayam school in Jaffna in northern Sri Lanka, resulting in the death of, by varying accounts, 34-71 Sri Lankan Tamil civilians, primarily schoolchildren, and injuries to many more. Sri Lankan Defense spokesman admitted the incident but claimed that it was a LTTE facility and several of the dead were LTTE cadres. The airstrike took place 12 hours after the Sri Lankan government had imposed a press censorship on war-related events.

== Accounts and reactions ==
=== University Teachers for Human Rights (Jaffna) ===
According to University Teachers for Human Rights (UTHR), a Jaffna-based organization, the staff of Nagarkovil Government School noticed bomber activity by the Sri Lanka Air Force around the school the morning of Friday, September 22, 1995. Several children who had come out of school had sheltered under a tree, waiting for the bombers to leave. About 12:45 pm a bomb fell near the tree, instantly killing 39 and injuring others. Some people injured by the bombing later died from their wounds.

=== Human Rights Watch ===
The 1996 HRW annual country report described "a major offensive on the Jaffna peninsula" by the Sri Lankan government which began on September 22, and which included curbs on war-related reporting by both the domestic and international press. "Among the first stories to be subjected to these censorship requirements were reports that on September 21 and 22, heavy shelling and aerial attacks by government forces on the northern Jaffna region had killed some seventy civilians, including many school children." Human Rights Watch also cited a Reuters report from September 23 that the army had denied the incident and that the story had been "subjected to military censors, who deleted quotes from civilians on the reported deaths of twenty children."

=== Australian Foreign Ministry ===
In a letter of October 6, 1995, the Australian government expressed a concern about "tragic incidents where non combatant Tamil civilians have been killed in military exchanges," mentioning "the reported deaths of 44 school children when a school was bombed at the village of Nagarkovil on September 22."

== See also ==
- List of attacks on civilians attributed to Sri Lankan government forces
