= Thampanaikkulam =

- Town
- Location within Northern Province Location within Sri Lanka Location within Asia
- Coordinates: 8°47′56″N 80°6′27″E
- Country: Sri Lanka
- Province: Northern Province
- District: Mannar District
- Time zone: UTC+5:30 (Sri Lanka Standard Time)

Thampanaikkulam (Tamil: தம்பனைக்குளம், Sinhala: තම්පනායික්කුලම්), is a small town in Sri Lanka. It is located within the Mannar District, Northern Province.

It is situated on the Medawachchiya-Talaimannar (A14) Road, approximately 27 km (17 mi) south-east of Mannar.

The town was used as a relocation camp for Tamil refugees displaced during Sri Lankan Civil War.

== See also ==
- List of towns in Northern Province, Sri Lanka
