= Vettilaikkerni =

Town in Sri Lanka

- Country: Sri Lanka
- Province: Northern Province
- Time zone: UTC+5:30 (Sri Lanka Standard Time)

Vettilaikkerni is a small town in Sri Lanka. It is located within Northern Province. It houses a Sri Lankan Army (SLA) base along the beach that guards the coastline.

== See also ==
- List of towns in Northern Province, Sri Lanka
