= Nanaddan =

Coordinates: 8°50′N 79°58′E

- Interactive map of Nanaddan
- Country: Sri Lanka
- Province: Northern Province
- Time zone: UTC+5:30 (Sri Lanka Standard Time)

Nanaddan is a small town in Sri Lanka. It is located within Northern Province.

== See also ==
- List of towns in Northern Province, Sri Lanka
