= Vannankulam, Jaffna =

- Interactive map of Vannankulam, Jaffna
- Coordinates: 9°39′08″N 80°02′07″E
- Country: Sri Lanka
- Province: Northern Province
- Time zone: UTC+5:30 (Sri Lanka Standard Time)

Vannankulam, Jaffna is a small town in Sri Lanka. It is located within Northern Province.

== See also ==
- List of towns in Northern Province, Sri Lanka
