= Uluvaneri =

Coordinates: 9°03′N 80°16′E

- Interactive map of Uluvaneri
- Country: Sri Lanka
- Province: Northern Province
- Time zone: UTC+5:30 (Sri Lanka Standard Time)

Uluvaneri is a small town in Sri Lanka. It is located within Northern Province.

== See also ==
- List of towns in Northern Province, Sri Lankanaddankandal is a small town near uluvaneri
