= Thiruvaiyaru, Sri Lanka =

Thiruvaiyaru
- Country: Sri Lanka
- Province: Northern Province
- Time zone: UTC+5:30:00 (Sri Lanka Standard Time)

Thiruvaiyaru is a small town in Sri Lanka. It is located within Northern Province.

== See also ==
- List of towns in Northern Province, Sri Lanka
