= Karunkandalvannakulam =

Coordinates: 8°56′N 80°02′E

Karunkandal maha vithiyalayam vaddakkandal
- Interactive map of Karunkandal maha vithiyalayam vaddakkandal
- Country: Sri Lanka
- Province: Northern Province
- Time zone: UTC+5:30 (Sri Lanka Standard Time)

Karunkandal maha vithiyalayam vaddakkandal is a small village in Sri Lanka. It is located within Northern Province.

== See also ==
- List of towns in Northern Province, Sri Lanka
