= Vira Manikkatevan Turai =

- Country: Sri Lanka
- Province: Northern Province
- Time zone: UTC+5:30 (Sri Lanka Standard Time)

Vira Manikkatevan Turai is a small town in Sri Lanka. It is in the Northern Province.

== See also ==
- List of towns in Northern Province, Sri Lanka
