= Udupattukkandal =

Coordinates: 9°27′N 80°28′E

- Interactive map of Udupattukkandal
- Country: Sri Lanka
- Province: Northern Province
- Time zone: UTC+5:30 (Sri Lanka Standard Time)

Udupattukkandal is a small town in Sri Lanka. It is located within Kilinochchi District, Northern Province.

== See also ==
- List of towns in Northern Province, Sri Lanka
