= Vavuni Kulam =

- வவுனி குளம் (Tamil)
- Location within Northern Province Vavuni Kulam (Sri Lanka)
- Location: Northern Province
- Coordinates: 09°05′19″N 80°20′54″E
- Type: Artificial lake
- River sources: Pali Aru
- Catchment area: 88 sq mi (228 km^{2})
- Managing agency: Department of Irrigation, Northern Provincial Council
- Water volume: 35,300 acre⋅ft (43,541,909 m^{3})

Vavuni Kulam (Tamil: வவுனி குளம் Vavuṉi Kuḷam) is an irrigation tank in northern Sri Lanka, approximately 2 mi (3 km) south east of Mallavi.

== History ==
The tank on Pali Aru was earlier knowns as Peli Vapi. Restoration of the tank, which had a catchment area of 88 sq mi (228 km^{2}), commenced in 1954 with the support of the Australian government.

By the late 1960s the tank's bund was 2 mi (3 km) long and 24 ft (7 m) high whilst the tank's storage capacity was 35,300 acre⋅ft (43,541,909 m^{3}) and its water spread area was 3,150 acres (1,275 ha). There was a 500 ft (152 m) spill on the left bank and two spills on the right bank - 1,200 ft (366 m) and 700 ft (213 m). The left and right bank sluices were each 4 ft by 3 ft 6 in whilst the central sluice had a diameter of 18 in. By 2014 the tank was capable of irrigating 6,900 acres (2,792 ha).
