= Thampattai Muthalikkattu =

- Country: Sri Lanka
- Province: Northern Province
- Time zone: UTC+5:30 (Sri Lanka Standard Time)

Thampattai Muthalikkattu is a small town in Sri Lanka, within Northern Province.

== See also ==
- List of towns in Northern Province, Sri Lanka
