= Vannarpannai North West =

Coordinates: 9°41′N 80°01′E

- Interactive map of Vannarpannai North West
- Country: Sri Lanka
- Province: Northern Province
- Time zone: UTC+5:30 (Sri Lanka Standard Time)

Vannarpannai North West is a small town in Sri Lanka. It is located within Northern Province.

== See also ==
- List of towns in Northern Province, Sri Lanka
