= Villamparuku =

Coordinates: 9°04′N 79°50′E

Periya Karisal
- Interactive map of Periya Karisal
- Country: Sri Lanka
- Province: Northern Province
- Time zone: UTC+5:30 (Sri Lanka Standard Time)

Periya Karisal is a small town in Sri Lanka. It is located within Northern Province.

== See also ==
- List of towns in Northern Province, Sri Lanka
