= Vannankulam =

Vannankulam vanarakulam
- Country: Sri Lanka
- Province: Northern Province
- Time zone: UTC+5:30 (tamilnadu)

Vannankulam is a small town in Sri Lanka. It is located within Northern Province.

== See also ==
- List of towns in Northern Province, Sri Lanka
