= Thannipavilan Kudiyiruppu =

Coordinates: 9°03′N 79°51′E

- Interactive map of Thannipavilan Kudiyiruppu
- Country: Sri Lanka
- Province: Northern Province
- Time zone: UTC+5:30 (Sri Lanka Standard Time)

Thannipavilan Kudiyiruppu is a small town in the Northern Province of Sri Lanka.

== See also ==
- List of towns in Northern Province, Sri Lanka
