= Vathiri =

Coordinates: 9°48′N 80°12′E

Vathiri, Sri Lanka வதிரி
- Interactive map of Vathiri, Sri Lanka
- Country: Sri Lanka
- Province: Northern Province
- District: Jaffna
- Time zone: UTC+5:30 (Sri Lanka Standard Time)

Vathiri (Tamil: வதிரி) is a small town in Jaffna district in the Northern Province of Sri Lanka.

== See also ==
- List of towns in Northern Province, Sri Lanka

www.vathiri.com
