= Thattantotam =

Coordinates: 9°33′N 80°26′E

- Interactive map of Thattantotam
- Country: Sri Lanka
- Province: Northern Province
- Time zone: UTC+5:30 (Sri Lanka Standard Time)

Thattantotam is a small town in Northern Province, Sri Lanka.

== See also ==
- List of towns in Northern Province, Sri Lanka
