= Adaichakal =

Coordinates: 7°36′N 81°36′E

- Interactive map of Adaichakal
- Country: Sri Lanka
- Province: Northern Province
- Elevation: 358 ft (109 m)
- Time zone: UTC+5:30 (Sri Lanka Standard Time)

Adaichakal is a small town in Sri Lanka. It is located within Northern Province.

== See also ==
- List of towns in Northern Province, Sri Lanka
