= Udaiyarthurai =

Town in Sri Lanka

Coordinates: 9.6°N 80.5°E

- Interactive map of Udaiyarthurai
- Country: Sri Lanka
- Province: Northern Province
- Time zone: UTC+5:30 (Sri Lanka Standard Time)

Udaiyarthurai is a small town in Sri Lanka. It is located within Northern Province.

== See also ==
- List of towns in Northern Province, Sri Lanka
