= Thampakamam =

- Country: Sri Lanka
- Province: Northern Province
- Time zone: UTC+5:30 (Sri Lanka Standard Time)

Thampakamam is a small town located within the Northern Province of Sri Lanka.

== See also ==
- List of towns in Northern Province, Sri Lanka
