= Myliddy =

Sri Lankan town

M yliddy மயிலிட்டி මඉලිඩ්ඩි
- Location within Northern Province
- Coordinates: 9°48′N 80°03′E
- Country: Sri Lanka
- Province: Northern
- District: Jaffna
- Time zone: UTC+5:30 (Sri Lanka Standard Time)

Myliddy (Tamil: மயிலிட்டி; Sinhala: මඉලිඩ්ඩි) is a small town in Sri Lanka. It is located within Northern Province. It is described as a "typical Jaffna fishing village." It is located at the mid-part of the Jaffna Peninsula's Northern coast. The town has been under the high security zone since 1990 due to its close proximity to the Jaffna Airport and the Palali military Base. The town was released to the original inhabitants on 3 May 2017, after 27 years. Only less than half has been released up to date (end of 2019). The fishing town or village was famous for its shark fish or சுறா (sura) in Tamil before the Sri Lankan Civil War.

== See also ==
- List of towns in Northern Province, Sri Lanka
