= Vidattalpalai =

Coordinates: 9°38′N 80°15′E

- Interactive map of Vidattalpalai
- Country: Sri Lanka
- Province: Northern Province
- Time zone: UTC+5:30 (Sri Lanka Standard Time)

Vidattalpalai is a small town in Sri Lanka. It is located within Jaffna District, Northern Province.

== See also ==
- List of towns in Northern Province, Sri Lanka
