= Tharakundu =

Coordinates: 9°00′N 79°52′E

Tharapuram Tharapuram
- Interactive map of Tharapuram
- Country: Sri Lanka
- Province: Northern Province
- Time zone: UTC+5:30 (Sri Lanka Standard Time)

Tharapuram is a small village in Gulf of Mannar Sri Lanka. It is located within Northern Province. Sri Lankan cabinet Minister Rishad Bathiudeen hails from this Village. Also Former Member of Parliament Iyoob born in this Village.

== See also ==
- List of towns in Northern Province, Sri Lanka
