= Thennamaravadi =

- Country: Sri Lanka
- Province: Northern Province
- Time zone: UTC+5:30 (Sri Lanka Standard Time)

Thennamaravadi is a fishing village located in Kuchchaveli Pradhesiya Sabha of the Trincomalee district. It is 73 km from Trincomalee town.

== See also ==
- List of towns in Northern Province, Sri Lanka
