= Thunnalai =

Thunnalai துன்னாலை තුන්නල
- Village
- Location within Northern Province
- Coordinates: 9°47′0″N 80°14′0″E
- Country: Sri Lanka
- Province: Northern
- District: Jaffna
- DS Division: Vadamarachchi South‐West

Thunnalai (Tamil: துன்னாலை) is a village in Vadamarachchi South-West, Jaffna District, Northern Province, Sri Lanka. It is located near Thondaman Aru lagoon. It is also in close proximity to Vallipuram. Naga names are found in India. Nagpur, Nagar Kovil, Nagapatnam and Nagaland are examples. Nair, nayakkar, naidu are remnants of Naga heritage. Tamils are a linguistic name; but Nagas are more of a racially based line. Nagas are now integral part of all linguistic tribes.

Thunnalai and Vallipuram formed the northeastern complex of various ruling empires such as Cholas, Pandyas, Sinhalese, Thai, Javanese and Malays. Most of these invaders are kings or princes who made use of the island status of Jaffna to settle and control international trade.

The following sections deal separately with the changing rulers of Thunnalai.

== Overview ==
Location: 9.784801° N 80.239207° E

Part of Thunnalai was under the sea for a long time and seashell deposits can be seen in the rice fields as the evidence of such occurrences. Some of the Ganesh Temple walls are built from these seashells. The soil in these areas are bleached of mineral colour due to inundation with sea water. The northern part of Thunnalai has calcic red latosols used for making pottery which was a cottage industry during the 20th century.

Kaddaiveli Temple and Kaddaiveli Parish are the remnants of the colonial rule. An ancient Sivan temple was demolished before the church was erected.

Thunnalai has ward named Glen which means valley in Welsh language. Vallipuram which is part of point pedro is closest village of Thunnalai.

Thun means fresh water in Nordic languages. Tonlé Sap means fresh water lake in Cambodian languages. With historical links to Thai and Cambodian kingdoms Thunnalai may be name of South East Asian origin.

Place names like Kaligai comes from the original invader's name of Kalinga Magha.

Vallipuram (Sandy City) has a recorded history from the 2nd century BC, in the gold inscription of King Vasabha, where the local ruler is named as "Asagiri", a name confirmed in the Nelugala stone inscription (2nd century BC) as well. The Buddhist list of holy places ("Nampotha") names it as "Vaelipura" or sand city. The exact details of the temple complex are not known, and the famous 'Vallipuram" Buddha statue was found in excavations below a subsequent Hindu Temple. Peter Schalk, a distinguished Swedish Tamil scholar, writes "Vallipuram has very rich archaeological remains that point at an early settlement. It was probably an emporium in the first centuries AD. […] From already dated stones with which we compare this Vallipuram statue, we can conclude that it falls in the 3rd-4th century AD period. During that period, the typical Amaravati-Buddha sculpture was developed." The Buddha statue found here at the Buddhist site was gifted to the King of Thailand by the then British Governor Henry Blake in 1906. The descendants of Arya Chakravarti married into Kalinga Magha family and created a dynasty of Singai-Aryans and ruled from Vallipuram and renamed it as Singai Nagar. However, no historically useful objects, e.g., inscriptions, art or literary works were left by these rulers, and Paranavithana and other historians claim that they paid tribute to the main ruler of the country. See also S. Paranavitana, ``Vallipuram Gold-Plate Inscription of the Regin of Vasabha. Epigraphia Zeylanica, 4 (1936) 229-236. A full discussion has been given recently by Karthigesu Indrapala, Evolution of an Ethnic Identity,(2005), and in an earlier work, 1965 where Dr. Indrapala argued for a flourishing pre-Christian Buddhist civilization in Jaffna, in agreement with Paranavithana, and Mudliyar C. Rasanayakam, Ancient Jaffna.

This place is similar to Nagapatnam where all Asian vessels used it as a stopover point and the Buddhist and Hindu Dagobas are just a resting and worshipping places for the sailors and international traders. Both Nagapatnam and Vallipuram served the powerful kingdoms of China, Siam, Cambodia, Champa (Vietnam) and Java.

== Introduction ==
From time immemorial India was the source of people who settled in Thunnalai. As people came in for the new lands beyond India, they found Jaffna as a place of peace and serenity and void of religious clashes which waged over the centuries. They brought various religions at various times. As Jains, Buddhists, Vaishnavaites, Saivaites and Muslims became the victims, they chose the shores of Jaffna as a refuge.

Rajarata and the Sinhalese had a long history of cultural, religious, and indeed genetic exchange with the kingdoms of southern India; the royal families of the island had, for example, consistently married into the royal families of the Pandyas and Cheras. Invaders such as Anikanga (in 1209) and Parakrama Pandu (in 1212) were often welcomed and accepted. Perhaps the most famous invader had been Elara, around a thousand years previously, who despite conquering the island by force had earned the title of 'dharmaraja' ('Just King') even amongst monks and was regarded as one of the best examples of governance in the history of the country. All these monarchs had incorporated the local nobilities into their rule and shown respect and deference towards the native faith, Buddhism. Thus one of the chief reasons for the particular loathing held by the Culavamsa for Magha was his utter refusal to accommodate either the faith or the culture of the native Sinhalese population.

The Culavamsa provides Kalinga Magha with an impressive and detailed introduction, something which the normally laconic text very rarely does. In Chapter LXXX, we are told that

in consequence of the enormously accumulated, various evil deeds of the dwellers in Lanka, the devatas who were everywhere entrusted with the protection of Lanka, failed to carry out this protection, [so] there landed a man who held to a false creed, whose heart rejoiced in bad statesmanship, who was a forest fire for the burning down of bushes in the forest of the good...who was a sun whose action closed the rows of night lotus flowers [that represent] good doctrine...and [was] a moon for destroying the grace of the...day lotuses that...[represent]peace... (a man) by [the] name [of] Magha, an unjust king sprung from the Kalinga line...'.

Nothing is known of Magha before his arrival in Rajarata with an army of 24,000 from Kalinga, nor on what basis he claimed the throne of Lanka. Certainly in the years before his arrival the Sinhalese kingdom had progressed into an advanced state of political decay, making its way through more than nine monarchs in twenty years and suffering at least three invasions. It has been speculated that Magha may have had a claim through the Kalingan dynasty established by Nissanka Malla in 1187. Whatever his pretext however he swiftly lost any potential support amongst the populace by the sheer violence of his invasion.

King Chandrabhanu was a straits Malay chief/pirate/king who stormed the Sri Lankan port of Trincomalee with Malay foot soldiers from both sides of the straits to get the `tooth` of Buddha to legitimize his claim to a kingdom back in his country. Chandrabhanu was defeated, but then sent for mercenaries from South India and wrestled the northern half of Sri Lanka away from the Sinhalese kings. However Chandrabhanu was able to establish an independent regime in the north of the island, but in 1258 he was attacked and subjugated by Pandya.

== Tamil trade ==
Between the 2nd and 12th centuries AD, the Cholas and Pallavas did extensive sea trade throughout Southeast Asia and China. Various countries periodically came under Tamil rule. At the beginning of the 2nd century AD, Pallava prince Kaundinyan of Kanchipuram became the first king of Cambodia. Much of the historical accounts of the time can be seen in bas reliefs (carvings on walls similar to Mamallapuram wall carvings) at sites like the Angkor Wat and Angkor Thom. The fighting arts and styles can be clearly seen on these walls. At the Prambanan and Borobodur temples of Java Indonesia the same can be seen in the bas reliefs of the Tamil martial arts fighting skills used by ancient warriors. During the 10th century AD the Chola Empire was at its peak with their expansion in Southeast Asia. Under king Raja Raja Chozhan parts of Burma, Isthmus of Kra, Malaysia, Sumatra, and Java were under his rule. Much of the elements of Tamil culture introduced there were dance, cuisine, writing, literature, architecture, and the martial arts.

== Chavakam ==
Chaavakam is the Tamilized name for the Island of Java which is a part of Indonesia today. Yaava-dveepa or Jaava-dveepa is the Sanskrit name for that island. The name, which means The Island of Millets, is found in early literature like Ramayana. For a long time in history, Java remained the political and cultural centre of maritime Southeast Asia. Hence, the word Chaavakam stood for the entire region that included today's Indonesia, Malaysia, Singapore, Brunei, Philippines and East Timor. Chaavakar, which originally meant the people of Java, was also a collective term for all who were later identified as Malays. Javanese is the language of Java. Malay (modern day Bahasa Melayu and Bahasa Indonesia) was historically the language of the Straits of Malacca and is the official language of present day Malaysia and Indonesia

== Chandrabhanu ==
From the Sri Lankan materials, this Chandrabhanu was a Javakan king from Tambralinga who had invaded Sri Lankan in 1247. His navy launched an assault on the southern part of the island but defeated by the Sri Lankan king. However Chandrabhanu was able to establish an independent regime in the north of the island, but in 1258 he was attacked and subjugated by Pandya. Chandrabhanu Sridhamaraja was the king of Patama vamsa (lotus dynasty). He began to reign in 1230, he had the Phrae Boromadhatu reparation and celebration in the same year. Chandrabhanu Sridhamaraja brought Tambralinga reached the pinnacle of its power in the mid-13th century. Tambralinga is identified with Ligor, which is in the Isthmus part of Thailand, close to Kedah (Kadaaram) of Malaysia. The capital was Pattani (pronounced Paddani). In Tamil, Paddinam means city, especially a coastal city.

== Invasion ==
From the Sri Lankan materials, this Chandrabhanu was a Javakan king from Tambralinga who had invaded Sri Lankan in 1247. His navy launched an assault on the southern part of the island but defeated by the Sri Lankan king. However Chandrabhanu was able to establish an independent regime in the north of the island, but in 1258 he was attacked and subjugated by Pandya. In 1262 Chandrabhanu launched another attack on the south of the island, his army strengthened this time by the addition of Tamil and Sinhalese forces, only to be defeated when Pandya sided with the Sri Lankan side Chandrabhanu himself was killed in the fighting. Chandrabhanu's son retained control over the northern kingdom, though subservient to Pandya, but this regime too had disappeared by the end of the 14th century.

== Tooth Relic ==
Parakramabahu II brought down the Relics from Beligala in a procession with great veneration and placed them in a shrine built near the palace at the Damabadeniya rock According to the text Dalada Pujavaliya, Parakramabahu conducted the Relics to Srivardhanapura, the city of his birth, and held a great ritual worship. He was responsible for the building of the Tooth Relic shrine at the Vijayasundararama at Dambadeniya, where the Relic was deposited and the king conducted festive rituals. The peaceful and prosperous time under Parakramabahu was disturbed by the invasion of Chandrabhanu of Java. However, the king was able to expel the enemy and bring back the country to a stable status again. Chadrabhanu of Java invaded the country for the second time and after defeating the local sub-ruler at Yapahuva, demanded the Tooth Relic from Vijayabahu of Dambadeniya. Yet, the Sri Lankan ruler was able to defeat him and bring peace to the island again.

== Assimilated Javanese ==
This is a leftover from the fact that the town was a `Javaka Kottai` - `Chavaka Kottai` - `Chavaka Cheri` (founded as fort of Malay/Javanese soldiers during King Chandrabhanu's days) during the pre-colonial times. Those Malay/Javanese who assimilated to become Tamils just maintained their age-old traditions even during the colonial and postcolonial time frame.

== Arya Chakaravarthi ==
After Chandrabhanu, the area was passed on to a Pandyan deputy. Mahawamsa tells about several children of Chandrabhanu who became the rulers of the Sinhala section of Sri Lanka. It looks as though the children of Chandrabhanu finally became the kings of Sri Lanka (under different names) even though the father could not achieve it.

Jaffna went to a Brahmin ruler from Rameshwaram in the service of the Pandya king named Arya Chakaravarthi (a name of a family). That family managed to create and hold on to Jaffna and its environs as a separate kingdom for almost 400 years.

== Future Plan for Thunnalai ==
As the War Relief Fund from International donors reaches Sri Lanka there are some plans to rebuild the broken infrastructure of Jaffna. Thunnalai may benefit from it by having a university campus build in its Vallipuram Temple area with the ancient holy sites.

Jaffna Development Blueprint
