= Tadduvankoddi =

Coordinates: 9°30′N 80°25′E

- Interactive map of Tadduvankoddi
- Country: Sri Lanka
- Province: Northern Province
- Time zone: UTC+5:30 (Sri Lanka Standard Time)

Tadduvankoddi is a small town in Sri Lanka. It is located within Northern Province. It is located next to the A9 Highway, and Elephant Pass.

== See also ==
- List of towns in Northern Province, Sri Lanka
