= Adukkalamoddai =

Coordinates: 8°53′N 80°01′E

- Interactive map of Adukkalamoddai
- Country: Sri Lanka
- Province: Northern Province
- Time zone: UTC+5:30 (Sri Lanka Standard Time)

Adukkalamoddai is a small town in Sri Lanka. It is located within Northern Province.

Latitude: 8° 52' 59.99" N

Longitude: 80° 00' 60.00" E

Nearest city to this article: Vavuniya

== See also ==
- List of towns in Northern Province, Sri Lanka
