= Thikkam =

Coordinates: 9°50′N 80°12′E

- Interactive map of Thikkam
- Country: Sri Lanka
- Province: Northern Province
- Time zone: UTC+5:30 (Sri Lanka Standard Time)

Thikkam is a coastal village in Jaffna District, Northern Province, Sri Lanka. It is known for its distillery which produces palmyrah toddy.

In May 1987, it was the site of military conflict during the Vadamarachchi Operation carried out by the Sri Lanka Army against the Tamil Tigers and the Eelam Revolutionary Organisation of Students.

== See also ==
- List of towns in Northern Province, Sri Lanka
