= Achelu =

Coordinates: 9°44′N 80°04′E

- Interactive map of Achelu
- Country: Sri Lanka
- Province: Northern Province
- Time zone: UTC+5:30 (Sri Lanka Standard Time)

Achchelu is a small town in Sri Lanka. It is located within Northern Province. Achchu (in Tamil அச்சு) means middle, Elu (in Tamil ஏழு) means Seven. Because, this town is located middle of the seven villages in Jaffna.

== See also ==
- List of towns in Northern Province, Sri Lanka
