= Vadduvakallu =

Coordinates: 9°17′N 80°48′E

Vadduvakal
- Interactive map of Vadduvakal
- Country: Sri Lanka
- Province: Northern Province
- District: Mullaitivu
- Time zone: UTC+5:30 (Sri Lanka Standard Time)

Vadduvakallu or Vadduvakal is a small town in Mullaitivu in Sri Lanka. It is located within Northern Province.

== See also ==
- List of towns in Northern Province, Sri Lanka
