= Vattirayan =

- Location within Sri Lanka
- Coordinates: 9°36′N 80°25′E
- Country: Sri Lanka
- Province: Northern Province
- Elevation: 0 m (0 ft)
- Time zone: UTC+5:30 (Sri Lanka Standard Time)

Vattirayan is a small town in Sri Lanka. It is located within Northern Province.

== See also ==
- List of towns in Northern Province, Sri Lanka
