= Vanchiyankulam =

Coordinates: 8°52′N 79°57′E

- Interactive map of Vanchiyankulam
- Country: Sri Lanka
- Province: Northern Province
- Time zone: UTC+5:30 (Sri Lanka Standard Time)

Vanchiyankulam is a village in Sri Lanka. It is located within the Mannar District of the Northern Province and as of 2012 it had a population of 511.

== See also ==
- List of towns in Northern Province, Sri Lanka
