= Thatchchanthoppu =

Coordinates: 9°39′N 80°06′E

- Interactive map of Thatchchanthoppu
- Country: Sri Lanka
- Province: Northern Province
- Time zone: UTC+5:30 (Sri Lanka Standard Time)

Thatchchanthoppu is a small town in Sri Lanka, located within the Northern Province.

== See also ==
- List of towns in Northern Province, Sri Lanka
