= Vellankulam =

Vellankulam வெள்ளாங்குளம்
- Location within Sri Lanka
- Coordinates: 9°11′N 80°7′E
- Country: Sri Lanka
- Province: Northern Province
- Time zone: UTC+5:30 (Sri Lanka Standard Time)

Vellankulam is a small town in Sri Lanka. It is located within the Northern Province. The village of Vellankulam is located in Mannar District, 340 kilometers north of Colombo. This region was greatly affected by the Sri Lankan Civil War, and as a result many of the roads are in poor condition. Due to the neglected condition of the roads, it takes about nine hours to reach the village from Colombo.

== See also ==
- List of towns in Northern Province, Sri Lanka
