= Veravil =

Coordinates: 9°21′N 80°05′E

- Town
- Interactive map of Veravil
- Country: Sri Lanka
- Province: Northern Province
- Time zone: UTC+5:30 (Sri Lanka Standard Time)

Veravil is a small town in Sri Lanka. It is located within Northern Province.

== See also ==
- List of towns in Northern Province, Sri Lanka
