= Vayittiyankudiyiruppu =

Coordinates: 9°03′N 79°51′E

Puthukkudiyiruppu புதுக்குடியிருப்பு පුදුකුඩිඉරුප්පු
- Interactive map of Puthukkudiyiruppu
- Country: Sri Lanka
- Province: Northern Province
- Time zone: UTC+5:30 (Sri Lanka Standard Time)
- Postal code: 41000

Puthukkudiyiruppu is a small town in Sri Lanka. It is located within Northern Province.

== Schools ==
1. Al-Hira Maha Vidyalayam
2. Al-Hanim pre school

== Mosques ==
1. Mohideen Jummah Mosque (Puthukkudiyiruppu)
2. Mohideen Jummah Mosque (Konarpannai)
3. Masjid Al Huda (Thaika)
4. Ibadur Rahman (Thaika)
5. Masjid School (Thaika)
6. Minara Padu (Thaika)
