= Vaddakkandal =

- Location in Sri Lanka
- Coordinates: 8°54′17″N 80°02′04″E
- Country: Sri Lanka
- Province: Northern Province
- Time zone: UTC+5:30 (Sri Lanka Standard Time)

Vaddakkandal is a small town in Sri Lanka. It is located within Northern Province.

== See also ==
- List of towns in Northern Province, Sri Lanka
