= Urani (town) =

Urani Sinna urani Periya urani
- Country: Sri Lanka
- Province: Eastern Province
- Time zone: UTC+5:30 (Sri Lanka Standard Time)

Urani is a small town located in Batticaloa district Sri Lanka. It is located within Eastern province.

== See also ==
- List of towns in Northern Province, Sri Lanka
