= Thunukkai =

Thunukkai துணுக்காய்
- Town
- Location within Northern Province
- Coordinates: 9°08′0″N 80°17′0″E
- Country: []]
- Province: Northern
- District: Mullaitivu
- DS Division: Thunukkai

Thunukkai (Tamil: துணுக்காய், Sinhala: තුනුක්කායි) is a town in the Mullaitivu District, Sri Lanka. It is located about 17 km from Mankulam & 4 km from Mallavi.
