= Kuppilan =

Kuppilan குப்பிளான் ඛුපුලානව
- Town
- Location within Northern Province
- Coordinates: 9°45′0″N 80°2′0″E
- Country: Sri Lanka
- Province: Northern
- District: Jaffna
- DS Division: Valikamam South West

Kuppuzhaan or Kuppilan is a village in the Valikaamam South division of Jaffna district. The toponym nowadays is often written as Kuppizhaan. It is an agricultural village consisting mainly of vegetable farms, Tobacco, Palmyra gardens. Most of the people are Hindus.
