= Viraval, Navsari =

Part of a Navsari, Gujarat, India

Viraval
- city
- Location in Gujarat, India Viraval (India)
- Coordinates: 20.9451°N 72.9344°E
- Country: India
- State: Gujarat
- District: Navsari
- Elevation: 3 m (9.8 ft)

Population (2001)
  - Total: 8,000

Languages
  - Official: Gujarati, Hindi
- Time zone: UTC+5:30 (IST)
- PIN: 396463
- Vehicle registration: GJ
- Website: gujaratindia.com

Viraval (also known as Viraval Village) is a part of Navsari Nagarpalika located in south Gujarat, India.

Viraval village is located in Navsari Tehsil of Navsari district in Gujarat, India. It is situated 3 km (1.9 mi) from Navsari, which is both district & sub-district headquarters of Viraval village. As per 2009 stats, Viraval village is also a gram panchayat.

The total geographical area of the village is 501.95 hectares (1,240.3 acres). Viraval has a total population of around 9,000 people. There are about 1,375 houses in Viraval village. Navsari is the nearest town to Viraval which is approximately 3 km (1.9 mi) away.

Shree Ram temple, Jaldevi ma temple and BOB bank are also located in Viraval.
