= Achchankulam =

Coordinates: 8°50′N 79°56′E

- Interactive map of Achchankulam
- Country: Sri Lanka
- Province: Northern Province
- Time zone: UTC+5:30 (Sri Lanka Standard Time)

Achchankulam is a small town in Sri Lanka. It is located within Northern Province.
