= Uyilankulam =

- Country: Sri Lanka
- Province: Northern Province
- District: Mannar

Area
  - Total: 0.77 sq mi (2 km^{2})
- Time zone: UTC+5:30 (Sri Lanka Standard Time)
- Postal code: 41000

Uyilankulam is a small town in Sri Lanka. It is located within the Mannar District of the Northern Province.

== See also ==
- List of towns in Northern Province, Sri Lanka
