= Mallavi =

Mallavi மல்லாவி මල්ලවි
- Town
- Location within Northern Province
- Coordinates: 9°08′0″N 80°17′0″E
- Country: Sri Lanka
- Province: Northern
- District: Mullaitivu
- DS Division: Thunukkai

Mallavi is a town in the Mullaitivu District, Sri Lanka. It is located about 13 kilometres (8.1 mi) from Mankulam and 4 kilometres (2.5 mi) from Thunukkai. It has a population of about 5,000 and a developing education and healthcare system.
