= Manalkadu =

Manamkadu
- Village
- Location within Northern Province Location within Sri Lanka
- Coordinates: 9°35′0″N 80°18′0″E
- Country: Sri Lanka
- Province: Northern
- District: Kilinochchi
- DS Division: Pachchilaipalli

Manalkadu or Manalkaadu is a village in Kilinochchi District, Sri Lanka. In Tamil it translates to sand-bush, referring the small desert in the area.

== See also ==
- Vallipuram
