= Adampan =

- Location within Northern Province Location within Sri Lanka
- Coordinates: 8.9418°N 80.0013°E
- Country: Sri Lanka
- Province: Northern Province
- Time zone: UTC+5:30 (Sri Lanka Standard Time)

Adampan is a small town in Sri Lanka. It is located within Northern Province.

== See also ==
- List of towns in Northern Province, Sri Lanka
