= Nagar Kovil =

Nagar Kovil நாகர்கோயில்
- Town
- Location within Northern Province
- Coordinates: 9°42′02″N 80°18′31″E
- Country: Sri Lanka
- Province: Northern
- District: Jaffna
- DS Division: Vadamarachchi East

Nagar Kovil, alternatively spelled as Nagarcoil (Tamil: நாகர்கோயில்), is a small town in Jaffna District, Sri Lanka. Its name translates to "Temple of Nagas" in Tamil.

There is an ancient town in the Kanyakumari district of Tamil Nadu with the same name as Nagarcoil.

The beach has the remains of a large Ayyanaar temple. Once it was an Aaseevagam centre for theological debates and is now under the Indian Ocean. The temple built along the Assevagam centre also was taken away by the ocean.

The Murugan temple is in the middle of the town. Thaipoosam festival is celebrated grandly with the paternity of nearby villages.

== See also ==
- Nagarcoil (Tamil Nadu)
- Vallipuram
- Manalkadu
- Nagarcoil Forward Defence Line
