= Maankulam (Sri Lanka) =

Maankulam மாங்குளம் මන්කුලම
- Town
- Location within Northern Province
- Coordinates: 9°07′45″N 80°26′45″E
- Country: Sri Lanka
- Province: Northern
- District: Mullaitivu
- DS Division: Oddusuddan

Population (2012)
  - Total: 1,651

Maankulam or Mankulam is located in northern Sri Lanka, about 1.5 hours drive south of City of Jaffna.

== Transport ==
The major road A9 and a railway line connecting North and South of Sri Lanka goes through Maankulam. Maankulam is also located few hours drive south of Kilinochchi and few hours drive north of Vavuniya. Highway A34 connects Maankulam to eastern coastal City of Mullaitivu. Mankulam railway station re-opened in 2013.

== In popular culture ==
Maankulam was one of the towns featured in the film Kannathil Muthamittal (2001), directed by Mani Ratnam.
