= Laksiri Waduge =

Sri Lankan army general (born 1965)

Major General Laksiri Waduge RWP, RSP, VSV, USP ලක්සිරි වඩුගේ
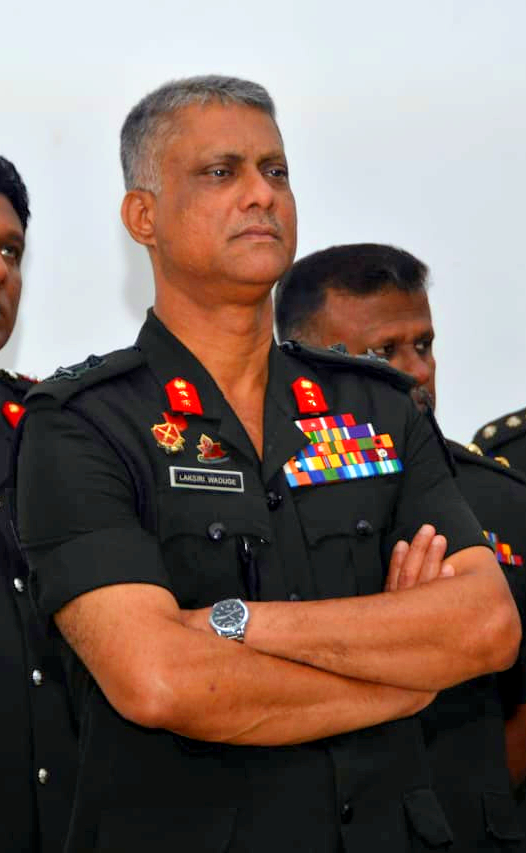
- Born: 16 April 1965 (age 61)
- Military career
- Allegiance: Sri Lanka
- Branch: Sri Lanka Army
- Service years: 1985–2020
- Rank: Major General
- Unit: Sri Lanka Sinha Regiment
- Commands: Security Forces Headquarters – Central, Military Intelligence Corps, 52 Division, Director General - Operations & Security - OCDS, Infantry Training Centre - Minneriya, 58 Division, 62 Division, Area Headquarters - Welioya, Mechanized Infantry Brigade, SL Contingent United Nation Peace Keeping Operation Battalion, 553 Brigade, 524 Brigade, 8th Battalion - Sri Lanka Sinha Regiment, 7th Battalion - Sri Lanka Sinha Regiment,
- Conflicts: Sri Lankan Civil War, First Battle of Elephant Pass
- Awards: Rana Wickrama Padakkama, Rana Sura Padakkama, Vishista Seva Vibhushanaya, Uttama Seva Padakkama, Desha Putra Sammanaya

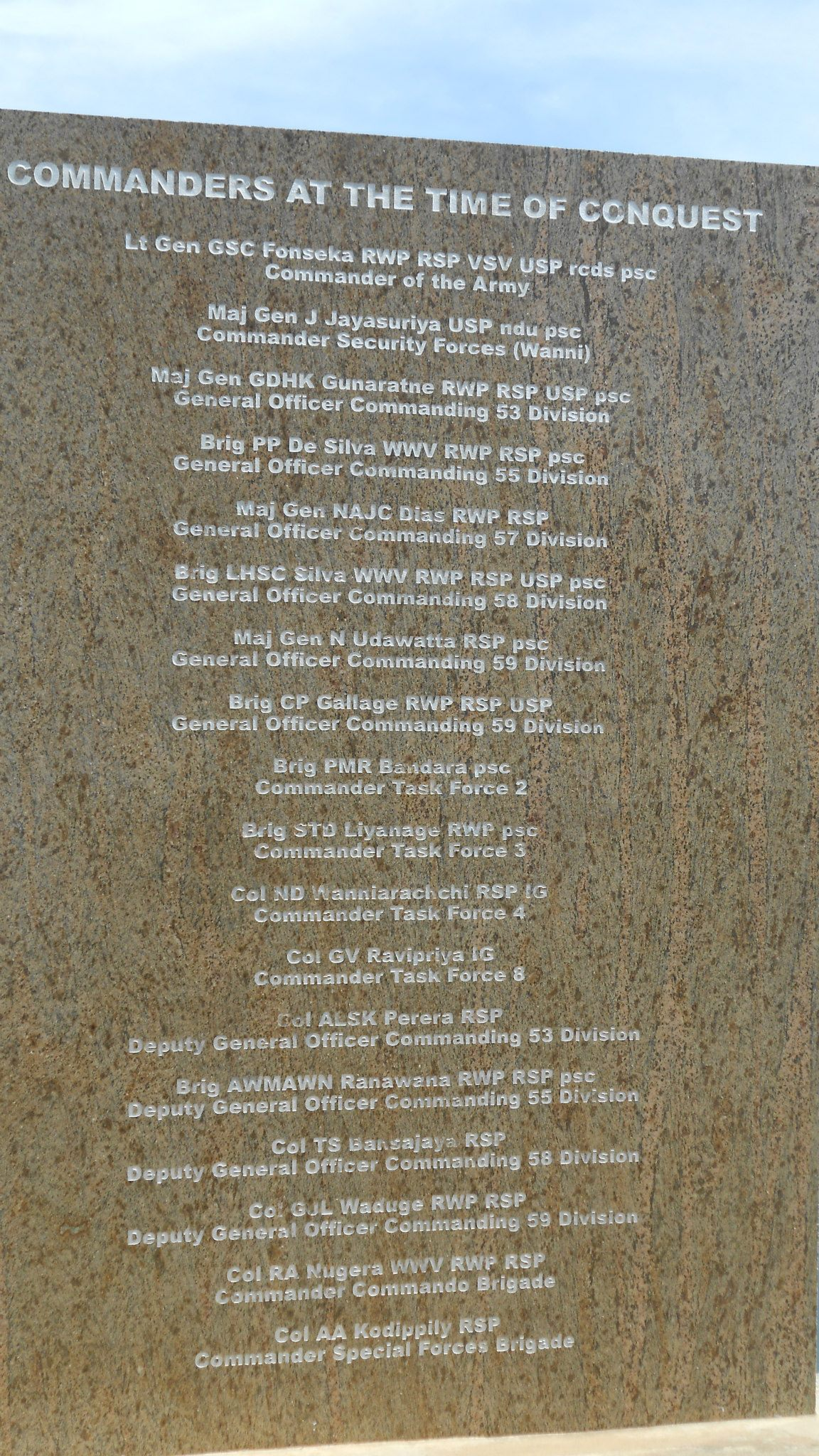
Major General Laksiri Waduge RWP RSP VSV USP ndu (Colonel GJL Waduge RWP RSP then) named in a monument unveiled in Pudukuduirppu naming commanders at the time of the conquest.

Major General Galwaduge Janaka Laksiri Waduge, RWP, RSP, VSV, USP, ndu (Sinhala: ගල්වඩුගේ ජානක ලක්සිරි වඩුගේ) (born 16 April 1965) is a retired Sri Lankan army general. He was the 10th commander, Security Forces Headquarters – Central and the former colonel commandant of Military Intelligence Corps. He retired from active service in 2020 upon reaching the mandatory retirement age of 55 for Sri Lankan Armed Forces personnel.

== Early life and education ==
Janaka Laksiri Waduge was born on 16 April 1965 in Rathmalana to Galwaduge Steephen and Mrs. Karunawathi. He studied at Gurukula College, Kelaniya.

== Military career ==
On 14 June 1985, Waduge joined the regular force of the Sri Lanka Army to Officer Cadet Intake SSC 05 of Sri Lanka Military Academy, Diyathalawa. On successfully completing his officer training, he was commissioned on 9 February 1986 and was posted to the Sri Lanka Sinha Regiment.

During his military career, he held many command and staff appointments such as platoon commander, company commander, general staff officer III, Staff Officer II – Admin, second in command, commanding officer of 7th & 8th Battalions of Sri Lanka Sinha Regiment, staff officer I admin, general staff officer I, brigade commander, contingent commander United Nation Peace Keeping Operation Battalion of Sri Lanka Sinha Regiment in Haiti, area commander, general officer commanding, commandant – Infantry Training Centre – Minneriya, director general - operations & security at Office of the Chief of Defence Staff, general officer commanding 52 Division. In 2019 he was appointed commander, Security Forces - Central and colonel commandant of the Military Intelligence Corps.

He was also the exercise director for the joint Tri-service Mega Field Training Exercise (FTX), "Exercise - Cormorant Strike X - 2019" held in September 2019 across the island.

Waduge has completed a number of overseas and local military courses such as Battalion Support Weapon Course at Infantry Training Centre – Minneriya, Young Officers Course in India, Junior Command Course in Bangladesh, Basic Laws of Armed Conflict Course in Malaysia, Multinational Forces Standard Operation Procedure Course in Thailand, Asian Regional Forum (ARF) Peace Keeping Experts Programme in China, Senior Command Course at the Army War College, Mhow and Defense & Strategic Studies Course at the PLA National Defence University.

== Role during humanitarian operations ==
Laksiri Waduge played a key role in the humanitarian operations which took place during the last phase of the Sri Lankan Civil War. He served as the deputy general officer commanding, 59 Division during the Sri Lanka Army offensive in the Wanni region.

The 59 Division was tasked with fighting its way to recapture the rebel strongholds of Mullaitivu from the Welioya sector. The division captured much of the district of Mullaitivu, the major Liberation Tigers of Tamil Eelam (LTTE) One Four base and finally the town of Mullaitivu during the Mullaitivu Battle in early 2009. The significance of his role in the 2009 war was acknowledged in an article in the Nation which named him with other top military figures as being instrumental in winning the war.

== Military awards and decorations ==
His military awards and decorations includes the Rana Wickrama Padakkama, the Rana Sura Padakkama for his gallantry and exceptional valour in battle field and the Vishishta Seva Vibhushanaya and the Uttama Seva Padakkama for his exceptionally conduct and distinguished service. He has also been awarded Desha Putra Sammanaya, Eastern Humanitarian Operations Medal, Northern Humanitarian Operations Medal, Purna Bhumi Padakkama, North and East Operations Medal, Riviresa Campaign Services Medal, 50th Independence Anniversary Commemoration Medal, Sri Lanka Army 50th Anniversary Medal, Sri Lanka Armed Services Long Service Medal, Sewabhimani Padakkama, Sewa Padakkama, Videsha Seva Padakkama, United Nations Stabilisation Mission in Haiti Medal.
