= Battle of Mullaitivu (1996) =

Part of the Sri Lankan Civil War

Battle of Mullaitivu முல்லைத்தீவுச் சமர் මුලතිව් සටන
- Part of Eelam War III and the Sri Lankan Civil War
Date	18–25 July 1996
Location	Mullaitivu, Sri Lanka 09°15′N 80°49′E
Result	LTTE victory (see Aftermath section)

Belligerents
Sri Lanka	Liberation Tigers of Tamil Eelam

Commanders and leaders
Anuruddha Ratwatte; Rohan Daluwatte; A. F. Lafir †; T. R. A. Aliba (MIA); Raj Vijayasiri (WIA)	V. Prabhakaran; Colonel Balraj; Colonel Soosai

Units involved
Sri Lanka Armed Forces; Sri Lanka Army; Vijayabahu Infantry Regiment; Sri Lanka Sinha Regiment; Special Forces Regiment; Commando Regiment; Sri Lanka Light Infantry; Gemunu Watch	Liberation Tigers of Tamil Eelam; Charles Anthony Brigade; Jeyanthan Brigade

Strength
1,407 (Mullaitivu garrison) ~1000 (Relief force)	~2,000

Casualties and losses
1,498 dead	315 dead, including 11 Sea Black Tigers (LTTE claimed)
- Location of base in Northern Province, Sri Lanka

The Battle of Mullaitivu (Tamil: முல்லைத்தீவுச் சமர், romanized: Mullaittīvup Pōr; Sinhala: මුලතිව් සටන Mulativ Saṭana), also known as the First Battle of Mullaitivu and codenamed Operation Unceasing Waves-1 (Tamil: ஓயாத அலைகள்-1 நடவடிக்கை, romanized: Ōyāta Alaikaḷ-1 Naṭavaṭikkai), was a battle between the militant Liberation Tigers of Tamil Eelam (LTTE or Tamil Tigers) and the Sri Lankan military during the Sri Lankan Civil War for control of the military base in Mullaitivu in north-eastern Sri Lanka.

The base which contained an understrength infantry brigade was overrun by the LTTE on 18 July 1996, in the days that followed, a combined operation undertaken by all three armed forces failed to rescue the brigade as it had been completely destroyed by the time the relief force reached what was left of the installations of the 25 "Mullaitivu" Brigade, the Sri Lankan military abandoned the town of Mullaitivu, and control of much of Mullaitivu District, to the LTTE on 25 July 1996. Around 1,500 Sri Lankan troops were killed or unaccounted for (MIA) and large amounts of military equipment captured by the LTTE. 315 LTTE fighters were also killed.

== Background ==
After losing control of the Jaffna Peninsula in late 1995 and early 1996 the LTTE retreated to the Vanni on the mainland, saving most of their weapons and establishing their headquarters in the town of Kilinochchi.

=== The Mullaitivu military base ===
With the escalation of the Sri Lankan Civil War, the Sri Lanka Army established a permanent detachment at Mullaitivu which expanded in to army camp of a company strength until the LTTE laid siege to it in June 1990. The isolated camp was relieved when the Sri Lankan military launched its first amphibious operation Operation Sea Breeze under the command of Major General Denzil Kobbekaduwa which successfully relieved the besieged army camp and expanded it, during which the entire population of the town of Mullaitivu fled the town. The base expanded over the years to incorporate the entire town. It became one of the largest military bases in Sri Lanka, occupying an area of 2,900m by 1,500m with a perimeter of 8,500m. The base was surrounded by the sea to the east, the Nanthi Kadal lagoon to west and dense vegetation to the north and south.

The base was isolated with the nearest base being at Manal Aru and Weli Oya, some 35 km to the south. There was no overland supply route to the base and all supplies had to be brought in by sea and air, something that the navy and air force struggled with. Brigadier Kumban Bohran, Brigade Commander, 25 "Mullaitivu" Brigade had strengthened the Mullaitivu base in 1995 and a contingency plan was drawn up in the event of an overnight attack. Under the plan reinforcements would arrive by sea and air the following morning. Radars and two generators, one acting as a back-up, were installed.

The base was responsible for monitoring the Sea Tigers, the LTTE's naval division, and smuggling. It was the headquarters of the army's 25 Brigade and was under the command of Colonel Lawrence Fernando who was the officiating brigade commander (Note: Another source states that the 215 Brigade was based at Mullaitivu.). The 25 Brigade consisted of two infantry battalions, which were the 6th battalion of the Vijayabahu Infantry Regiment (6VIR), commanded by Major T. R. A. Aliba, and the 9th battalion of the Sri Lanka Sinha Regiment (9SLSR) commanded by Major W. M. S. Gunarathna. Stationed at the base was a detachments of the 4th Field Regiment, Sri Lanka Artillery armed with two 122 mm Type 54 howitzers, as well as other support units. The base's strength was 1,407 just prior to the battle (1,268 army; 9 navy; 49 police; 81 civilians).

== Prelude ==
Traditionally July had been a month of importance to the LTTE, who commemorate the Black July that followed the ambush of Four Four Bravo which is considered the start of the civil war and the successful first Black Tiger attack by Captain Miller. July is marked with LTTE major attacks such as the that of the Weli Oya garrison in 1995. On 4 July 1996, a female suicide bomber detonated a bomb at Stanley Road, Jaffna targeting Nimal Siripala de Silva, Minister of Housing, Construction and Public Utilities at building opening, killing Brigadier Ananda Hamangoda, Brigade commander, 512 "Jaffna" Brigade and 22 others.

=== LTTE preparations ===
The LTTE believed that the Sri Lankan military were planning to attack Kilinochchi in mid July 1996. In order to forestall such an attack the LTTE started preparing plans to attack the military base in Mullaitivu. However, in order to divert attention away from Mullaitivu, the LTTE started amassing cadres near the military bases at Elephant Pass and Pooneryn. In late June 1996 they started moving coffins within sight of military observation posts in order to raise suspicions in the military.

The LTTE's preparations took many weeks to complete, with cadres from Charles Anthony Brigade and the Jeyanthan Brigade joining a force that was training to attack military base, practicing on mock ups of the base. LTTE leader V. Prabhakaran had been personally involved in the preparations for the attack which was coded named Operation Unceasing Waves. Colonel Balraj was responsible for co-ordinating the LTTE operation.

In May 1996 the military monitored a large build up of LTTE forces near the base which was placed on a high alert. The LTTE lost 5 recon soldiers during their reconnaissance mission on the base. In addition to these, they also lost 8 more recon soldiers while they were leading the Tamil Tigers' attack teams into the base complex.

== Battle ==
=== Base over-run ===
At around 1:30 am on 18 July 1996 approximately 2,000 (Note: Another source states that 1,000 LTTE cadres attacked the military base.) LTTE cadres attacked the military base in Mullaitivu from the north and south whilst the Sea Tigers attacked from the eastern shoreline, while the whole base was subject to a constant barrage of mortar fire. Only troops tasked with sentry duty manned the bunkers in the fortified camp when the attack took place. On the day of the attack the two most senior officers of the base, the brigade commander Colonel Lawrence Fernando and his deputy Major Gunaratne were away in Colombo on duty leave. This left Major Aliba in command of the base with Major W. C. H. Dabarera in command of the 9SLSR. The initial wave of attackers breached the perimeter, while LTTE carders who had infiltrated the base began attacking predetermined targets within the base. These carders concentrated their attack on the artillery sites and armouries, capturing them within an hour. They then focused the attack on the brigade headquarters. After eight hours of heavy fighting the LTTE entered the center of the base, having over-run the forward defence lines and clusters of mini-bases. The tall communication tower at the base was destroyed, severing radio communications between the base and the Army Headquarters. By dawn the LTTE began removing weapons and equipment it had captured by this point.

The LTTE's attack was paused just short of the heart of the base, the operational headquarters of the 6VIR. Fearing death if captured, soldiers from the 6VIR, hoping that they could hold on until a relief force arrived. The LTTE commanders were given orders to regroup and wait for nightfall before attacking the heart of the base.

=== Operation Thrivida Pahara ===
News of the attack soon reached Colombo and within hours of the start of the attack the three service commanders - Lieutenant General Rohan Daluwatte (army), Rear Admiral Mohan Samarasekera (navy) and Air Marshall Oliver Ranasinghe (air force) - were flown to the Elephant Pass military base to oversee the rescue effort. The trio, together with other senior military officers, put into motion Operation Thrivida Pahara (Operation Three Strikes) which began before dawn on 18 July 1996.

Troops based in Jaffna Peninsula were boarded onto a merchant vessel at Kankesanthurai and dispatched to Mullaitivu, 30 kilometres (19 miles) away. When they arrived in Mullaitivu they were to transfer to a naval landing craft, move closer to the shore, transfer to dinghies and make an amphibious landing on the beach-head.

Meanwhile, the navy's eastern command and the air force's eastern zonal command, both based in Trincomalee, joined the rescue attempt. The air force's MI-24 helicopter gunships, Pucara bombers and Kfir interceptor jets began strafing LTTE in and around the base.

275 commandos from the 1st battalion of the Special Forces Regiment, led by Lieutenant Colonel A. F. Lafir, were dispatched to the area using MI-17 troop transport helicopters. They were conveyed from their base in Maduru Oya via Trincomalee and dropped at Alampil, 15 kilometres (9.3 miles) south of the Mullaitivu base, at 4.30 pm on 18 July 1996. The commandos were to establish a beach-head so that the infantry reinforcements from Jaffna peninsula could make an amphibious landing but as they advanced towards the base they were slowed down by heavy resistance from the LTTE. Kfir jets were called into support the advancing commandos but they ended up firing on the commandos. 20 soldiers were killed and more than 60 were wounded as a result of friendly fire. Brigade commander, 25 Brigade and base commander Colonel Lawrence Fernando, who had been accompanying Lafir and the commandos, was left wounded and unconscious following an attack by Kfir jets.

The LTTE, who were now fighting on two fronts, concentrated their efforts on the base which was entirely captured by the evening of 18 July 1996, overrunning the last pockets of resistance.

The 2nd battalion of the Special Forces Regiment, led by Colonel Raj Vijayasiri, who had been carrying out operations in Kudumbimalai/Thoppigala, were dispatched on the evening of 18 July 1996, via Punanai and Trincomalee, to support the 1st battalion. The 2nd battalion managed to make radio contact with a group of isolated troops inside the base. Lafir was fatally wounded on the morning of 19 July 1996 when shrapnel from mortar fire pierced his brain - he died later that morning. 36 (Note: Another source states that two officers and 32 soldiers from the 1st battalion Special Forces Regiment were killed.) other commandos were killed whilst 60 more were wounded.

As 18 July 1996 drew to a close the three service commanders re-located to Trincomalee. The Joint Operations Headquarters, which had been functioning from Anuradhapura, was moved temporarily to SLAF China Bay near Trincomalee.

After much delay, the infantry reinforcements from Jaffna peninsula reached the high seas off Mullaitivu at dawn on 19 July 1996 but it was afternoon when they began moving towards the coast, escorted by navy patrol boats. At around 4.30pm the SLNS Ranaviru, one of the escort vessels, was surrounded by six Sea Tiger boats. Ranaviru managed to destroy two Sea Tiger boats before a third rammed into her, causing the ship to explode and killing 34 of her crew. Only seven bodies could be recovered from the seas in the ensuing gun battle. The attempts to land troops by sea were aborted.

MI-17 helicopters trying to drop troops near Alampil encountered heavy resistance from the LTTE so a decision was made to drops troops at another location. On 20 July 1996 one of the MI-17 helicopters sustained damage to its fuel pipeline following fire from LTTE but managed to safely return to a neighbouring base.

The two Special Forces Regiment battalions eventually linked up and established a beach-head 5 kilometres (3.1 miles) south of Mullaitivu. The navy landed troops belonging to the 2nd battalion of the Commando Regiment, 6th battalion of the Sri Lanka Light Infantry and 7th battalion of the Gemunu Watch at the beach-head on 21 July 1996. The troops came under heavy mortar fire from the LTTE and it wasn't until 23 July 1996 that they started advancing, under heavy LTTE fire, towards the base. When they reached the southern perimeter of the base they discovered that all the buildings inside the base had been razed to the ground. There was unbearable stench of decayed and dismembered bodies and many of the troops felt physically sick. There was a fear that the LTTE had mined and booby trapped the base. The troops also faced resistance from LTTE positions in the northern and western ends of the base.

=== Attack in Colombo ===
Soon after the attack, the Ministry of Defence increased security bringing the alert level to maximum in the capital Colombo and around the island due to the LTTE declaring the week as Black July to commemorate the Black July riots. On 24 July, the LTTE placed suitcase bombs in four carriages in a commuter train near Dehiwala killing 64 civilians and wounding 400 others.

=== Withdrawal ===
The government wanted to hold onto the base and rebuild it but this was opposed by senior military commanders who didn't want to divert resources to maintain and defend an isolated outpost which was vulnerable to another LTTE attack. They wanted to abandon the base to prevent further loss and so orders were given to abandon the rescue operation and withdraw the troops, which took place on 24 and 25 July 1996. The withdrawal also faced problems and in one instance a large group of soldiers were left stranded on the beach and were all killed by the LTTE.

Over the next few weeks two officers and 62 soldiers returned to safety. Some had hidden up coconut trees or shallow wells before escaping. Some had trekked through jungles to reach the safety of military bases at Kokkutuduwai, Weli Oya and Elephant Pass. One soldier had managed to swim, under LTTE fire, to a naval patrol boat only for his identity to be scrutinised heavily before being allowed on board.

== Censorship and losses ==
News of the battle was widely reported around the world but the Sri Lankan public were kept largely in the dark as a result of censorship. President Chandrika Kumaratunga had issued the Emergency (Prohibition on Publication and Transmission of Sensitive Military Information) Regulations No 1 of 1996 proclamation under the Public Security Ordinance on 19 April 1996 imposing a news blackout about military operations. At the time of the attack Kumaratunga was out of the country. A Ministry of Defense communique on 20 July 1996, stated that a rescue mission was underway, with confirmation of 142 soldiers killed in action defending the base and another 37 reinforcing troops killed, including Lt. Col. Fazli Laphir. The communique had confirmed that there were over 168 soldiers wounded in the camp and the defenders had been separated in to two groups. The ICRC had informed the army that it were to hand over 101 bodies, yet had transport problems and expect to receive several hundred. The government claimed that 380 LTTE carders had been killed, of which 181 were killed during the initial assault including Mullaitivu military leader Kumaran, Women's Wing leader Meena Akka, Nalayan Master, a Sea Tiger leader, Madhuvanan, Trincomalee group leader and Milton, a Mullaitivu group leader.

The LTTE however continued to publicise the battle through its international secretariat in London. On 22 July 1996 they issued statement claiming that they had killed 1,208 soldiers and officers and that 241 of their own cadres had also been killed.

Censorship was lifted on 8 October 1996 when Deputy Defence Minister Anuruddha Ratwatte, the President's first cousin once removed, informed Parliament that the strength of the base was 1,407 but that only 12 had been killed in action. Ratwatte claimed that the 415 and 43 bodies handed over by the Red Cross to government officials in Kilinochchi and Vavuniya were not "identifiable as our soldiers". According to Ratwatte 71 troops had been killed during Thrivida Pahara, the rescue operation.

Around 1,500 Sri Lankan service personal and policemen were killed. The army lost 44 officers and 1125 other ranks whilst the navy lost a small contingent. Official records of the Ministry of Defence indicate 1,173 were killed, 80 civilians and 50 police officers stationed at the base were also killed. Pro-LTTE media claimed that the LTTE lost around 332 cadres in total.

The Sri Lanka Army saw the complete loss of its 25 Brigade with its two regular infantry battalions, support units and equipment. The 6th battalion, Vijayabahu Infantry Regiment lost 19 officers and 459 other ranks including its commanding officer Major T.R.A. Aliba, who was listed missing in action and posthumously promoted to the rank of lieutenant colonel. The battalion had to be reestablished at Weli Oya on 10 August 1996 under Captain C.T.S. Molligoda with 20 survivors and 129 who had been away at the time of the battle on leave or other duties. The 9th battalion, Sinha Regiment lost 21 officers and 524 other ranks including its second in command, Major W.C.H. Dabarera, who was listed missing in action and posthumously promoted to the rank of lieutenant colonel. It was reestablished on 20 August 1996 in Kegalle with survivors and personal who were not present during the battle.

=== Execution of prisoners ===
Iqbal Athas in his Sunday Times 'Situation report' on 13 October 1996 stated that per a Ministry of Defence source the LTTE had executed 207 prisoners of war after one of the POWs hurled a grenade, killing at least six LTTE cadres. Asia Week reported that some of the soldiers who survived had told the board of inquiry that they had watched LTTE cadres walking through the camp following the battle and summarily execute wounded captives. The US State Department stated that the LTTE killed over 1,500 government troops, including those who tried to surrender.

In 2019, 23 years of the battle, relatives of the missing service personal claimed that 600 to 700 soldiers had surrendered and had never been heard of again, including Major Janaka Kasthuriarachchi, the Brigade Major of 25 Brigade. In one case, an officer who managed to swim to a navy vessel claimed that he witnessed the execution of soldiers who surrender at the beach by the LTTE.

=== Captured weapons by LTTE ===
The LTTE removed the contents base armoury as well as weapons of the dead. In Parliament opposition member of parliament Dr. Jayalath Jayawardena tabled a list of weapons lost as two 122 mm howitzers with a range of 14 kilometres (8.7 miles), two 120 mm mortars, fifteen 81 mm mortars, thirty-two 60 mm mortars, eleven two-inch mortars, three RPG 7 rocket launchers, four 12.7 heavy machine guns, fifteen multi-purpose machine guns, 108 general-purpose machine guns, 1654 Type 56 assault rifles, 238 Type 81 assault rifles, four FNC sniper weapons, five Pakistani-manufactured A 3 rifles, twenty-three 40 mm grenade launchers and two flame throwers. Besides the weaponry, the LTTE also captured communication equipment, naval boats and armoured vehicles such as 2 Buffels and One Unicorn APC. The value of the military equipment removed by the LTTE was put in excess of US$20 million, with Dr Jayawardena telling parliament that the equipment lost was worth over Rs 2.73 billion. The haul was considered too much for the LTTE's small number of cadres to handle as it was enough to equip an infantry brigade.

== Aftermath ==
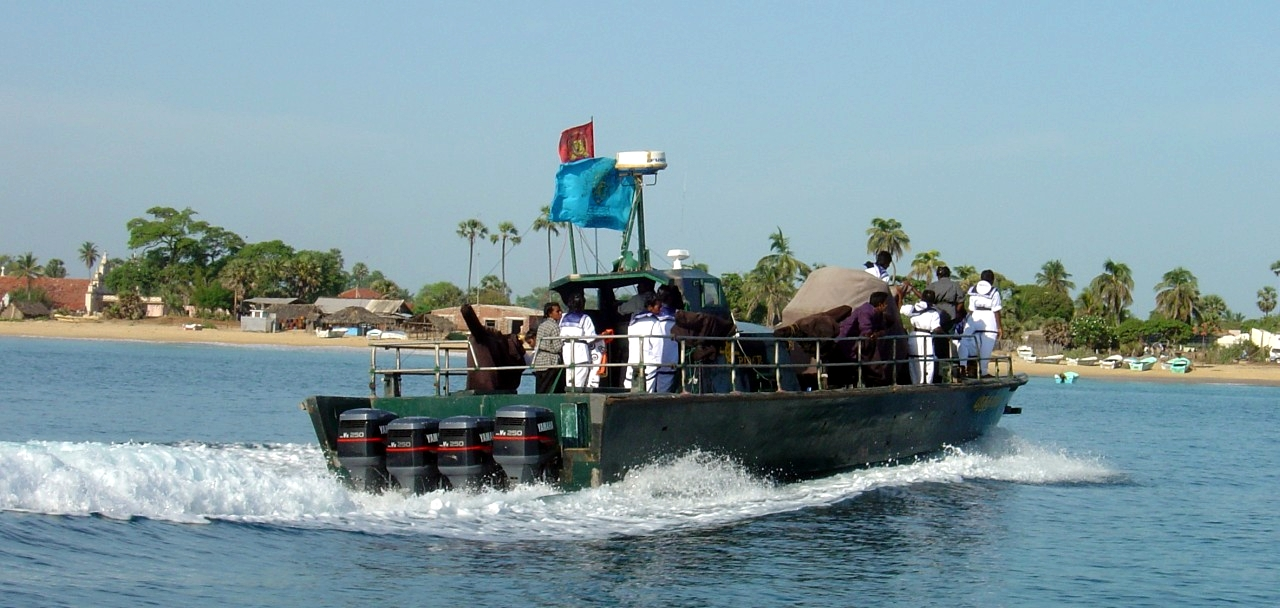
A LTTE Sea Tiger fast attack boat off Mullaitivu in May 2004.

Lack of preparation for a massive attack with multiple rings of trenchers and communication trenchers, aggressive reconnaissance patrolling along the defense perimeter and beyond by the Mullaitivu garrison due to man power shortages faced by the Sri Lanka Army in general at this time and its lack of training in night fighting have been attributed to the loss of the Mullaitivu base.

The Battle of Mullaitivu was a significant milestone in the civil war, it was the worst military defeat suffered by the Sri Lankan military to that point in its history, in terms of loss of life, equipment and land since it effectively handed over control of the Mullaitivu District by its decision not to reestablish its base in the Mullaitivu town. For the LTTE the battle was a great victory as it gained control over Mullaitivu which became an important military and naval base on the east coast, until the last days of the civil war, when it was re-captured by Sri Lankan military in January 2009. The battle allowed it to demonstrate that its military capability following its withdrawal from the Jaffna peninsula the year before and claimed by the Sri Lankan government that its military capability had been reduced after its defeats that year.

On 26 July the army launched Operation Sath Jaya from its base in Elephant Pass and after heavy fighting captured Kilinochchi in late September 1996. Operation Unceasing Waves-1 proved to be the first of several strategic military operations the LTTE would launch in the years that followed against the Sri Lankan military that found itself overstretched, short of manpower and low in morale, having captured the Jaffna peninsula in 1995 and having to devote a large amount of men and resources to defend and supply. It launched Operation Jayasikurui in 1997 to open a land route that failed to achieve its objective when it was called off in 1999. The LTTE launched Operation Unceasing Waves II recapturing the town of Kilinochchi in late September 1998 and making it its administrative centre for the next ten years. It then launched Operation Unceasing Waves III in which it captured the strategic Elephant Pass routing the infantry division that defended it and was on the verge of recapturing the Jaffna peninsula entrapping over 35,000 of the Sri Lankan military, until a stalemate was reached along the Muhamalai and Nagarkovil lines.

=== Inquiry ===
Colonel A. F. Lafir was awarded the Parama Weera Vibhushanaya, posthumously.

Daluwatte appointed a three-member court of inquiry (Major General Patrick Fernando, chair; Major General E. H. Samaratunga; and Brigadier Gamini Hettiarachchi) to inquire into how and why the defences at Mullaitivu failed and to estimate the loss of equipment. The court sat in Colombo and Anuradhapura and heard evidence from those involved including most of those who managed to escape from the base. The inquiry's findings were kept secret. A naval court of inquiry headed by Rear Admiral H. C. A. C. Thisera also took place.

Lafir was posthumously awarded the Parama Weera Vibhushanaya, the highest decoration awarded by the Sri Lankan military.

In 1998 military intelligence revealed that Captain Suresh Raj, officer commanding the artillery detachment based at Mullaitivu, had assisted the LTTE overrun the base and thereafter training LTTE carders to fire artillery.

=== Recapture ===
The army recaptured the town of Mullaitivu in January 2009 following the Battle of Mullaitivu (2009).

=== Memorial ===
The army unveiled a war memorial on 18 July 2010 for 1,163 troops killed during what it called the "Mullaitivu debacle". The monument is located inside the Security Forces Headquarters – Mullaitivu complex.

== See also ==
- Battle of Kokavil
- Battle of Pooneryn
