= 2008–2009 Sri Lankan Army Northern offensive =

Final offensive of the Sri Lankan civil war

2008–2009 SLA Northern offensive
- Part of the Sri Lankan Civil War, Eelam War IV, Northern Theatre of Eelam War IV
Date	January 2008 – 18 May 2009
Location	Northern Province
Result	SLA victory
Territorial changes	The LTTE loses all of its territory, which is retaken by government forces

Belligerents
Sri Lanka	Liberation Tigers of Tamil Eelam

Commanders and leaders
Gen. Sarath Fonseka: Major General Jagath Jayasuriya; Major General G. A. Chandrasiri; Major General Shavendra Silva; Major General Jagath Dias; Major General Nandana Udawatta	Velupillai Prabhakaran †

Units involved
Sri Lanka Armed Forces: Sri Lanka Army; 53 Division; 55 Division; 56 Division; 57 Division; 58 Division; 59 Division; 61 Division; Task Force 8; Commando Regiment; Deep Penetration Unit; Artillery Regiment; Sri Lanka Navy; Sri Lanka Air Force	Liberation Tigers of Tamil Eelam; Charles Anthony Brigade; Jeyanthan Brigade; Jeyanthan Brigade; Imran Pandian brigades; Kutti Sri Mortar Brigade; Black Tigers; Sea Tigers; Air Tigers

Strength
200,000	7,000–17,000

Casualties and losses
3,500+ killed, 16,000 wounded	2,200+ killed in 2008 (LTTE claim); 4,073 killed in 2008 (SLA claim); 2,515 killed in 2009 (SLA claim)
- 396 civilians killed January–September 2008; 20,000–40,000 civilians killed January 2009 – May 2009

The 2008–2009 SLA Northern offensive was an armed conflict in the northern Province of Sri Lanka between the military of Sri Lanka and the separatist Liberation Tigers of Tamil Eelam (LTTE). The battle began with a Sri Lanka Army (SLA) offensive attempting to break through the LTTE defence lines in the north of the island, aiming to conclude the country's 25-year-old civil war by military victory.

== Background ==
Following the defeat of the LTTE in the Eastern Province of Sri Lanka and their retreat to the north in July 2007, the Sri Lankan military set its sights on the separatist-held territory in the north. On 2 January 2008, the government of Sri Lanka unilaterally withdrew from the Ceasefire Agreement (CFA), originally signed on 22 February 2002, with the Tamil Tigers. According to Keheliya Rambukwella, a spokesman for the government on defence issues, the "Government of Sri Lanka decided to officially withdraw from the Ceasefire Agreement since it is futile to continue with the Ceasefire with no indication that LTTE is willing to enter the peace path." This set the stage for the Army's attack on the Forward Defence Lines (FDL) in the island's north.

== The battle ==
=== Probing the LTTE bunker lines ===
The SLA adopted new operational tactics for the battle opening several battle fronts across LTTE-controlled areas in Vanni. The target of the battle was the Elephant Pass. The Muhamalai, Nagarcoil and Kilali Forward Defence Lines, the three main FDLs in Jaffna district, were hit at the same time along with the FDLs in Vavuniya and Mannar districts. Over the next weeks, Army units were sent towards LTTE bunker lines in an attempt to the positions. By the end of February, although the SLA managed to destroy at least 250 LTTE bunkers, it was only able to advance a few kilometres into LTTE controlled territory. However, the SLA were still slowly advancing on the A-9 highway which directly leads toward Elephant Pass. The SLA issued several calls to the LTTE to surrender before the Army's advances.

On February 20, SLA forces staged its most intense attack on the LTTE bunker lines. In heavy fighting 92 rebels and three soldiers were killed according to the government. Another 20 soldiers were wounded and five bunkers were destroyed. More intense fighting also flared up on March 5. Major engagements all along the de facto border separating territory held by the LTTE occurred and on March 8, SLA troops, backed by helicopter gunships, pushed across the front lines using tanks, mortars and artillery. Eighty four rebels and 11 soldiers were killed during the close-quarters combat over those three days and nine rebel bunkers were destroyed and another four captured.

On March 22, a floating mine or a suicide attack off the northern coast of Sri Lanka killed 10 Sri Lankan seamen. None of their bodies were recovered.

By early April government soldiers were battling tropical illnesses brought on by heavy rains. About 500 troops affected by dengue fever and the mosquito-borne chikungunya virus were being treated at hospitals. Also, their offensive operations against LTTE frontlines stalled.

Mid-April offensive operations against the LTTE continued and dozens of LTTE bunker positions were overrun.

Two days after the failed offensive a bomb exploded on a crowded bus in the capital Colombo killing 24 passengers.

On May 16, a suicide bomber attacked a police bus in the Sri Lankan capital killing 10 people, including eight policemen. By this point an estimated 360 rebels and 41 soldiers had been killed in the month of May according to military sources.

On May 17, the military said it had captured Palampiddi town from the LTTE in Mannar district. A military spokesman said capturing Palampiddi was strategically important because it would block the rebels' supply route between the northern Vavuniya and Mannar districts.

During the rest of May and throughout June heavy fighting continued in which heavy SLA air strikes resulted in the destruction of an LTTE complex in the jungle.

Mannar District.

On July 16, Sri Lankan military claimed to have captured a major coastal town, Vidattaltivu, in the Mannar District of northwest Sri Lanka from the Tamil tigers. According to BBC correspondents, Vidattaltivu was an LTTE naval base and a hub for smuggling supplies from India across the Palk Strait. Vidattaltivu is the biggest town situated on Sri Lanka's North-Western coast (Jaffna lies on the north coast) and was a major base of the Sea Tigers. The Sri Lanka Army 58 Division and Commando Brigade took over the town in an attack; it was the first time that the Sri Lankan military was able to capture the town since the Indian Peacekeeping Force left Sri Lanka in 1990. The commandos of Sri Lanka's Army initially faced resistance from 60 LTTE cadres. But the LTTE soon started a withdrawal towards Iluppakkadavai as it came under heavy artillery and rocket fire. Later, the Sri Lankan military claimed over 30 LTTE cadres had been killed for the loss of just one soldier. Sri Lankan troops approaching from the east of Vidattaltivu cut off the Mannar-Poonaryn Road. Finally, the troops marched into the town and captured it after 21 years. Following the capture of the town, the Sri Lankan air force attacked withdrawing Tamil Tigers. According to the Air Force of Sri Lanka, Mi-24 helicopter gunships sank two LTTE boats 4 km north of Vidattaltivu around 1:00 PM local time.

=== Breaking the LTTE defence line ===
On September 2, SLA forces managed to break through LTTE defences and captured the town of Mallavi which was regarded as a "nerve centre" for the Tamil Tigers. Some 20 SLA soldiers and more than 100 Tigers were killed during the battle for the town.

The same day, the LTTE conducted a counter-attack against advancing SLA troops to regain their lost bunker lines. The Army claimed to have killed 52 and wounded 65 Tiger fighters. As for the SLA casualties suffered during the counter-attack the military said that they had seven soldiers killed, seven missing and 50 wounded while the LTTE claimed to have killed 75 soldiers and wounded 100.

After the taking of Mallavi the SLA started an advance on the rebels' de facto capital of Kilinochchi.

On September 9, LTTE suicide fighters, known as Black Tigers, conducted a raid on a military base in Vavuniya in coordination with two LTTE bomber planes and a Tiger artillery barrage, which totalled 70 shells. The raid left 25 people dead: 12 soldiers, 11 Tigers, one policeman and one civilian.

Since early September, heavy fighting had been raging for the town of Nachchikuda, both on land and sea. At least 29 soldiers were killed during that battle along with 100 to 200 Tigers in the month of September, according to the military. Dozens more died in October and the sea port, which was a vital base for the LTTE's Sea Tigers, finally fell on October 30.

By October 12, the SLA had come within 2 kilometres from the outskirts of Kilinochchi. The LTTE were preparing to defend the city with a string of concrete bunkers and trenches in a heavily mined jungle surrounding the town.

=== The west coast falls and Kilinochchi is surrounded ===
Between October 18 and October 20, heavy fighting raged on the outskirts of Kilinochchi, with SLA troops attempting to break through LTTE bunker lines. During these two days 36 SLA soldiers were killed and 48 were wounded in contrast to 12 Tamil Tiger fighters killed. This resulted in the deaths of some soldiers and the sickening of others. The military was not able to break through the remaining LTTE bunker lines situated before the city, due to heavy rain. Furthermore, most of the Sri Lankan army soldiers were needed to secure rebel territory taken in the previous two months after the LTTE's retreat to the north. With SLA forces stretched, that territory was coming under hit-and-run attacks by the rebels. Even the Sri Lankan Air Force was not able to dislodge the rebels from their positions on the roads into Kilinochchi. The city had, by this point, been evacuated of all civilians and the LTTE were preparing bunker positions within the town. Earlier in the month the SLA had stated they would take the rebel capital within days; however more than two weeks later operation maps at press briefings showed they were still 10 to 15 kilometres from the town, in contrast with their previous statements of being only two kilometres from Kilinochchi.

By mid-November SLA forces had managed to clear the entire west coast of LTTE cadres. By November 17, the SLA had captured three more strategic towns: Maankulam, Pandiyankulam and Pooneryn. Maankulam and Pooneryn had been in LTTE hands for the previous nine years. 54 soldiers were killed and another 350 wounded in the battle for Pooneryn, which fell after SLA forces advanced on the Pooneryn-Paranthan road. At the same time an offensive was conducted on the Muhamalai front. There, the SLA were attempting to break through the LTTE forward defence lines. Half a dozen attacks were repulsed by the LTTE leaving hundreds of casualties among government forces. In three days between November 16 and November 19, 200 SLA soldiers were reported to have been killed and another 700 wounded in battles across the north of the country. Some opposition lawmakers put the number at 250 killed. A Sri Lankan military source said the SLA Command in Jaffna had lost contact with two battalions. However, despite this, the SLA managed to break through the first line of the LTTE's defence on the Muhamalai fort front on November 20, which gave the SLA another 800 yards. This left the LTTE with two more lines of defence at Muhamalai.

=== Battle for Kilinochchi ===
In December, three unsuccessful SLA offensives were conducted in an attempt to take the capital of the Tigers, Kilinochchi. In early January, however, the town was taken by the SLA.

On December 10, an offensive was blunted with the deaths of 89 SLA soldiers according to a LTTE affiliated website, versus SLA reported deaths of 20 soldiers and 27 Tigers.

On December 16, a multi-front offensive was launched by the SLA against Kilinochchi. That offensive too was defeated by the Tigers. According to the Tigers the SLA lost two battalions of troops, 170 soldiers dead and 420 wounded. The SLA denied this and claimed to have had only 25 soldiers killed, 18 missing (LTTE pictures released after the battle confirmed at least 27 bodies of soldiers in their hands) and 160 wounded while they killed 120 Tigers. In any case, it was a critical victory for the Tigers at a time when they were being squeezed into the last pockets of territory they were holding. Such stiff resistance was not expected from the LTTE so late in the battle. This was mainly because the LTTE now deployed their best Special Forces members against the SLA's might, which had been held back earlier.

On December 20, an LTTE counter-offensive was mounted by the Tigers as SLA forces were preparing an attempt to attack and capture the village of Iranamadu, just south of the city. In the fighting that ensued the Tigers claimed to have killed 60 and wounded 150 SLA soldiers and pushed them back by two kilometres. The military again reported lower numbers of dead, 28 killed and missing.

On January 2, 2009, the Sri Lankan army troops entered the town of Kilinochchi from two sides. The intensity of fighting after the army entered the town remained unknown as both army and LTTE had banned independent reporters from the areas. The Sri Lankan Army met with only minimal resistance once it entered the town, as the Tigers had withdrawn and taken hiding positions in nearby jungles. It had been more than 10 years since the government had previously entered the town. Later, the military officially announced it had taken control of the town and were performing mopping-up operations.

=== Fall of Elephant Pass and Mullaittivu ===
On January 9, 2009, the LTTE's defence line in the Jaffna peninsula collapsed and SLA units from the north captured the strategic Elephant Pass base, which had been under LTTE control for almost nine years. LTTE fighters provided only minimal resistance to the advancing troops and instead retreated toward Mullaittivu in the northeast of the island, the last major town held by the LTTE, to where LTTE forces from Kilinochchi had already retreated.

On January 25, SLA troops crossed a lagoon and entered Mullaittivu before encountering heavy resistance from the LTTE. After several hours of fighting the military captured the last Tamil Tiger stronghold.

However, even with the fall of Mullaittivu, heavy fighting continued in the north-eastern jungles, with artillery bombardments killing another 160 civilians between January 25 and January 27. Human Rights Watch alleges that Sri Lankan Army artillery strikes against a hospital in Mullaitivu killed 67 people and wounded another 87; an article for The Guardian contends that the artillery strikes targeting a government-designated safe zone adjacent to the hospital killed 378 people and injured 1,212.

=== LTTE's last stand ===
By early February 2009, LTTE-controlled territory was reduced to 200 square kilometres. In a battle between February 2 and February 6, SLA forces captured the last Sea Tigers base at Chalai, north of Mullaittivu. 12 Sea Tigers were killed, including 4 top Sea Tiger commanders. By early March 2009, SLA forces surrounded the last LTTE-held town, Puthukkudiyiruppu. There they encountered heavy resistance from the final remnants of the LTTE, which stalled the SLA offensive yet again. Between March 5 and 8, heavy fighting raged as LTTE fighters conducted wave attacks against SLA lines in an attempt to break through. The SLA responded with heavy artillery shelling that left hundreds of civilian casualties. During those three days 250 rebels were killed according to SLA sources. Pro-LTTE website Tamilnet reported that at least 100 soldiers and 300 civilians were also killed.

On March 10, Black Tiger commandos reportedly attacked SLA artillery positions in Thearaavil, 18 km from Puthukkudiyiruppu junction. They, in a joint operation with LTTE's Col. Kiddu Artillery formation, destroyed six SLA artillery weapons platforms. The LTTE reported that they killed more than 50 soldiers while losing only three commandos.

Between March 14 and March 17, heavy battles raged and it seemed that the LTTE had finally managed to halt the advance of the SLA after a year of fighting, just when less than 28 square kilometres were left under the Tiger control. The fighting left 604 SLA soldiers dead according to the LTTE. Black Tiger commandos were also involved in the fighting. Despite this momentary victory the Tigers were still sustaining heavy casualties. By March 21, the LTTE's strength was down to only 1,500 fighters.

After the military advances were halted the SLA stopped using massive ground attacks on LTTE frontlines and concentrated on heavy artillery attacks on their positions. These attacks were leaving hundreds of civilian casualties and creating a humanitarian disaster. Between March 18 and March 26, SLA artillery and air strikes left more than 420 civilians killed and more than 660 wounded inside the government-declared safe zone.

On March 24, the LTTE attempted to break out through the SLA defences north of Iranapalai; however they were stopped by intense fire from SLA infantry and armoured units. The same day the military continued its advance, a week after the start of the heavy artillery and air attacks. Members of 53 Division and Task Force-8 seized control over a section of the LTTE-built earth bund ditch across the A-35 main road, west of the Nanthikadal lagoon.

Between April 1 and April 5, SLA forces killed 525 rebels and captured Puthukkudiriruppu. Now, the only uncleared territory for the SLA was the no-fire zone, where the remaining 500 LTTE fighters were mingled with the civilian refugees.

The LTTE managed to hold out against the military for another month, but by mid-May the end was near. By the first two weeks of May tens of thousands of refugees poured out of rebel-held territory after the military made holes in the LTTE's defences. In these final stages of the war, between May 7 and May 14, around 1,000 civilians were killed in the fighting. By May 15, all civilians had been evacuated from the no-fire zone and the military stated the war would be over in 48 hours. In those last 48 hours of fighting the LTTE conducted massive suicide bomb attacks on advancing troops and were in general not surrendering but dying in battle. Early on May 16, the SLA forces coming in from the north linked up with the forces coming in from the south on the coastline, effectively cutting off the Tigers from the sea. Now they were boxed in and surrounded by the SLA on a territory only 1.92 square kilometres in size, with their back against the Nanthikadal lagoon.

==== Defeat of the LTTE ====
President Mahinda Rajapaksa declared military victory over the tigers on May 16, 2009 after 26 years of conflict. On the same day for the first time in their long struggle against the Sri Lankan government, the rebels were offering to lay down their weapons in return for a guarantee of safety. Sri Lanka's disaster relief and human-rights minister Mahinda Samarasinghe stated 'The military phase is over. The LTTE has been militarily defeated. Now the biggest hostage rescue operation in the world has come to a conclusion; the figure I have here is since 20 April, 179,000 hostages have been rescued.'

On May 17, rebel official Selvarasa Pathmanathan conceded defeat saying in an email statement "This battle has reached its bitter end". Earlier in the day, a group of about 70 Tamil Tigers tried to cross the lagoon to the other side in six boats and escape, but they were all killed by the SLA. Also, SLA special forces rescued seven POW's (three soldiers and four sailors). The four sailors had been in captivity since November 2006.

Late in the evening, SLA special forces conducted a raid in which they killed Charles Anthony, the eldest son of the LTTE leader Velupillai Prabhakaran, Balasingham Nadesan, the leader of the political wing of the LTTE, Seevaratnam Puleedevan, head of the LTTE's peace secretariat, and Ramesh, a top military leader.

==== Death of LTTE leadership ====
On May 18, the Sri Lanka Army forces confirmed that Prabhakaran was killed in the morning of that day. According to the UK Telegraph, Prabhakaran was "...killed in a rocket-propelled grenade attack as he tried to escape the war zone with his closest aides. Soosai, the leader of his "Sea Tigers" navy, and Pottu Amman, his intelligence chief were also killed in the attack." The LTTE confirmed Prabhakaran's death on May 24.

== Foreign Tamils ceasefire call ==
Tamil people in India, as well as the worldwide Tamil diaspora, had repeatedly called for a cease-fire: rallies had taken place in many major western cities such as Toronto, London, Washington, Montreal, Paris, and Berlin.

== Casualties ==
The UN estimated in May 2009, that 7,000 civilians had been killed and another 16,700 had been wounded between January 20 and May 7, 2009, and another 1,000 were killed in heavy artillery bombardments by the SLA forces in the last week of fighting. Both the Sri Lankan Army and the LTTE were blamed for the civilian deaths. Another 396 civilians were killed between January and September 2008.

The Times newspaper reported that as many as 20,000 civilians had been killed in the Safe Zone. Some of the deaths were caused by the Tamil Tigers but most were as a result of shelling by the Sri Lankan military. The UN had previously estimated that 6,500 civilians had been killed in the three months to the middle of April, meaning that the death toll soared to 1,000 each day in the final two weeks of the war. The UN says it has no confirmed estimates of civilian casualties and the Sri Lankan government has denied the Times' allegations. The Guardian newspaper, quoting another U.N. official, called the Times' figure as a "dangerous extrapolation". The Guardian also questioned the many underlying assumptions of the Times's figure.

The SLA stated that, by January 6, 2009, they had killed up to 4,073 LTTE militants in the previous fourteen months, most of them in the north. In contrast the LTTE said they had lost 2,200 fighters during 2008. Another 2,515 LTTE militants were reported to have been killed between January and May 2009. The SLA also reported at the end of October they suffered 1,270 soldiers killed in the whole country, only around a dozen were not killed in the north.

Following the implementation of the new government policy in October to not reveal military casualties the only sources on the numbers of SLA dead were the ones from pro–LTTE sources. There were also several sporadic reports by the SLA to counteract the reports by the Tigers in the propaganda war. According to reports of the pro–LTTE website Tamilnet and those several military reports, a conservative estimate had been made that hundreds of SLA soldiers had been killed since then. However, in mid-January 2009, the military confirmed that 3,700 soldiers had been killed in the previous three years of fighting and another 16,000 were wounded in the recent offensive. With 1,325 confirmed dead in 2006 and 2007, that would make a total of 2,375 killed in 2008, with less than a hundred not killed in the north. Also, more than 1,200 soldiers were estimated to have died in 2009.

=== Casualty numbers manipulation ===
Casualty figures provided by both sides differ wildly and cannot be independently verified. On numerous occasions it was established that the government was covering up its own casualty figures, as on March 5, when Health Minister Nimal Siripala de Silva stated to the Parliament that 104 soldiers and policemen had been killed in February, while the Defence Ministry reported only 63 government soldiers killed during that month and 107 soldiers since the start of the year.

Initially the SLA stated that 185 soldiers had been killed or gone missing during the failed offensive in the Jaffna peninsula in April, but later some military sources cited a lesser number of 49 soldiers killed. In June, parliamentary oversight prompted the release of official figures. The figures showed that 120 soldiers had been killed and 945 wounded during April, which was in contrast with military statements citing 90 killed. Also the release showed that 138 soldiers had been killed and 540 wounded in May, while the military claimed 92 killed.

Sri Lankan Prime Minister Ratnasiri Wickramanayake confirmed that during the month of September, 200 soldiers had been killed and another 997 wounded. This was in contrast to the claims of the Defence Ministry that only 96 soldiers had been killed during that month.

Finally, after months of attempts by the military to conceal the true casualty figures, on the request of Parliament, on October 20, it was revealed that 1,099 soldiers had been killed along with 396 civilians in the first nine months of the year. Some 7,000 soldiers had also been wounded. Following this revelation the government implemented a new policy of not revealing any more day-to-day numbers of soldiers killed in the conflict.

Also, it had come into question how much the government was inflating the LTTE's losses, because at the start of the year the government stated there were only 3,000 militants left, but by mid-June they reported to have killed over 5,000 militants and wounded 3,000, which would mean that the whole of the LTTE had already been destroyed.

A three-member United Nations panel which collected evidence for over 10 months said that "the panel's determination of credible allegations reveals a very different version of the final stages of the war than that maintained to this day by the government." The panel also called on the Secretary General of UN to immediately set up "an independent international mechanism" for investigating "credible" allegations that both Sri Lankan government and Tamil Tigers committed serious human rights violations and war crimes and crimes against humanity, in the months before the decades-old civil war ended in 2009. The panel said that 40,000 people had been killed in the war, of whom tens of thousands died in the war's last five months. According to the panel, most civilian casualties in the final phases of the war were caused by government shelling that could amount to "war crimes."

The panel furthermore stated that "the government systematically shelled hospitals on all fronts," and "deprived people in conflict zone of humanitarian aid in the form of food and medical supplies, particularly surgical supplies." The panel documented LTTE use of civilians as human shields.

U.N. Secretary General Ban Ki-moon stated that the U.N. would not launch an investigation without the agreement of the Sri Lankan government and U.N. member states. Human Rights Watch stated that such an investigation was being blocked by the Russian and Chinese governments, while the American ambassador to the UN requested that the Sri Lankan government address the panel's report constructively, in order to further the peace process.

== See also ==
- List of Sri Lankan Civil War battles
- War crimes during the final stages of the Sri Lankan Civil War
