= Priyanka Fernando =

Sri Lanka Army general

Major General Priyanka Fernando RWP, USP
- ප්‍රියංක ප්‍රනාන්දු
- Born: 9 December 1966 (age 59); Colombo, Sri Lanka
- Education: D. S. Senanayake College
- Military career
- Allegiance: Sri Lanka
- Branch: Sri Lanka Army
- Service years: 1986–2021
- Rank: Major General
- Unit: Gemunu Watch
- Commands: 58 Division, 651 Brigade, 511 Brigade, 221 Brigade, 11th Battalion, Gemunu Watch
- Conflicts: Sri Lankan Civil War Eelam War V
- Awards: Rana Wickrama Padakkama Uttama Seva Padakkama Desha Putra Sammanaya

Major General Priyanka Fernando, RWP, USP, is a former senior Sri Lanka Army officer. He has served as the Director General of General Staff (DGGS); General officer commanding (GOC), 58 Division; Commandant of the Ranaviru (veterans) Resource Centre; Director of Rehabilitation; and the Director of Real Estate and Quartering. He served as the Colonel of the Regiment of the Mechanized Infantry Regiment and was the Sri Lankan Minister Counsellor (Defence) in London.

== Early life and education ==
Fernando was educated at D. S. Senanayake College.

== Military career ==
=== Early career ===
Fernando enlisted the Sri Lanka Army regular force as a cadet officer on 27 October 1986, receiving his basic training at the Sri Lanka Military Academy, and was commissioned as a second lieutenant in the Gemunu Watch on 23 July 1987. He served with the 5th Battalion, Gemunu Watch which was part of the elite Air Mobile Brigade. He was a course instructor of the Sri Lanka Military Academy.

=== Field command ===
Fernando was promoted to the rank of lieutenant colonel and served as the commanding officer of the 11th Battalion, Gemunu Watch, from October 2007 until December 2008. He was attached to the 59 Division and which was commanded by Major General Nandana Udawatta during the Sri Lankan Civil War. Thereafter, he was promoted to colonel and served as officiating Brigade Commander of the 651 Brigade from August 2009 to February 2010, and from October 2014 to January 2016. After being a young Brigade Commander, he was appointed as the Centre Commandant of the Gemunu Watch.

=== Staff duties ===
Fernando was appointed as a brigade commander on two other occasions, first in the 511 Brigade and then in the 221 Brigade. Brigadier Fernando was appointed as Minister Counsellor (Defence) to the High Commission of Sri Lanka, London, on 5 August 2017 and served until 28 February 2018. Following his return, Fernando took a Brigade Commander course in China. He then served as the commandant, Ranaviru Sevana (Veteran services), from September 2018 to January 2019, and commandant of Ranaviru Resources Centre from January 2019 to December 2019. He served as director real estate and quartering at the Army Headquarters from 24 January 2019 to 18 December 2019.

=== Higher command ===
In March 2020, Fernando was appointed general officer commanding of the 58 Division. On 18 May 2020, Fernando was promoted to the rank of major general. After serving as GOC, 58 Division, he was appointed as the Director General General Staff (DGGS) at the army headquarters in January 2021. He was the Parade Commander in the 73rd Independence Day (2021) of Sri Lanka. On the 21 July 2021, Fernando served as the 12th Colonel of the Regiment of the Mechanized Infantry Regiment (MIR). He retired from the army in December 2021.

== Awards and decorations ==
Fernando's decorations are the Rana Wickrama Padakkama and bar, the Uttama Seva Padakkama, the Northern Humanitarian Operations Medal, the Eastern Humanitarian operations Medal, the North and East Operations Medal, the Riviresa Campaign Services Medal, the Sevabhimani Padakkama, the Sewa padakkama, the Sri Lanka Army 50th Anniversary Medal, the Purna Bhumi padakkama, the 50th Independence Anniversary Commemoration Medal, and the Sri Lanka Armed Services Long Service Medal.

== Controversy ==
During his tenure as the Minister Counsellor (Defence) of the High Commission of Sri Lanka in London, Fernando gained media attention for making throat-slitting gestures towards LTTE protesters outside the Sri Lankan High Commission in London on 4 February 2018 (Sri Lanka's independence Day), for which he was fined £2,400 by the Westminster Magistrates' Court, which ruled Fernando "is not protected by diplomatic immunity".

In March 2020, the Westminster Magistrates’ Court ruling was overturned on appeal by Fernando to the High Court of Justice, which quashed his conviction, upholding his diplomatic immunity as per the Vienna Convention, to which Sri Lanka and the United Kingdom are parties. The High Court judges ruled the Chief Magistrate of Westminster Magistrates’ Court was incorrect in her decision that Fernando was not covered by residual immunity at the time.

== See also ==
- Diplomatic immunity
- Doron Almog
- Andrey Matveyev
- Devyani Khobragade
- Stephen Saunders
