= Battle of Mullaitivu =

Battle of Mullaitivu may refer to:

- Battle of Mullaitivu (1996), occurred between July 18 and July 25, 1996.
- Battle of Mullaitivu (2009), occurred in January 2009 as part of the 2008 – 2009 SLA Northern offensive.
