= Udawatta (surname) =

Udawatta is a surname. Notable people with the surname include:

- Nandana Udawatta, Sri Lankan general
- Pradeep Udawatta (born 1971), Sri Lankan cricketer
