= Nandana Udawatta =

Major General Nandana Udawatta RSP, USP
- Military career
- Allegiance: Sri Lanka
- Branch: Sri Lanka Army
- Service years: 1981–2017
- Rank: Major General
- Unit: Sri Lanka Armoured Corps
- Commands: Security Forces Headquarters – Jaffna, Commander Security Forces Headquarters - Mullaittivu, 59 Division
- Conflicts: Sri Lankan Civil War, Insurrection 1987-89
- Awards: Rana Sura Padakkama, Uttama Seva Padakkama

Major General Nandana Udawatta, RSP, USP, psc, SLAC was a Sri Lankan general. He has served as the Master General Ordnance, Commander Security Forces Headquarters - Jaffna, Commander Security Forces Headquarters - Mullaittivu and was the general officer commanding, 59 Division during the SLA offensives in the Wanni region during 2008 – 2009 period that led to a major victory for the SLA over the Liberation Tigers of Tamil Eelam (LTTE) in the Sri Lankan civil war.

Educated at Royal College, Colombo, Udawatta joined the army on August 31, 1981 after leaving school and was commissioned in to the Sri Lanka Armoured Corps in 1982 as a second lieutenant. He was promoted as lieutenant in 1984, captain in 1986, major in 1990, lieutenant colonel in 1997 and colonel in 2000. He went to become the commanding officer the 5th Reconnaissance Regiment, SLAC and Commander of Armoured Brigade four times playing a major role in operations such as Jayasikuru, Wanni Wickrama and Green Belt.

In 2006 he was promoted the rank of brigadier and served as deputy officiating GOC of the 57 Division. On November 13, 2007 he was appointed as officiating General Officer Commanding of the newly formed 59 Division. The 59 Division was tasked with single-handedly fighting its way to recapture the rebel stronghold of Mullaitivu from the welioya sector. The division captured much of the district of Mullaitivu, the major LTTE One Four base and finally the town of Mullaitivu during the Mullaitivu Battle in early 2009. On February 5, 2009 he was promoted to the rank of major general. Thereafter on May 10, 2009 he was appointed briefly as Overall Operations Commander, Anuradhapura prior to being posted as Commander Security Forces Headquarters - Mullaittivu in June 2009.

He served as the minister of the Sri Lankan Embassy in Moscow, Master General Ordnance and Commander Security Forces Headquarters - Jaffna. He was the Colonel Commandant of the Sri Lanka Armoured Corps. He retired from the army in December 2017.

== Awards and decorations ==
General Udawatta has received the Rana Sura Padakkama (RSP), Uttama Seva Padakkama (USP), the Sri Lanka Armed Services Long Service Medal, the Riviresa Campaign Services Medal, the Purna Bhumi Padakkama and the North and East Operations Medal.

| | Rana Sura Padakkama | Uttama Seva Padakkama | |
| Purna Bhumi Padakkama | North and East Operations Medal | Riviresa Campaign Services Medal | Sri Lanka Armed Services Long Service Medal |

Relationship with the media

Although he did not maintain close relationships with the media during his military career, in 2019 Major General Jagath Dias who was his superior officer during the humanitarian operation has credited him as one of the unsung heroes in the War against LTTE Terrorism during Talk with Chathura tv programme.

Military offices
| Preceded by Post created | Commander Security Forces Headquarters – Mullaitivu; 2009 - Incumbent | Succeeded by - |
