= Balasingham Nadesan =

Sri Lankan Tamil rebel

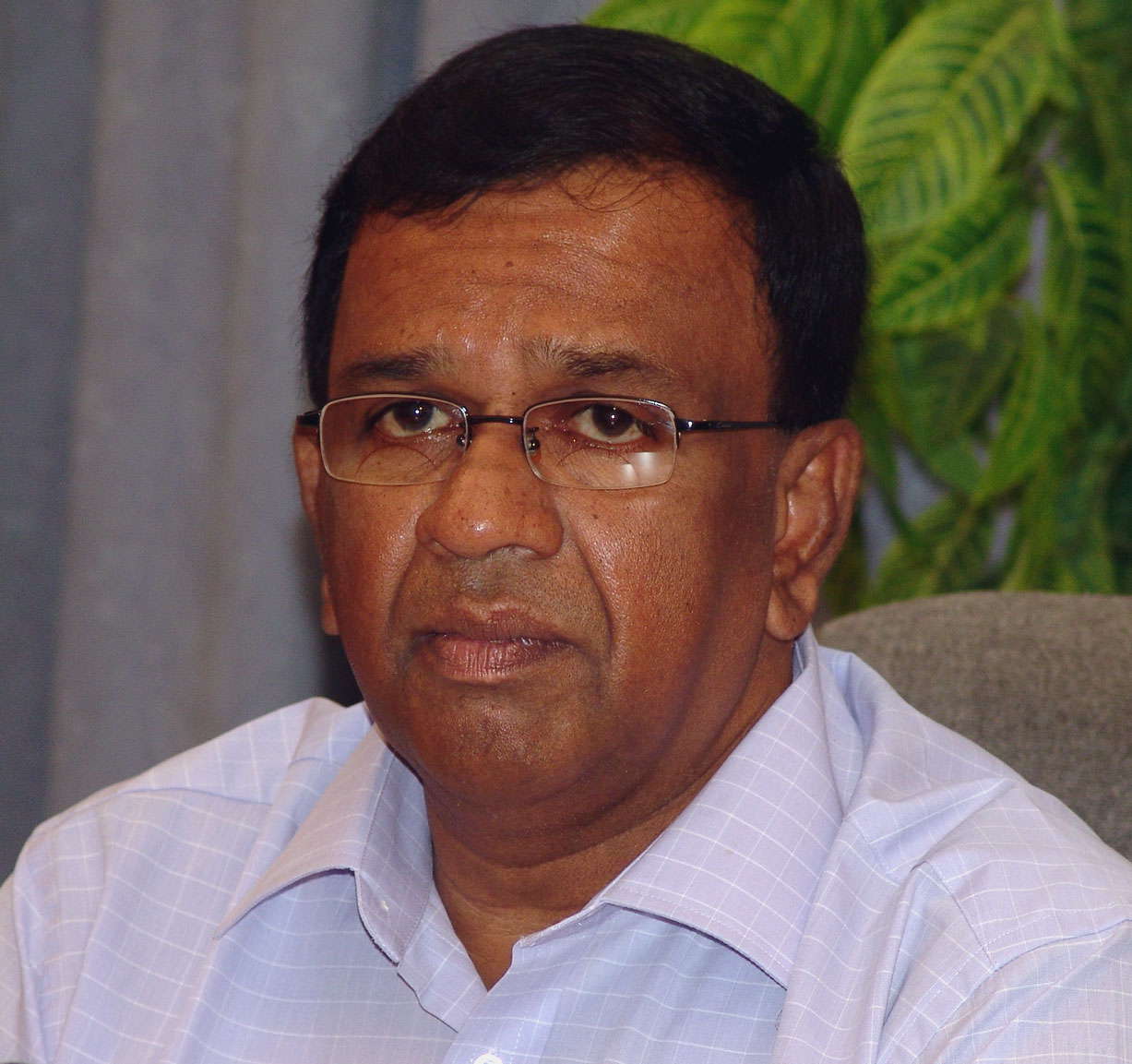
- Died: 18 May 2009; Mullaithivu, Sri Lanka
- Other names: B.Nadesan
- Occupation: Political Leader of the Liberation Tigers of Tamil Eelam
- Spouse: Vineetha Samarasinghe Gunasekara

Balasingham Nadesan (Tamil:பாலசிங்கம் நடேசன்) was the Political Chief of the Liberation Tigers of Tamil Eelam (LTTE) from late 2007 until his death in 2009. Formerly, he was the organization's Chief of Police.

== Personal life ==
Balasingham Nadesan was married to a Sinhalese woman, Vineetha Samarasinghe Gunasekara, when they worked in the police force for the Sri Lankan Government in Colombo. He left the Sri Lankan Police joining the LTTE after the Black July riots in 1983 in Colombo.

== Career ==
As Chief of Police, Nadesan oversaw the development of police stations in the East following the 2002 Ceasefire Agreement brokered by Norway. He also accompanied numerous delegations of the LTTE overseas. In November 2007, he became head of the political division after S. P. Thamilselvan was killed in an air strike by the Sri Lankan Air Force.

== Death ==
Nadesan was killed on 18 May 2009 when the Sri Lankan Army overcame the final stronghold of the Tamil Tigers. Nadesan and his family were executed by the Sri Lankan Army after an agreement to surrender during the White Flag incident that came to recognition on international terms.

== See also ==
- Liberation Tigers of Tamil Eelam
