= Battle of Mullaitivu (2009) =

Battle of the Sri Lankan civil war

- Part of the Sri Lankan Civil War, 2008–2009 SLA Northern offensive
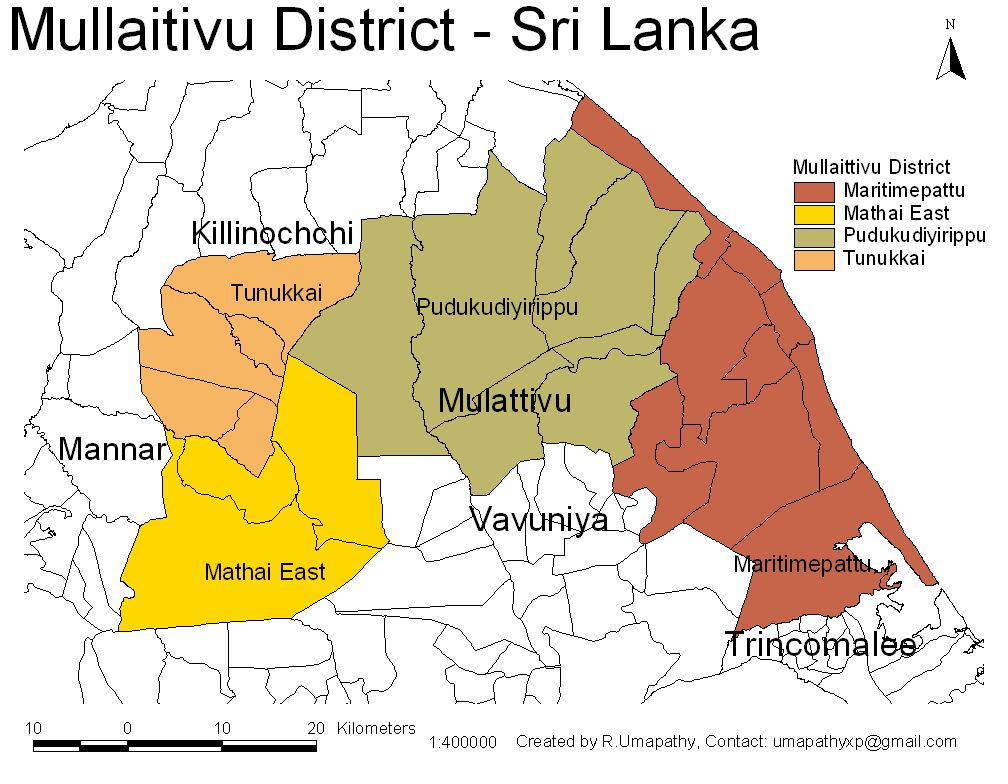
- Detailed map of Mullaitivu District
Date	2–25 January 2009
Location	Mullaitivu, northern Sri Lanka 9.266667°N 80.81667°E
Result	Sri Lankan Army victory
Territorial changes	Mullaitivu regained by the Government of Sri Lanka

Belligerents
Sri Lanka	Liberation Tigers of Tamil Eelam

Commanders and leaders
(Sri Lanka) Mahinda Rajapaksha: (Sri Lanka) Gotabaya Rajapaksa: Sarath Fonseka: Nandana Udawatta; Laksiri Waduge	Velupillai Prabhakaran

Units involved
Sri Lanka Armed Forces: Sri Lanka Army; 59 Division; 593 Brigade; 7 Gemunu Watch; Sri Lanka Air Force	Liberation Tigers of Tamil Eelam

Strength
>7,000	Unknown

Casualties and losses
Unknown	Unknown
- Location of Mullaitivu

The Battle of Mullaitivu (Sinhala: මුලතිව් සටන) was a land battle fought between the Sri Lankan Military and the Liberation Tigers of Tamil Eelam (LTTE) for the control of the town of Mullaitivu in the Northern Theatre of Eelam War IV during the Sri Lankan civil war. The town of Mullaitivu was the last stronghold of the LTTE. The government declared on 25 January 2009 that its troops had entered the town and were consolidating their positions.

The Sri Lanka Air Force had been attacking LTTE positions in and around Mullaitivu for several days before the government troops claimed to have entered it. After the Battle of Kilinochchi (23 November 2008 – 2 January 2009), during which the Sri Lankan military captured the LTTE stronghold of Kilinochchi, the Ministry of Defence had stated that the military's next target was Mullaitivu. Leaflets had been dropped by the Sri Lanka Air Force earlier over the town, urging civilians to come to government controlled "safe zones". The government also suspended all civil administration work on 23 January to allow public servants to leave the area. The army had allowed a 32 kilometres (20 mi) "safe area" inside the war zone for civilians to exit. Independent aid agencies report about 230,000 civilians were inside the war zone around the northern city.

== Background ==
The LTTE captured the Mullaitivu military base and town in 1996, following a battle which resulted in at least 1639 soldiers being killed or missing. The LTTE used the town as their main military base since then. A large base of the Sea Tigers was also located in Mullaitivu.

Mullaitivu had been a main target of the Sri Lankan military offensive in the Northern Theatre of Eelam War IV.

== Battle ==
Before the battle, public offices in Mullaittivu were closed for the weekend and government employees had moved out of the city ahead of the impending military action on 25 January. Civilians from Mullaittivu were also seen moving towards the north into the jungle areas where the LTTE guerrillas had retreated. On 24 January 2009, the LTTE had blown up a dam near the town which flooded the surrounding areas. LTTE fighters also built earth barriers, which made it difficult for the army to approach with heavy tanks.

Infantrymen of the Sri Lankan army's 7th Gemunu Watch first entered the town after facing fierce resistance from the LTTE. The ground forces were backed by helicopter gunships of the Sri Lankan Air Force. Sri Lankan troops also moved in with a small group of boats from the western side of Mullaittivu. Later, the 59th Division was involved in the consolidating the captured town. Some LTTE fighters were later reported to be hiding in a small area between Vishwamadhu and Puthukkudiyiruppu.

== Aftermath ==
With the fall of Mullaitivu, the LTTE lost approximately 95 percent of the land they had once controlled. Sarath Fonseka, the commander of the Sri Lanka Army, then requested the public to celebrate the victory with dignity by hoisting the national flag. Before the town was captured, the Sri Lankan army seized two nearby facilities used for making bombs and landmines that reportedly contained 4,000 detonators and 150 kg of explosives. The Sri Lankan army continued to target LTTE positions after the capture of Mullaitivu, and attacked remaining LTTE positions inside jungles.

LTTE chief Velupillai Prabhakaran was said to be hiding in the last jungle areas held. However, the Sri Lankan government was never certain of the exact location. His body was found floating in a mangrove swamp after all resistance had ended. India and Malaysia had also taken steps to prevent Prabhakaran from entering their territories. Prabhakaran was wanted in India for the assassination of Prime Minister Rajiv Gandhi.

== International reactions ==
- Pranab Mukherjee, Minister of External Affairs, visited Colombo to put forth India's demand to extradite Prabhakaran if he is caught alive. India was to "seek the safety of Tamil population in Sri Lanka." However, Mukherjee stated that India has no sympathies with the LTTE which is a banned organisation in India.
- Jonas Gahr Støre, Foreign Affairs Minister of the Government of Norway said Norway condemned the "conduct of current hostilities causing unacceptable suffering of civilians" in the offensive, with International Development Minister Erik Solheim urging the parties to ensure that food and other humanitarian assistance reach the population – "The sick and wounded must be given access to treatment, and ambulances need to freely enter and leave the conflict area." A health official reported that at least 300 civilians were wounded and scores killed by Sri Lankan army artillery shells fired into a designated "safe zone" for Tamils trapped by fighting between the military and Tamil rebels. The Sri Lankan military denied firing into the zone, saying no hospitals or schools were hit.
- The United Nations demanded safety of Tamil civilians in the Vanni. UN Secretary General Ban Ki-moon has expressed his "deep concern" over civilians trapped in the war zone.
- The International Committee of the Red Cross (ICRC) witnessed a major humanitarian crisis was unfolding, with hundreds killed, and hospitals and schools being hit. Reacting to body counts in the hundreds at local hospitals, The ICRC wanted to evacuate 200 wounded people for treatment, but could not obtain security clearance – they now faced certain death.
- Germany stated civilians had been cut off from international aid for more than 10 days and condemned the hostilities, calling for a negotiated ceasefire and a political agreement between the Sri Lankan Government and the Tamil rebels.
- (United States) US ambassador to Sri Lanka Robert Blake urged the Sri Lankan Army and LTTE to "ensure civilians are not caught in crossfire".
