= White Flag incident =

Massacre in Sri Lanka

The White Flag incident refers to the massacre of surrendering leaders of the Liberation Tigers of Tamil Eelam and their families by the Sri Lankan Army on 18 May 2009 in Mullivaikal, Mullaitivu, Vanni, Sri Lanka. The LTTE's Political Wing leader, Balasingham Nadesan and Pulidevan agreed to surrender and contacted the United Nations, the governments of Norway, the United Kingdom, the United States and the International Committee of the Red Cross. They were given assurance by Mahinda Rajapaksa, the Prime Minister of Sri Lanka, and told to surrender at a particular place by Basil Rajapakse. LTTE's request for a third party witness to oversee the surrender was not granted by the Sri Lankan government. The LTTE surrendered to the 58 Division (Sri Lanka) carrying white flags, but were reportedly shot dead. Sarath Fonseka, then the Sri Lankan Army Chief stated that they had been shot dead on the orders of Gotabhaya Rajapaksa to Shavendra Silva, commander of the 58 Division (Sri Lanka). Balachandran Prabhakaran, Prabhakaran's 12-year-old son, was also killed after surrendering along with his bodyguards. A UN Panel stated the LTTE leaders intended to surrender. The Sri Lankan government has denied any accusations of wrongdoing.

== Background ==
In the waning days of the Sri Lankan Civil War, the remnants of the LTTE, running low on ammunition and manpower, found themselves trapped in an area of a little over 3 km in Mullivaikal with the Sri Lankan Army closing in on them. Tens of thousands of civilians were trapped by the Sri Lankan Army with the LTTE. On 14 May 2009 discussions began to negotiate a possible surrender. Negotiating on behalf of the LTTE was political head, Balasingham Nadesan, and peace secretariat, Seevaratnam Pulidevan.

The Tamil Tiger political leaders managed to negotiate a surrender on the last day of the war. Agreeing to, as Nadesan told American journalist Marie Colvin, "abide by the result of any referendum" and pleading for a ceasefire, the LTTE sent desperate messages through every channel they could think of – the United Nations, the Red Cross, European diplomats and intermediaries, Tamil parliament member Rohan Chandra Nehru, and The Sunday Times reporter, Colvin. It was all a desperate attempt to save the lives of an estimated 300 fighters and their families. The Sri Lankan President, Mahinda Rajapaksa was aware of the negotiated surrender. On 17 May 2009 Marie Colvin received a call from Nadesan asking that she relay to the United Nations that, "they [The LTTE] would lay down their arms, they wanted a guarantee of safety from the U.S. or Great Britain, and an assurance the Sri Lankan Government would agree to a political process that would guarantee the rights of the Tamil minority". According to Colvin, she established contact with Vijay Nambiar, Chief of Staff to Secretary-General Ban Ki-moon and relayed the LTTE's conditions for surrender, which he in turn agreed to relay to the government.

== Incident ==
By the night of 17 May, the LTTE had no more political demands but requested Nambiar to be present to guarantee their safety in surrender. Nambiar told Colvin that he had been assured by Sri Lankan President Mahinda Rajapaksa of the surrendering combatants' safety, all they had to do was "hoist a white flag high". Nambiar told her that the President's assurance was enough and that his presence was unnecessary. At 1:06 AM on 18 May 2009, Nadesan made his final call to Tamil MP Chandrakanth Chandranehru saying they were walking towards the Sri Lankan military and, "I will hoist the white flag as high as I can". According to witnesses, Nadesan's Sinhalese wife was among the front of the surrender party.

Hours later, the Sri Lankan Army announced that the Nadesan, Pulidevan, and the LTTE members accompanying them had been killed. That evening they displayed their bodies. The Sri Lankan Government has given various contradicting explanations of the deaths – from denying the surrender to claiming that those surrendering were shot by their supporters in the back. General Sarath Fonseka, the commander of the Sri Lankan Army at the time, claimed Defense Minister Gotabhaya Rajapaksa gave instructions to Shavendra Silva, commander of the 58 Division, to kill the surrendering LTTE. Many witnesses have come forward to say that the Sri Lankan Army killed the surrendering LTTE members. Pictures have surfaced of Balachandran Prabhakaran, the 12-year-old son of LTTE founder and leader, Velupillai Prabhakaran, alive, unharmed and in custody of the military. A photo from a few hours later shows the boy's dead body shot in the chest five times. Other photos have appeared of Isaipriya, the LTTE TV broadcaster, alive and in the custody of the Sri Lankan military. Footage obtained by Channel 4 News shows a number of dead bodies, including that of Isaipriya, which showed signs of possible sexual assault. These emerging eyewitness reports, photos, and videos are part of the mounting evidence of Sri Lankan soldiers summarily executing captured Tamils in the closing stages of the war.

The "White Flag Incident" was heavily featured in a UN report which not only upheld the credibility of war crimes allegations against the Sri Lankan government and led to the launch of a full investigation, but called into review the UN's actions at the end of the war as well.
