= Stanley Road bombing =

1996 suicide bombing in Sri Lanka

- Date: 4 July 1996
- Target: Nimal Siripala de Silva, Minister of Housing, Construction and Public Utilities
- Attack type: suicide bombing
- Weapon: Suicide vest
- Deaths: 23
- Injuries: 59
- Perpetrator: Liberation Tigers of Tamil Eelam

The Stanley Road bombing was a suicide bombing carried out by the Liberation Tigers of Tamil Eelam (LTTE) during the separatist civil war in Sri Lanka between the government and the Tamil Tigers.

Nimal Siripala de Silva, Minister of Housing, Construction and Public Utilities, who was the Chairman of the Presidential Task Force on Northern Rehabilitation arrived in Jaffna at 9 AM on 4 July 1996 on visit to supervise on-going reconstruction projects. Following a discussion related to the reconstruction of Jaffna and a book distribution ceremony at the Holy Family Convent, Jaffna; the Minister the proceed to attend the opening ceremony for the new Building Materials Corporation (BMC) outlet on Stanley Road.

After the opening ceremony the minister walked to the SLAMC Mitsubishi Pajero vehicle he was using during the visit to head to his next meeting with officers in charge of rehabilitation work at the Jaffna Kachcheri. The Pajero was driving by Brigadier Ananda Hamangoda, Brigade Commander, 512 "Jaffna" Brigade, while the minister sat on front passenger seat. Ranjit Godamuduna, chairman of Lanka Cement Ltd, and a body guard were to sit in the back.

Just as the minister got into the vehicle around 12:45pm, a seemingly pregnant woman dressed in a white blouse with two bags in her hand moved forward from the crown and approached the entourage. A Quick Reaction Team (QRT) motorbike driven by Lance Corporal W. I. M. Seneviratne with Private Pushpakumara was 20m away. Suspecting a suicide bomber, Seneviratne immediately maneuvered his bike to block her path. With nowhere to go, the woman detonated the explosives strapped onto her body, killing herself and Seneviratne instantly.

The blast killed 23 people including Brigadier Ananda Hamangoda, de Silva's security office Police Constable Banda and the chairman of Lanka Cement Ranjit Godamuduna, all of whom were inside the same vehicle as the Minister. 11 civilians were killed including Carlyle Dias, a retired Senior Superintendent of Police who came out of retirement to serve as the Civil Affairs Officer (CAO) in Jaffna, and BMC official A. A. Dissanayake were also among 11 civilians killed in the blast. 59 were wounded including Minister de Silva who suffered injuries to his forehead, and was taken to the Palaly military hospital for emergency treatment.

Describing the suicide attack, Sunday Times columnist Iqbal Athas wrote

The message was quite clear. The LTTE would use the techniques it acquired to become one of the world's deadliest guerrilla outfits against its own people, the people whom it vowed to protect in the so-called state of Eelam it pledged to create.

For sacrificing his life to save Minister de Silva, Lance Corporal Seneviratne was awarded the highest award for gallantry presented by the Sri Lanka Army Parama Weera Vibhushanaya.
