= Mechanized Infantry Regiment =

- Active: 14 February 2007 - Present
- Country: Sri Lanka
- Branch: Sri Lanka Army
- Type: Mechanized Infantry
- Size: 4 regular battalions and 1 voluntary battalion
- Regimental Centre: Dambulla
- Nickname: MIR
- Mottos: ජවයෙන් පෙරමුණට; Jayaven Peramunata (Sinhala: Forward with Vigor)
- Colors
- Anniversaries: 14 February
- Engagements: Sri Lankan Civil War

Commanders
- Centre Commandant: Brig A M A Abeysinghe RWP RSP USP psc
- Brigade Commander: Brig J M A Jayasekara RSP USP
- Colonel of the Regiment: Maj Gen Chandana Wickramasinghe RWP RSP ndu psc
- Notable commanders: Field Marshal Sarath Fonseka General Jagath Jayasuriya; Maj Gen Milinda Peiris Maj Gen Priyanka Fernando

Insignia
- Flag

The Mechanized Infantry Regiment (MIR) is a mechanized infantry regiment of the Sri Lanka Army. It is made up of four regular battalions and a volunteer battalion. Establish in 2007 by Lt. Gen. Sarath Fonseka its battalions are equipped with Type 63 and WZ551 armoured personnel carriers make up the Mechanized Infantry Brigade. It is the youngest Infantry regiment of the Army.

== History ==
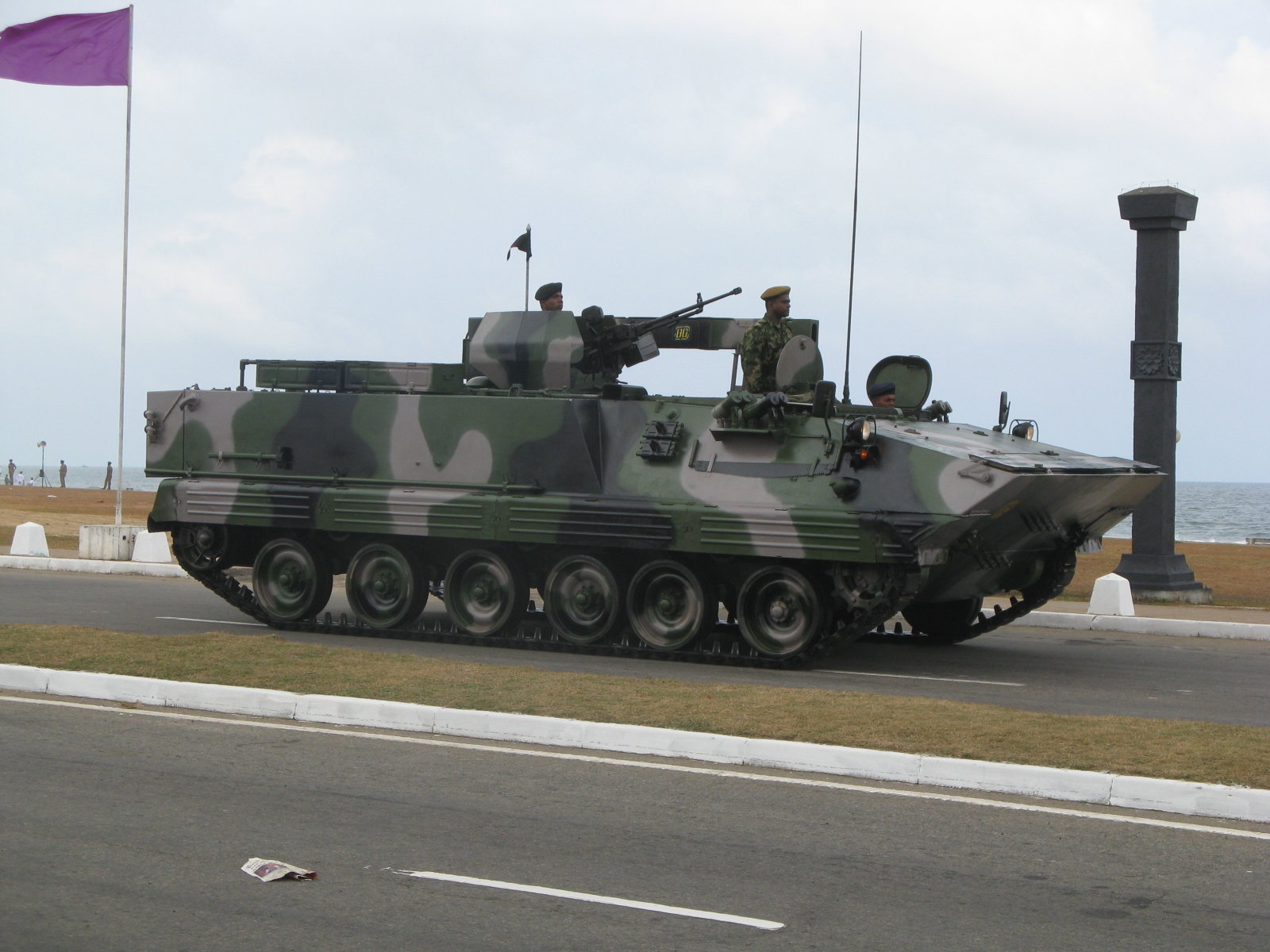
Norinco Type 89 (YW534) Armored Fighting Vehicle of MIR

The Mechanized Infantry Regiment was raised on the battlefield on 14 February at the divisional headquarters of the 53 Division at Kodikamam, Jaffna in order for the army to have specialized mechanized infantry units to deploy in battle, instead of using regular infantry along with armoured personnel carriers as it had done before. Three battalions where formed with officers and men from 3rd Light Infantry Battalion, 10th Sri Lanka Sinha Regiment, the 4th Gajaba Battalion and 5th & 6th Reconnaissance Regiments of the Sri Lanka Armoured Corps.

The 53-4 brigade which is made up of the newly formed battalions has since been designated as the Mechanized Infantry Brigade.

== Units ==
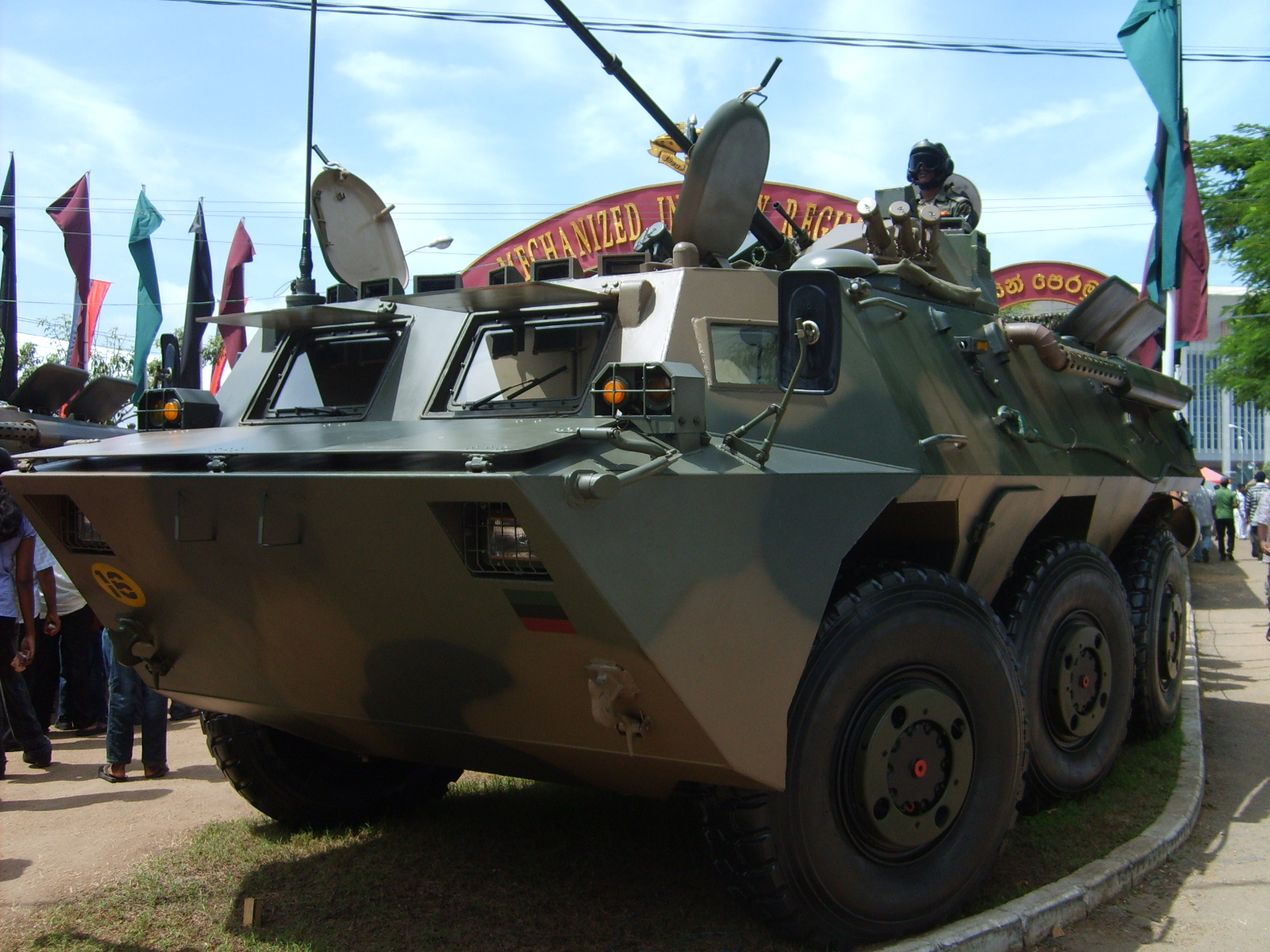
A WZ551 of the Mechanized Infantry Regiment.

=== Brigade ===
- Mechanized Infantry Brigade

=== Regular Battalions ===
- 1st Mechanized Infantry Battalion
- 2nd Mechanized Infantry Battalion
- 3rd Mechanized Infantry Battalion
- 4th Mechanized Infantry Battalion

=== Volunteer Battalions ===
- 5th Mechanized Infantry Battalion (Converted from 21st Sri Lanka National Guard on 1 June 2010)

== Order of precedence ==
Preceded by Vijayabahu Infantry Regiment	Order of Precedence	Succeeded by Commando Regiment
Preceded by Sri Lanka Armoured Corps (with armored vehicles)	Order of Precedence (with armored vehicles)	Succeeded by Sri Lanka Artillery (with Guns)

== See also ==
- Sri Lanka Army

== External links and sources ==
- Sri Lanka Army
