= 62 Division (Sri Lanka) =

- 62 Division flag
- Active: 10 October 2010 – present
- Country: Sri Lanka
- Branch: Sri Lanka Army
- Size: 20,289
- Part of: Security Forces Headquarters – Wanni
- Garrison/HQ: Galkulama, Northern Province

Commanders
- Current commander: Major General D H M A Wijesighe USP NDC psc

The 62 Division is a division of the Sri Lanka Army. Established on 10 October 2010, the division is currently based in Galkulama in the Northern Province. The division is a part of Security Forces Headquarters – Wanni and has three brigades and six battalions. Major General D H M A Wijesighe USP NDC psc has been commander of the division since 18 October 2016. The division is responsible for 1,620 square kilometres (625 sq mi) of territory.

== Organisation ==
The division is currently organised as follows:

- 621 Brigade
  - 14th Battalion, Sri Lanka Light Infantry
  - 17th Battalion, Sri Lanka National Guard
- 622 Brigade
  - 9th Battalion, Gajaba Regiment (based in Nelumwewa, Northern Province)
  - 27th Battalion, Gajaba Regiment (based in Pulmodai, Eastern Province)
- 623 Brigade
  - 26th Battalion, Sri Lanka Sinha Regiment
  - 11th Battalion, Gemunu Watch
