= Mechanized Infantry Brigade (Sri Lanka) =

Military unit of the Sri Lankan Army

- Active: 2007-Present
- Country: Sri Lanka
- Branch: Sri Lanka Army
- Type: Mechanized infantry
- Role: Close-quarters combat Combined arms Counterinsurgency; Forward observer Jungle warfare Maneuver warfare Raiding; Reconnaissance; Urban warfare
- Size: Brigade
- Part of: Security Forces Headquarters - Wanni
- Engagements: Sri Lankan Civil War

Commanders
- Current commander: Col. Ralph Nugera

The Mechanized Infantry Brigade is a mechanized infantry formation of the Sri Lanka Army. This grouping created a highly mobile brigade equipped with Type 63, BMP-2 and WZ551 armoured personnel carriers.

== Current formation ==
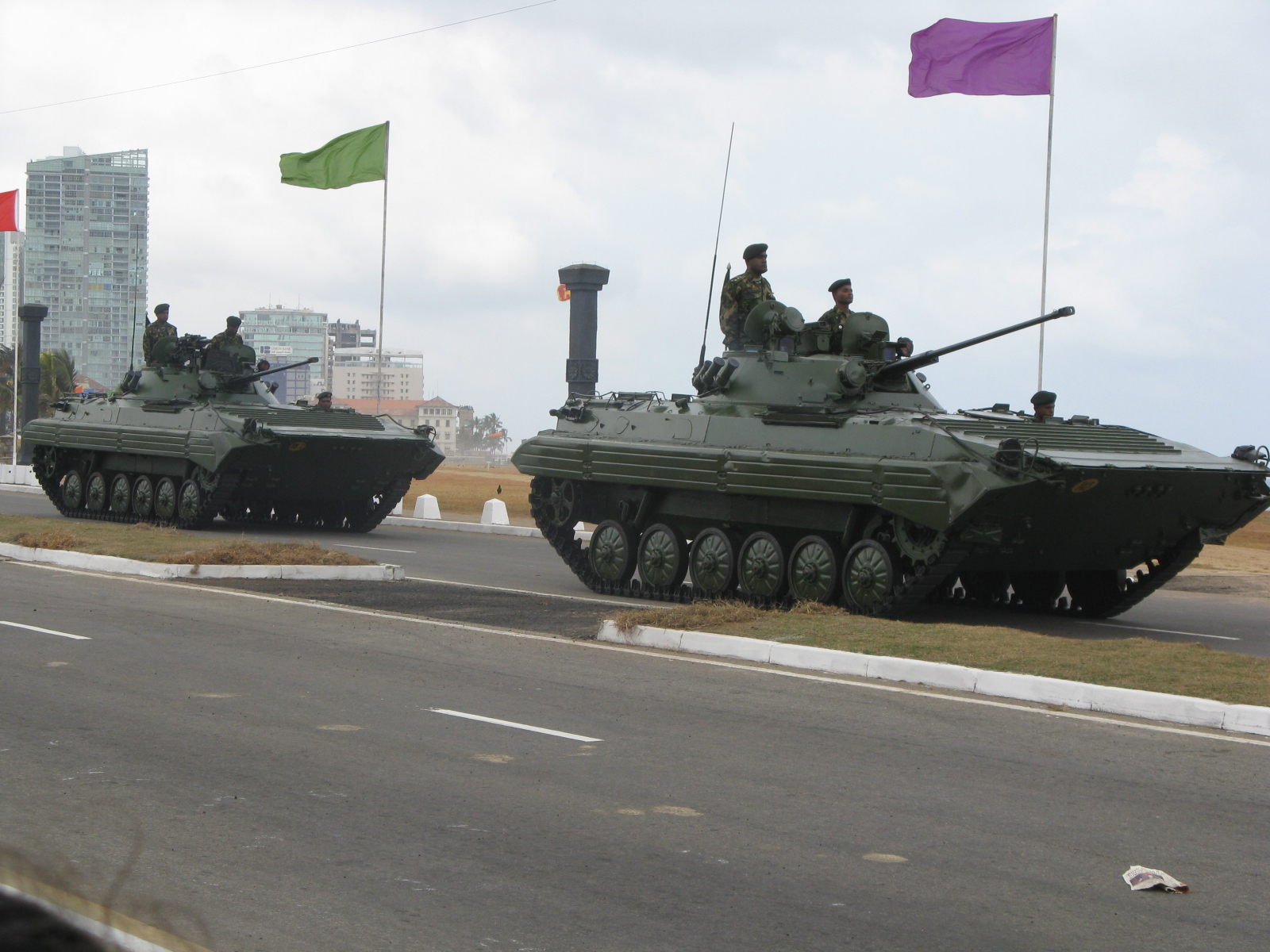
BMP-2 Infantry Fighting Vehicle

- 1st Battalion, Mechanized Infantry Regiment
- 2nd Battalion, Mechanized Infantry Regiment
- 3rd Battalion, Mechanized Infantry Regiment
- 4th Battalion, Mechanized Infantry Regiment
- 5th (V) Battalion, Mechanized Infantry Regiment

== See also ==
- Mechanized Infantry Regiment
