= 59 Division (Sri Lanka) =

Infantry division of the Sri Lankan Army

- Active: 2007 - Present
- Country: Sri Lanka
- Branch: Sri Lanka Army
- Type: Division (military)
- Size: 20,000+ troops
- Part of: Security Forces Headquarters – Mullaitivu
- Headquarters: Mullaitivu
- Engagements: Sri Lankan Civil War

Commanders
- Notable commanders: General Officer Commanding - Major General Mahinda Ranasinghe, Deputy General Officer Commanding - Major General Laksiri Waduge

The 59 Division is a division of the Sri Lanka Army formed in 2007. A principal offensive division it is currently deployed for combat operations in the Mullaitivu region.

== Sri Lankan Civil War ==
=== Operations ===
Formed in the Welioya sector it was tasked with advancing from Welioya to the LTTE stronghold of Mullaitivu. The division captured key LTTE bases in the jungles of Mullaitivu, these included Muhagam camp (May 30, 2008), Michael camp (May 30, 2008), Suganthan camp (July 27, 2008), Jeevan camp (August 16, 2008) that belong to the one four base complex. Troops of the 59 Division took western section of the Nayaru Lagoon on August 21, 2008 and on November 11 Kumalamunai was taken followed by Othiyamalai (November 29, 2008) and Mullayaveli (December 16, 2008)

The 59 Division participated in the Battle of Mullaitivu in January 2009, during which it captured Mullaitivu town, the last stronghold of the Tamil Tigers.

=== Towns liberated by 59 Division ===
#	Area Liberated	Date
1	Munagam Base	30 May 2008
2	Michael Base	4 July 2008
3	Suganthan camp	27 July 2008
4	Jeevan Base	16 August 2008
5	West of Nayaroo lagoon	21 August 2008
6	Gajabapura	23 October 2008
7	Kumulamunai village	11 November 2008
8	Otiyamalai	29 November 2008
9	Mulliyawalai	26 December 2008
10	Mullaitivu Town	25 January 2009

== Composition ==
- 59-1 Brigade
  - 1st Battalion, Sri Lanka Sinha Regiment
  - 11th Gemunu Watch
  - 14th Vjayabahu Infantry Battalion
- 59-2 Brigade
  - 1st Sri Lanka Light Infantry
  - 15th V Gemunu Watch
- 59-3 Brigade
  - 15th Sri Lanka Light Infantry
  - 9th Vjayabahu Infantry Battalion
  - 7th Gemunu Watch
