= Security Forces Headquarters – Mullaitivu =

- Active: 5 June 2009 – Present
- Allegiance: Sri Lanka
- Branch: Sri Lanka Army
- Size: 3 divisions
- Garrison/HQ: Nanthi Kadal Army Cantonment, Mullaitivu
- Anniversaries: 31 October
- Engagements: Sri Lankan Civil War
- Website: army.lk/sfhqmlt

Commanders
- Current commander: Maj. Gen. Dushyantha Rajaguru

Security Forces Headquarters – Mullaitivu (SFHQ-MLT) is a regional command of the Sri Lanka Army, that is responsible for the operational deployment and command all army units stationed in Mullaitivu District, this includes several divisions and the independent brigades. This a new command established to maintain control over newly recaptured area. It is one of the five Security Forces Headquarters and the General Officer Commanding it is one of the most senior officers in the army, the post is designated as Commander Security Forces Headquarters - Mullaitivu. The current Commander SFHQ-MLT is Major General N A J C Dias WWV RWP RSP USP ndc. He assumed his duties as the Sixth Commander of the Security Force Headquarters (Mullaitivu) on 8 January 2014. The SFHQ-MLT is based at Mullaitivu.

Although it is primary a command of the Sri Lanka Army it coordinates operations and deployments of ground units of the Navy, Air Force and police with that of the army in that area.

Area of responsibility includes Mullaitivu District and Kilinochchi District.

== Composition ==
- 59 Division, operating in the Mullaitivu District
  - 591 Brigade
  - 592 Brigade
  - 593 Brigade
- 64 Division
  - 641 Brigade
  - 642 Brigade
  - 643 Brigade
- 68 Division
  - 681 Brigade
  - 682 Brigade
  - 683 Brigade
