= Ananda Hamangoda =

Sri Lankan senior army officer (1950–1996)

Major General Ananda Hamangoda † RWP, RSP, USP
- Born: 1 November 1950; Kalutara, Sri Lanka
- Died: 4 July 1996 (aged 45); Stanley Road, Jaffna, Sri Lanka
- Military career
- Allegiance: Sri Lanka
- Branch: Sri Lanka Army
- Service years: 1972–1996
- Rank: Major General
- Service number: O/50666
- Unit: Sri Lanka Artillery
- Commands: 51-2 Brigade, 6th Field Regiment, Sri Lanka Artillery
- Conflicts: Insurrection 1987-89; Sri Lankan Civil War
- Awards: Rana Wickrama Padakkama; Rana Sura Padakkama; Uttama Seva Padakkama; Sri Lanka Armed Services Long Service Medal; Vadamarachchi Operation Medal; Purna Bhumi Padakkama; Riviresa Campaign Services Medal

Major General Ananda Sri Sisira Kumara Hamangoda, RWP, RSP, USP (1 November 1950 – 4 July 1996) was a senior Sri Lanka Army officer, who was the former brigade commander of the 51–2 Brigade based in Jaffna, when he was killed by a LTTE female suicide bomber.

== Early life and education ==
Born on 1 November 1950, Kalutara north. His father was a police officer and he had three brothers and a sister. He was educated at Maliyadeva College, Kurunagala, where he excelled in academic and sports. He was judged as the best orator and best overall student in the year 1971, served as deputy head prefect, house captain and was a sergeant of the college cadet platoon. In 1969 he was the leader of school western music band. His talents in sports showed great excellence. He received school colours on many occasions for his success in sports. In 1971 he played for the school badminton team. He won the coveted prize for the "Best Cadet" and the gold medal for the "Best All Round Student" in 1971.

== Military career ==
Hamangoda joined the Sri Lanka Army and received his basic officer cadet training at the Army Training Centre, Diyatalawa. He was thereafter commissioned as a second lieutenant on 1 January 1973 in the 4th Regiment, Sri Lanka Artillery. He was promoted to lieutenant on 5 January 1976, to captain on 5 January 1979, to major on 1 March 1983, to lieutenant colonel on 15 June 1990, to colonel on 20 April 1994 and to brigadier on 15 November 1995. He attended the senior tactics course at the Army Training Center; young officers course at Indian Army School of Artillery, Devlali; regimental signal officer course at the Pakistan Military Academy; senior officers artillery course at the Pakistan Army School of artillery, Nawashera and the senior commanders course at the Indian Army School of Artillery, Devlali. He attended the defence services course at the Defence Services Staff College, Wellington gaining the Psc and a MSc degree in Defence and Strategic Studies. He served as Adjutant of the 4th Regiment from 1981 to 1983, before taking up appointment as a staff officer in the 5th (Volunteer) Regiment from 1983 to 1985. He formed a new Field Battery in the newly formed 6th Regiment becoming its first battery commander, before serving as the first Second in Command in the newly raised 7th Light Artillery Regiment in November 1988. He served as the commanding officer of the 6th Field Regiment, Sri Lanka Artillery from October 1992 to March 1994. Brigadier Ananda Hamangoda was appointed as commanding officer of 51–2 Brigade in Jaffna in 1995 and was popular among the people of Jaffna.

His sporting prowess in cricket, volleyball as well as in boxing contributed to the promotion of sports activities in the Army while helping the Army produce a number of sportsmen of national and international standards.

== Death ==
Brigadier Hamangoda was killed on 4 July 1996, when a LTTE female suicide bomber detonated explosives strapped to her waist as the motorcade he was in stopped at Stanley Road in Jaffna town. The intended target, Housing and Construction Minister Nimal Siripala de Silva, escaped with minor injuries. However 20 people, including Brigadier Hamangoda and Ranjith Godamuna, chairman, Lanka Cement were killed and approximately 60 others sustained injuries.

He was posthumously promoted to the rank of Major General.

== Family ==
Hamangoda was married to Indrani Hamangoda, a teacher at Royal College, Colombo and they had two daughters Buwani, Maheshni and one son Dulshan.

== Awards ==
He has been honoured with the following gallantry and service medals during his career & following his death.

Gallantry decorations & medals

- Rana Sura Padakkama
- Rana Wickrama Padakkama

Distinguished service decorations & medals

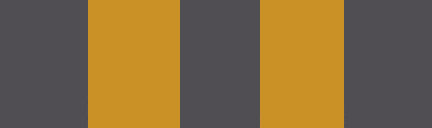
- Uttama Seva Padakkama
- Sri Lanka Armed Services Long Service Medal

Campaign medals

- Purna Bhumi Padakkama
- Vadamarachchi Operation Medal
- Riviresa Campaign Services Medal

Presidential commendation & medals

- President's Accession Medal

== Further sources ==
- Lance Corporal WIM Seneviratne (7th Light Infantry) by Ministry of Defence and Urban Development - Democratic Socialist Republic of Sri Lanka
- The Suffering Goes On by Ron Gluckman / Jaffna
- ONLY THE GOOD DIE YOUNG
- Maj. Gen. Hamangoda remembered
- Noble in death as in life
- SLAF feared missile attack on plane carrying wounded minister: A tough 30-year-long political journey
