= Mullaitivu =

Mullaitivu: முல்லைத்தீவு; මුලතිව්
- Town
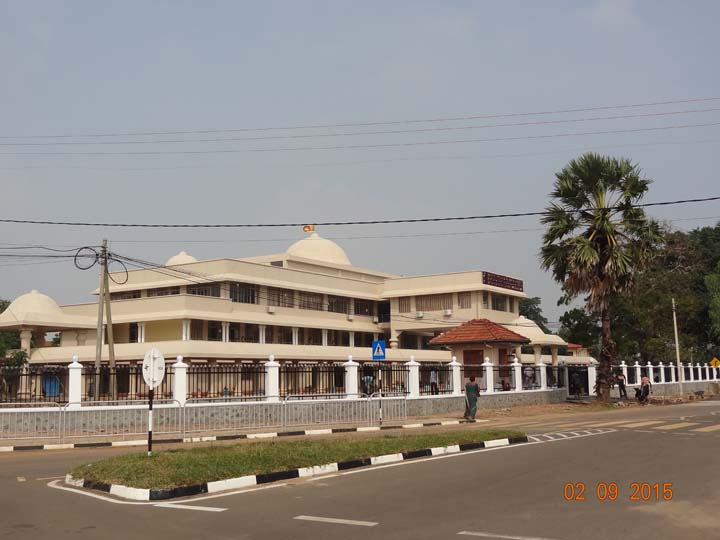
- District secretariat in Mullaitivu

- Location in Northern Province
- Coordinates: 9°17′N 80°48′E
- Country: Sri Lanka
- Province: Northern
- District: Mullaitivu
- DS Division: Maritimepattu

Population (2012)
  - Total: 28,973
- Time zone: UTC+5:30 (Sri Lanka Standard Time Zone)

Mullaitivu (Tamil: முல்லைத்தீவு, romanized: Mullaittīvu; Sinhala: මුලතිව්, romanized: Mulativ) is the main town of Mullaitivu District, situated on the north-eastern coast of Northern Province, Sri Lanka. A largely fishing settlement, the town in the early twentieth century grew as an anchoring harbour of the small sailing vessels transporting goods between Colombo and Jaffna. The town has a District Secretary's office, many other government institutions and schools located in and around the area.

== History ==
During the Kandyan Wars, the British government house in Mullaitivu was attacked by forces of Pandara Vanniyan and Dissava of Nuwara Kalawiya who laid siege to the fort. Captain Drieberg with his force of Malays escaped from the fort in boats and reached Jaffna.

During the Sri Lankan Civil War, Mullaitivu became an isolated base for the Sri Lankan armed forces. In a pitched battle the LTTE succeeded in overrunning the base in 1996. Following this the Sri Lankan armed forces withdrew from Mullaitivu which allowed the LTTE to gain control of the area. It was damaged by the 2004 Indian Ocean tsunami with a large loss of life. The Sri Lankan Army took control of the town on January 25, 2009, in the Battle of Mullaitivu in its offensive against the LTTE. Security Forces Headquarters – Mullaitivu was established on June 5, 2009 in the town.

== Gallery ==
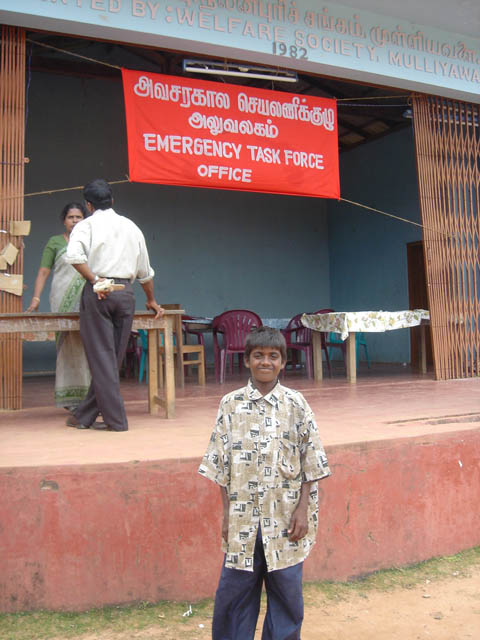
Welfare office, 2004

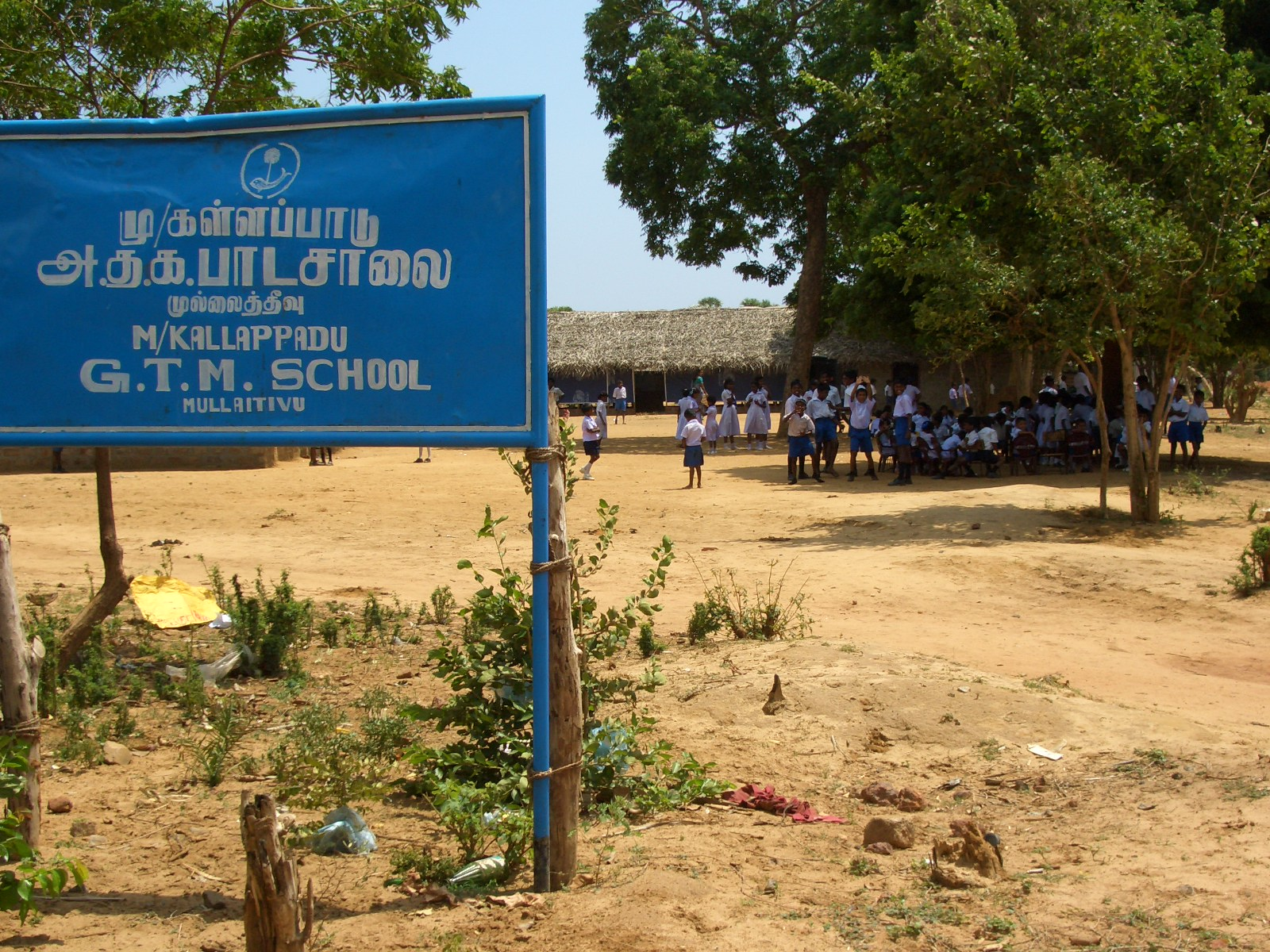
Mullaitivu Kallapadu GTM School

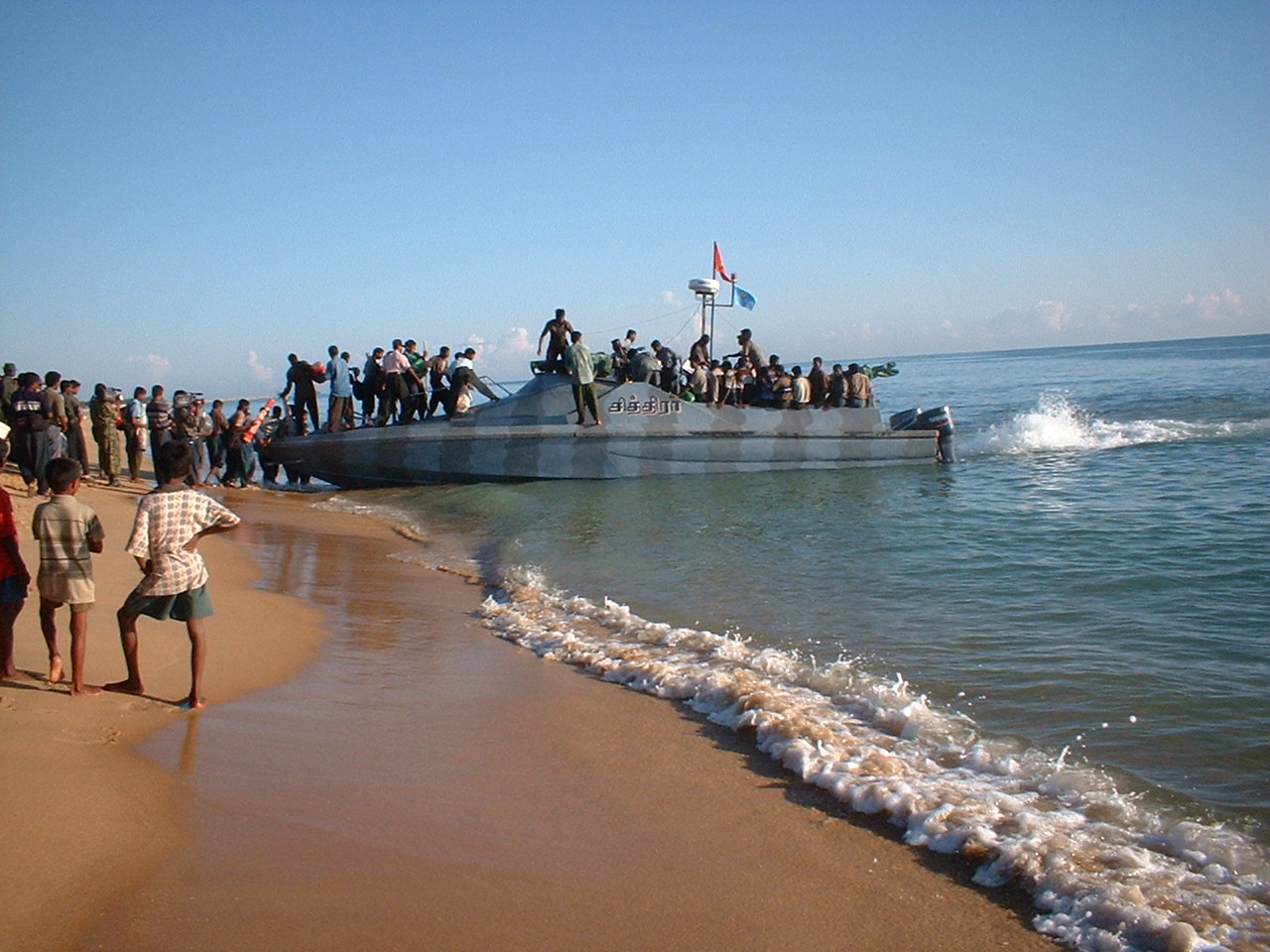
LTTE sea tigers loading a ship at Mullaitivu, 2002

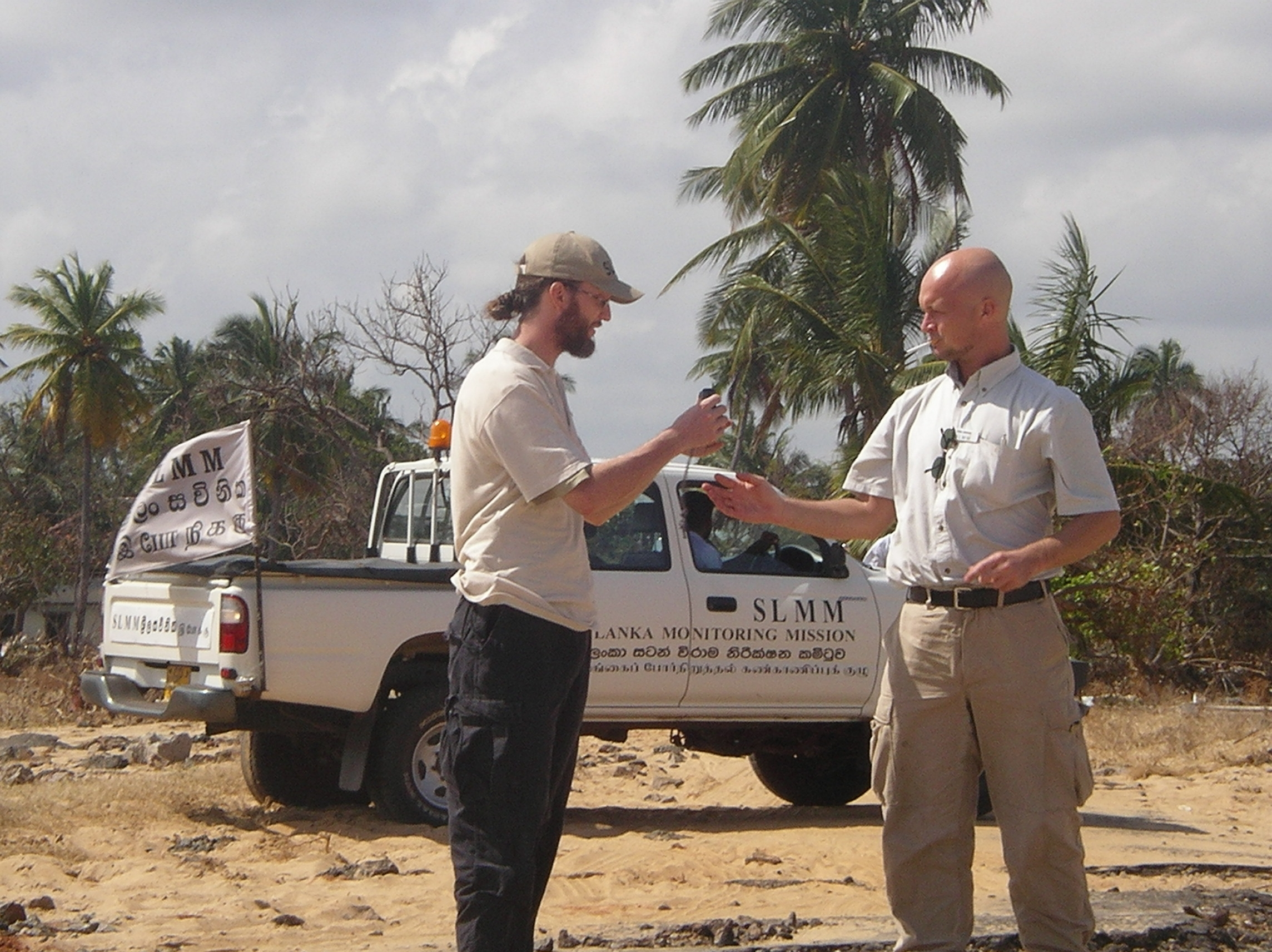
Norwegian monitoring mission during the ceasefire, 2006
