= Ahmad Efendi Chalabizadeh =

- Əhməd Əfəndi Çələbizadə
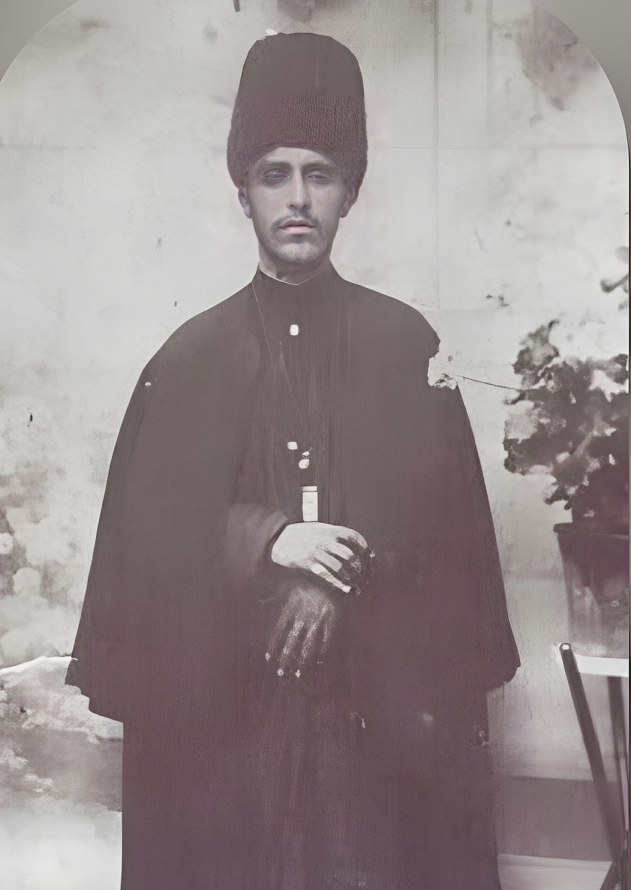
- Born: 1892; Quba
- Died: 1937-09-01
- Cause of death: Victim of repression
- Father: Abdulrahim Efendi Chalebizade

Ahmad Efendi Chalabizadeh was the imam of the Quba Juma Mosque, the creator of the Quba Historical and Ethnographic Museum, a writer, ethnographer, and a victim of repression.

He served as the imam of the Quba Juma Mosque from 1922 to 1924. In 1924, he laid the foundations of the historical and ethnographic museum in Quba. Between 1935 and 1937, he authored a book titled Quba – Customs and Rules of the Era about the traditions and customs of the Quba region. He was shot on September 1, 1937.

== Life ==
Ahmad Efendi Abdulrahim oglu Chalabizadeh was born in 1892 in the city of Quba. His father, Abdulrahim Efendi, served as the imam of the Quba Juma Mosque. He received his primary education at the madrasa where his father taught and learned Arabic and Persian languages there. In 1912, he studied at the South Caucasus religious school named after Sunitsky in Tbilisi. After completing his studies in 1913, he returned to Quba and was appointed as an assistant to the imam of the Juma Mosque. In 1922, after his father, Imam Abdulrahim Efendi, died, Ahmad Efendi was appointed as the secretary of the Juma Mosque. Due to his resistance against the Soviet occupation and policies against religion, Ahmad Efendi publicly declared in a newspaper in 1930 that he voluntarily withdrew from the position of a mullah. During the Stalinist repressions in 1937, Ahmad Efendi was arrested and taken to Baku. He was shot on September 1, 1937, by the decision of the NKVD troika. On November 6, 1956, he was acquitted posthumously (as with many of Stalin's victims of the Great Purge) and politically rehabilitated after a determination that he had beeninnocent.

== Creativity ==
After the April occupation, Ahmad Efendi dedicated his life to the exploration of Azerbaijani history. Through his initiative, the Quba Ethnographic Museum was established in 1924 beside the Juma Mosque, using materials he collected about Quba's history from the madrasa where he taught. As a result of Ahmad Efendi's efforts, between 1924 and 1935, the museum accumulated ancient manuscripts, weapons, ancient textiles, paintings, silver and gold coins, craftsmanship items, samples of national clothing, various tools, and literary and antique items in Arabic, Persian, Turkish, and Russian languages, obtained from different institutions, personal homes, and through donations. The museum's collection also included exhibits safeguarded in various schools and at the Sakinakhanim mosque, forming the cornerstone of its holdings.

In August 1932, during a meeting of the Quba District Executive Committee, a special issue was discussed concerning the establishment of a museum in Quba city. The meeting reviewed the theses and project proposals prepared by specialists for the purpose of setting up the museum. The initial section of the exhibition was dedicated to the region's nature, displaying various maps and samples of the area's flora and useful minerals. Subsequent sections focused on the history, culture, and ethnography of the region. These sections were titled: "Ancient Cultural Monuments of the Former Quba District," "Materials from the Period before the Formation of Quba Khanate," "Seizure of Quba Khanate by the Russian Empire," and "The Period of the Commandant's Office." Additionally, an "Ethnography" section was included, showcasing the life, traditions, arts, and particularly the widespread carpet-making and craftsmanship of both Azerbaijani people and minority groups residing in the region. The exhibition also included materials reflecting the cultural, educational, and developmental aspects of Quba during the 1920s and 1930s.

The Quba Historical and Ethnographic Museum operated on a public basis from 1924 to 1935. On May 14, 1935, by the order of the People's Commissariat of Education, Ahmad Chalabizadeh was appointed as the director of the Quba Historical Museum. However, following Ahmad Chalabizadeh's repression, the museum's activities were halted, all exhibits were dispersed, and valuable books were destroyed.

=== His book ===
Ahmad Chalabizadeh conducted field research on the ethnography of the Quba region in the 1930s. Between 1935 and 1937, he authored a book titled Quba – Customs and Rules of the Era about the traditions and customs of the Quba region. This manuscript consists of three parts. The first part, titled "Ethnographic Materials on the Quba Region," comprises information gathered from 57 ordinary school notebooks. The second part, named "Notes on Religious Customs in the Quba Region," is extracted from six notebooks. The third part, titled "Records on Religious Traditions in the Quba Region," is sourced from seven notebooks. The first part was written in 1935, while the second and third parts were penned in 1937. Each part consists of separate chapters.

Ahmad Chalabizadeh's work is an extensive collection of ethnographic materials, presenting the customs, traditions, and beliefs of the people in detail. The first part of the work starts with information about human eternity and its reasons, followed by insights into various aspects. It covers naming traditions for newborns, beliefs associated with newly born babies, lullabies sung at a baby's cradle, naming customs, endearing words spoken to infants, and details about children's games. The author meticulously describes all the customs of Quba in sequence. After wedding customs, the book delves into specific illnesses and their treatments, mourning traditions, festivals, especially focusing on the Nowruz celebration and the rituals of Muharram, illuminating each banned tradition during these rituals. In the section about Quba's cuisine and cooking methods, the author lists ten types of pilaf and explains the cooking techniques for various dishes. The text also preserves a substantial number of words spoken in the Quba dialect.
