= Uzunmeşə =

Uzunmeshe
- Municipality
- Location within Azerbaijan
- Coordinates: 41°21′35″N 48°21′55″E
- Country: Azerbaijan
- Rayon: Quba

Population
  - Total: 196
- Time zone: UTC+4 (AZT)
  - Summer (DST): UTC+5 (AZT)

Uzunmeshe, or Long Forest (Azerbaijani: Uzunmeşə) is a village and municipality in the Quba Rayon of Azerbaijan. It has a population of 205. The village is famous for its English name, Long Forest, which is shared between English speakers, and the resort of the same name. There are also springs and beautiful landscapes. Uzunmeshe is located in north-eastern Azerbaijan, 26 km northeast from Quba City between the forests and landscapes. There are 50 houses located there and a population of 250 students, but in the summer the maximum inhabitants are 1000.Azerbaijani ambassador in France Leyla Abdullayeva from this village
