= Haji Jafar Mosque =

Mosque in Quba, Azerbaijan

- Azerbaijani: Hacı Cəfər Məscidi; Arabic: مسجد الحاج جعفر (قوبا)
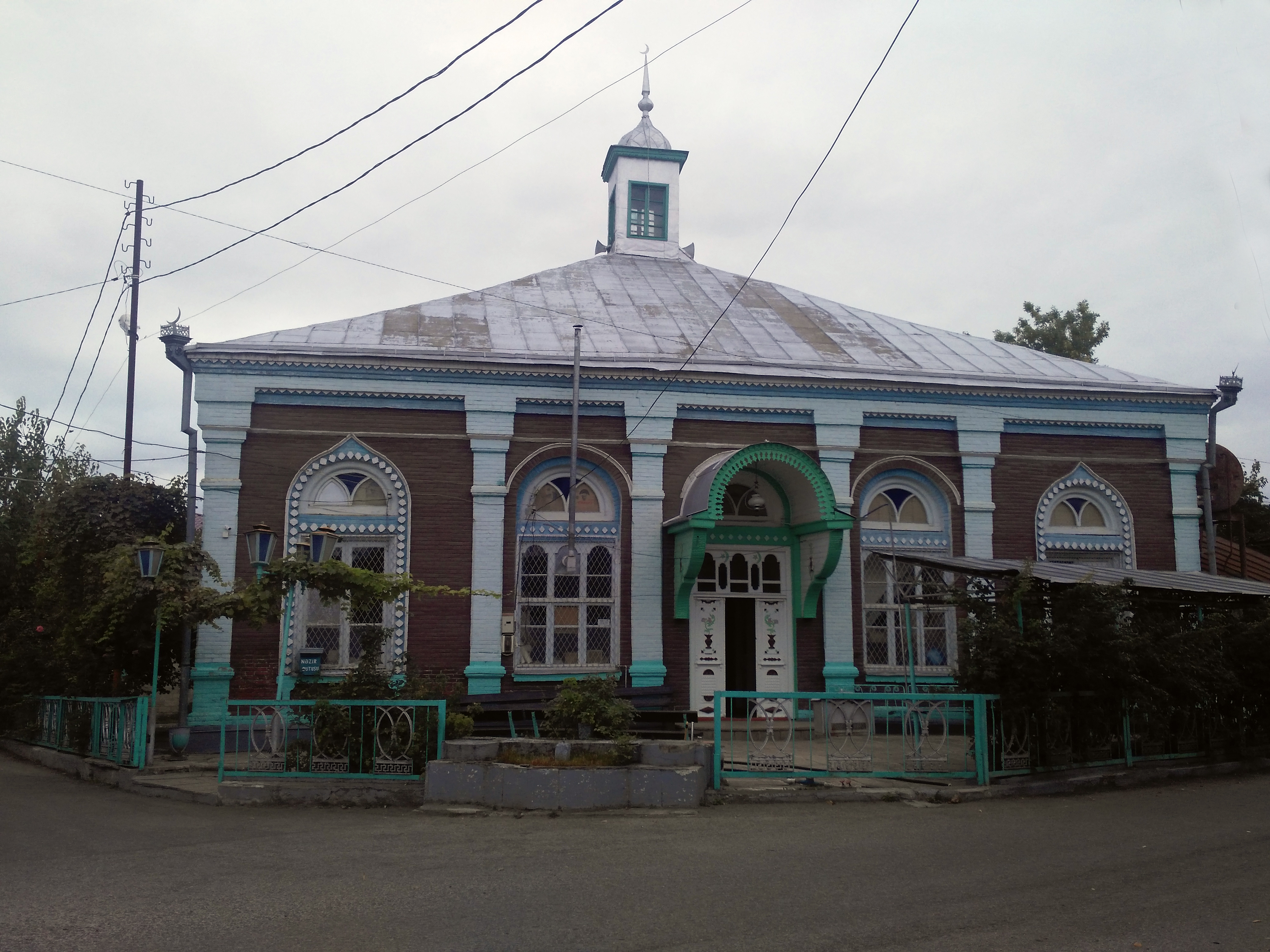
- The mosque in 2020

- Location of the mosque in Azerbaijan

Religion
- Affiliation: Shia Islam
- Ecclesiastical or organizational status: Mosque (1905–1928); Profane use (1928–1990); Mosque (since 1992)
- Status: Active

Location
- Location: Quba
- Interactive map of Haji Jafar Mosque
- Coordinates: 41°21′46″N 48°30′35″E

Architecture
- Type: Mosque architecture
- Completed: 1905

Specifications
- Interior area: 400 m^{2} (4,300 sq ft)
- Dome: One

The Haji Jafar Mosque (Azerbaijani: Hacı Cəfər Məscidi; Arabic: مسجد الحاج جعفر (قوبا)) is a Shia Islam mosque and historical architectural monument located in the city of Guba, Azerbaijan.

Completed in 1905, the former mosque and monument was included in the list of nationally significant immovable historical and cultural monuments by the decision of the Cabinet of Ministers of the Republic of Azerbaijan on August 2, 2001, under decree number 132.

== About ==
The Haji Jafar Mosque was constructed in 1905 in the center of Guba city. It is the largest mosque in the city, covering an area of 400 m^{2} (4,300 sq ft). The mosque is named after Haji Jafar, who is believed to have been its builder.

As per the accounts of the city's elders, during the Guba massacre, Armenian forces intended to gather the elderly, women, and children in this mosque with the horrific intention of burning them alive. At that dire moment, the mosque's muezzin, Haji Baba, courageously intervened and prevented this terrible act. Haji Baba took in orphaned Armenian girls, raising them as if they were his own daughters, and ensured their safety. He then reported this to the Armenians, telling them that they were caring for their daughters as their own children. As a result, the Armenians abandoned their plan to burn people alive.

=== Soviet occupation ===
Following the Soviet occupation, in 1928, an official campaign against religion began. In December of that year, the Azerbaijan Communist Party Central Committee transferred many mosques, churches, and synagogues to the balance of clubs for educational purposes. If there were approximately 3,000 mosques in Azerbaijan in 1917, by 1927, that number had reduced to 1,700, and by 1933, it had further decreased to only 17.

After the occupation, the mosque was closed, and in the 1930s, the dome of the mosque was dismantled. In the early years, it was used as a student dormitory, but later, it was repurposed as a storage facility. Subsequently, the dome was restored in 1943.

=== After independence ===
The monument was included in the list of nationally significant immovable historical and cultural monuments by the decision of the Cabinet of Ministers of the Republic of Azerbaijan on August 2, 2001, under decree number 132.

== Architecture ==
The mosque, constructed from fired bricks, consists of a building with four rooms. The mosque has a rectangular floor plan, with the main prayer hall and auxiliary rooms in front of it. The primary entrance to the mosque is located on the northern side, and the mihrab (prayer niche) is situated opposite the door. In the center of the main hall, there are two columns to support the ceiling. There is a small prayer area for women located on the second floor. The mosque's dome is covered from the outside with white iron, and the minaret is positioned above the dome. To access the minaret, there are stairs inside the mosque on the right side. The mihrab has a simple design and is made of walnut wood. The mosque's ancient carved wooden door, made without the use of nails, is still preserved and protected to this day.

== See also ==
- Shia Islam in Azerbaijan
- List of mosques in Azerbaijan
