= Quba mass grave =

Coordinates: 41°21′40″N 48°29′30″E

- Quba kütləvi məzarlığı
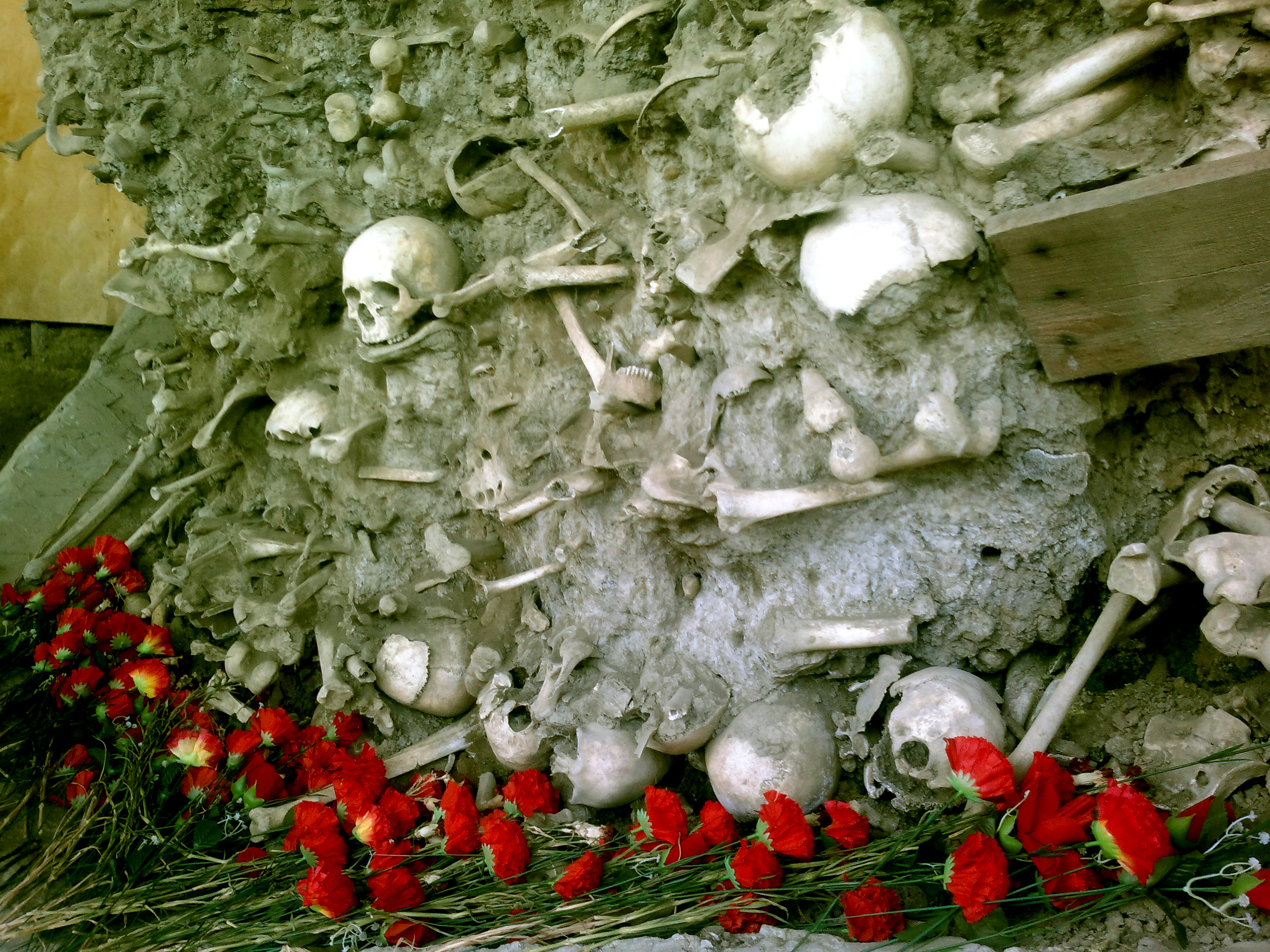
- Interactive map of Quba mass grave

Details
- Location: Quba
- Country: Azerbaijan
- Type: Mass grave

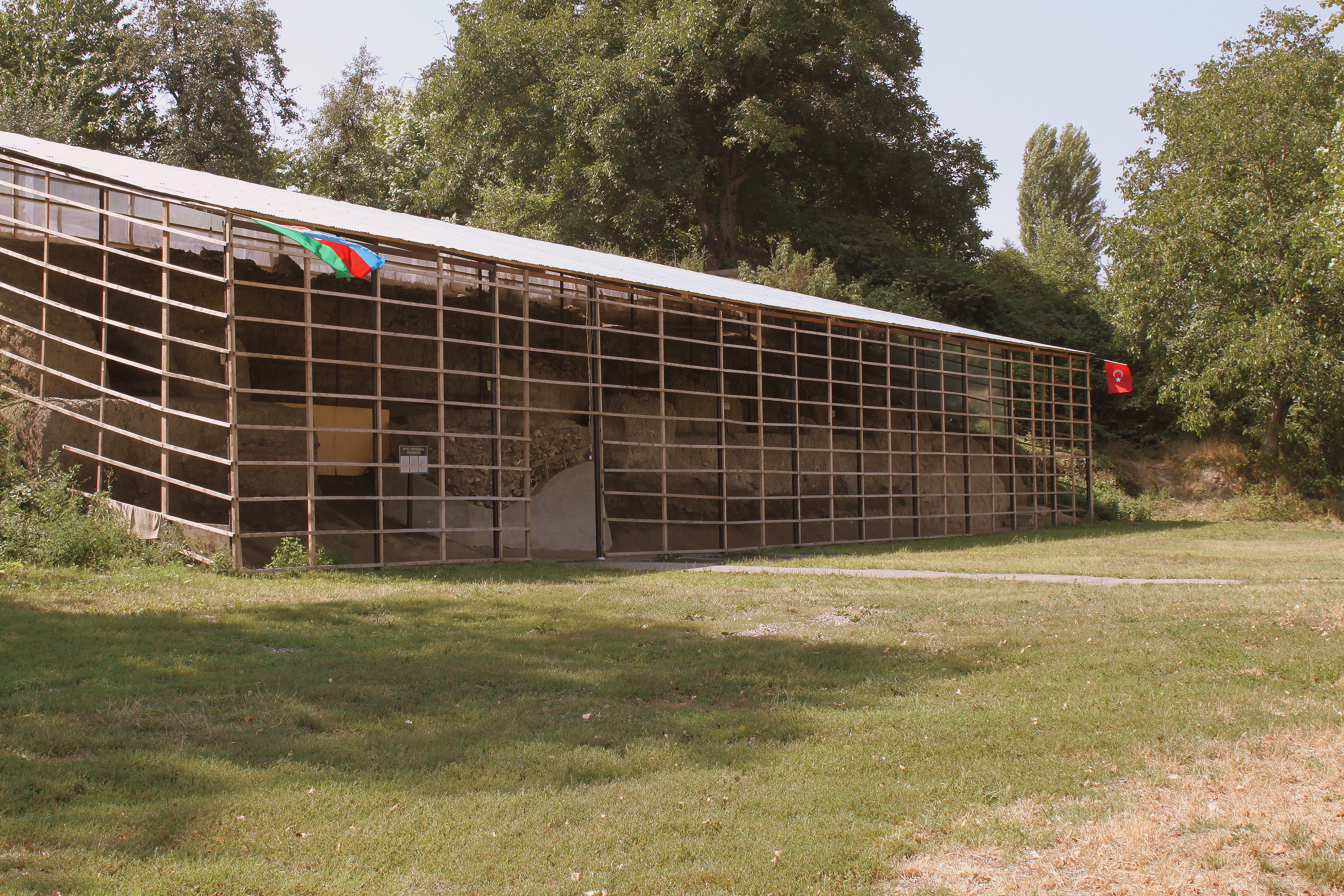
The mass grave site

The Quba mass grave is a mass grave site from 1918 in the town of Quba in northeastern Azerbaijan.

== Investigation ==
Once the burial site was uncovered, the Institute of Archeology and Ethnography of the Azerbaijan National Academy of Sciences dispatched a forensic expedition to the location. The expedition released its first forensics report on April 13, 2007, stating that the preponderance of commingled skeletal remains suggests that the people were first executed and then thrown into wells, 2.5 to 5 meters deep. Gahraman Agayev, the leader of the forensic expedition, followed up on this by reporting the discovery of two main wells and two canals with human bones. The research has discovered the remains of more than 400 people belonging to different age groups in the grave. Of these, 50 belong to children, more than 100 to women and others mainly to elderly men. The Azerbaijani government stated that the burial was from a massacre committed against the local population by Armenian gangs in 1918.

== Reactions ==
In response to the mass grave discovery, Levon Yepiskoposyan, supervisor of Human Genetics at the Institute of Molecular Biology in the Armenian National Academy of Sciences and president of the Armenian Anthropological Society, and Hayk Kotanjian, President of the Association of Political Science at the Ministry Doctor of Political Sciences, sent letters urging the President of the National Academy of Sciences of Azerbaijan, Mahmud Kerimov, to form a joint committee to examine the remains found. As of 2013, those letters have not received a response from Azerbaijani officials.

Hayk Demoyan, the director of the Armenian Genocide Museum-Institute, has stated that no foreign experts have examined the human remains.
