= İqrığ =

- Municipality
- Location within Azerbaijan
- Coordinates: 41°21′52″N 48°35′55″E
- Country: Azerbaijan
- Rayon: Quba

Population
  - Total: 1,502
- Time zone: UTC+4 (AZT)
  - Summer (DST): UTC+5 (AZT)

İqrığ (also, İqriq, Igrik, and Igrykh) is a village and municipality in the Quba Rayon of Azerbaijan. It has a population of 1,502.
