= Sakinakhanim mosque =

Former mosque in Quba, Azerbaijan

Sakinakhanim Mosque
- Azerbaijani: Səkinəxanım Məscidi; Arabic: مسجد سكينة خانم
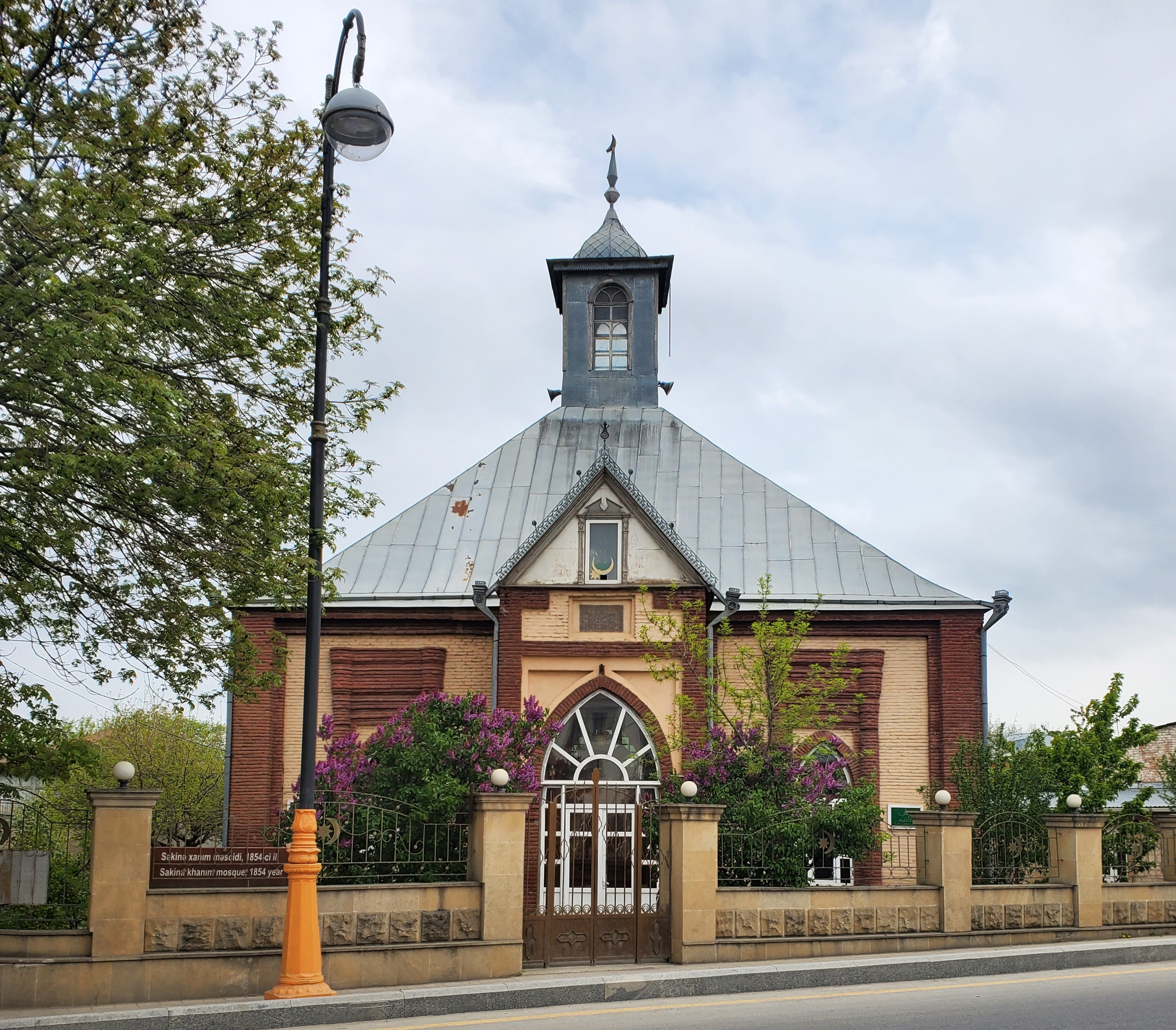
- The former mosque in 2021

- Location of the former mosque in Azerbaijan

Religion
- Affiliation: Shia Islam (former)
- Ecclesiastical or organisational status: Mosque (1854–1928); Profane use (1928–1992)
- Status: Abandoned (as a mosque)

Location
- Location: Quba
- Country: Azerbaijan
- Coordinates: 41°21′40″N 48°30′42″E

Architecture
- Type: Mosque architecture
- Style: Islamic
- Completed: 1854
- Materials: Bricks

The Sakinakhanim Mosque (Azerbaijani: Səkinəxanım Məscidi; Arabic: مسجد سكينة خانم) is a former Shia Islam mosque and historical architectural monument located in the city of Guba, Azerbaijan.

Completed in 1854, the former mosque was constructed by Sakina Bakikhanova in honour of her husband, Abbasgulu Bakikhanov. The monument was included in the list of nationally significant immovable historical and cultural monuments by the decision of the Cabinet of Ministers of the Republic of Azerbaijan on August 2, 2001, under decree number 132.

== About ==
The Sakinakhanim Mosque was built by Sakinakhanim Bakikhanova, the spouse of Azerbaijani writer and historian Abbasgulu Bakikhanov, to commemorate his memory. Sakina Khanim Bakikhanova died in 1853, and the construction of the mosque was completed in 1854 after her death.

=== Soviet occupation ===
After the Soviet occupation, in 1928, there began an official campaign against religion in Azerbaijan. In December of that year, the Azerbaijan Communist Party Central Committee transferred many mosques, churches, and synagogues to the balance of clubs for educational purposes. If there were approximately 3,000 mosques in Azerbaijan in 1917, by 1927, that number had reduced to 1,700, and by 1933, it had further decreased to 17. In the 1930s, as part of the campaign against religion, mosques were closed and the surrounding religious schools and auxiliary buildings were dismantled. In the early years, the mosque building was used as a warehouse, and later, it was repurposed as a sewing workshop.

=== After independence ===
After Azerbaijan regained its independence, in 1992, renovation work was carried out in the mosque, and it was made accessible to the public. The area around the mosque was landscaped, and infrastructure such as water, sewage, electricity, and gas lines were restored. Between 1990 and 1993, auxiliary buildings, such as a madrasa, were also constructed.

The monument was included in the list of nationally significant immovable historical and cultural monuments by the decision of the Cabinet of Ministers of the Republic of Azerbaijan on August 2, 2001, under decree number 132.

== Architecture ==
The mosque is constructed from red bricks and has a cylindrical shape. Each wall-tile features a semicircular, tile-shaped window. The facade is adorned with an original cornice made of thin bricks. The flooring is covered with stone slabs, and the ceiling is supported by four large columns. The pulpit is made of walnut wood and consists of eight pillars. The mosque has a square shape with nine windows and two doors. It has a height of 27 meters and rises 9 meters above the ground. The diameter of the dome is 4.5 meters, and it is covered with an iron layer. The dome is surrounded by numerous tiles. The central part of the dome is delicately decorated with national patterns. Near the mosque, there is also a madrasa, which has been in operation since 1994.

The mosque's minaret is located on top of the mosque's dome, and to access it, there is an entrance inside the mosque.

On the epigraphic inscription located above the entrance portico of the mosque building, verses from the Kuran are inscribed in Arabic and Persian languages. The inscription, translated into English, reads:

"Indeed, those who believe in Allah and the Last Day are those who repair the mosques of Allah. (Surah At-Tawbah, Verse 18, a part of it);

The Prophet, peace be upon him, said: Whoever builds a mosque, even the size of a bird's nest, Allah will build for him a palace in paradise (Hadith);

Therefore, this mosque was completely built and restored in the month of Muharram of the year 1271 (September 1854) in memory of Haji Abbasgulu Bakikhanov and his wife Sakinakhanim. May Allah forgive them both. After the passing of Sakina Khanum, the mosque was fully constructed and restored in the month of Muharram in the year 1271, which corresponds to September 1854."

== See also ==
- Shia Islam in Azerbaijan
- List of mosques in Azerbaijan
