= Quba =

City in the Republic of Azerbaijan

- City & Municipality
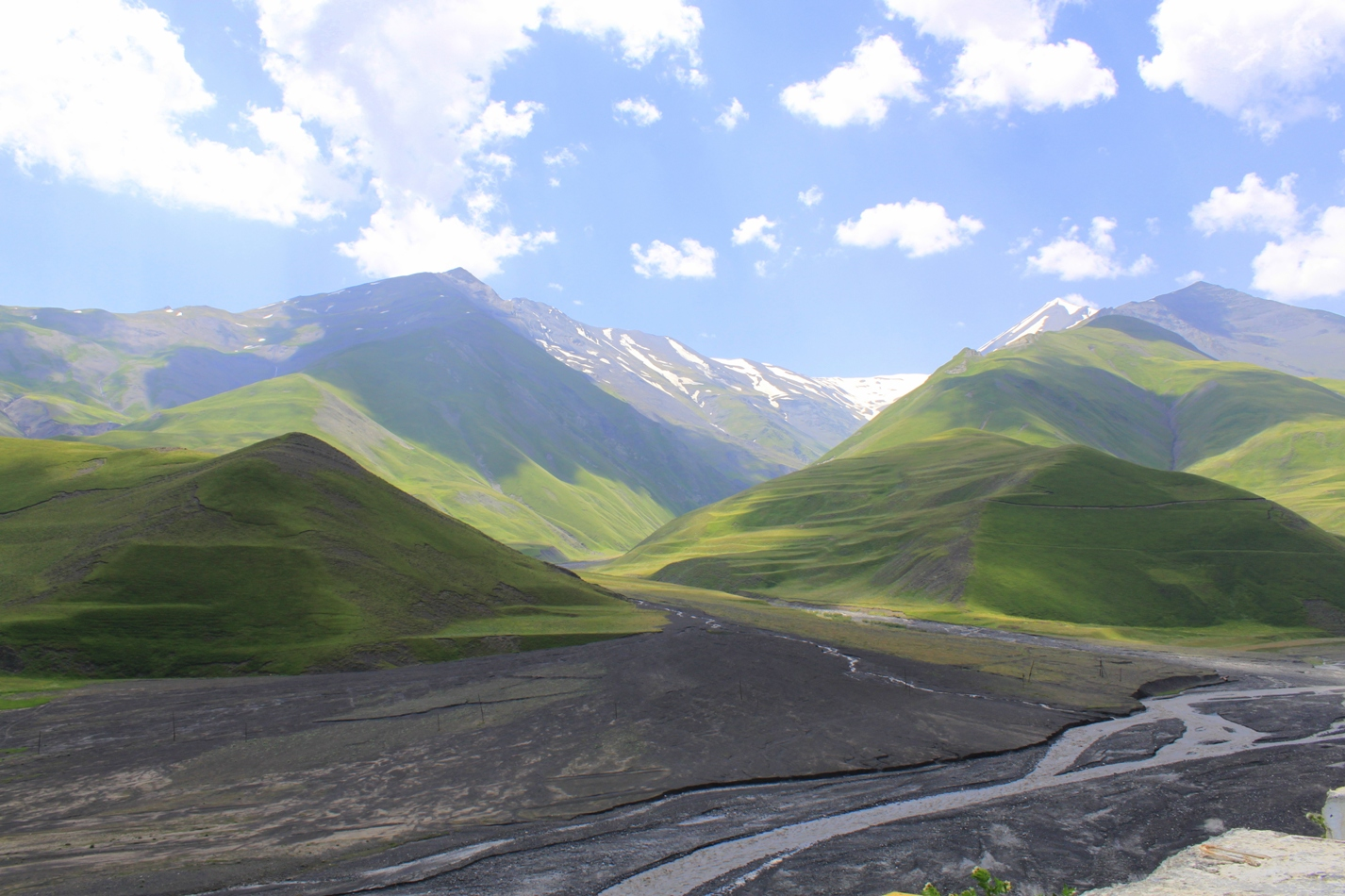
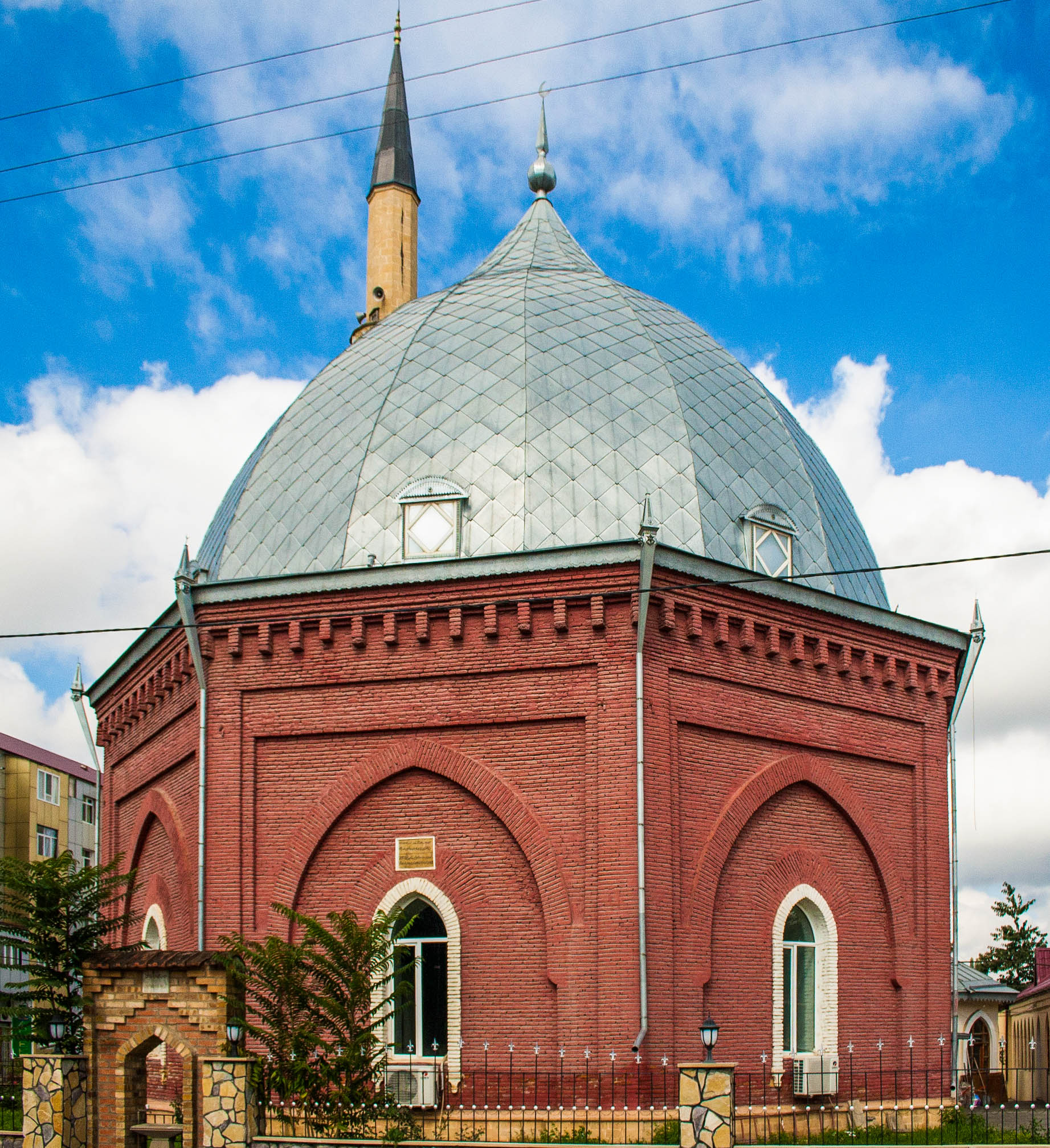
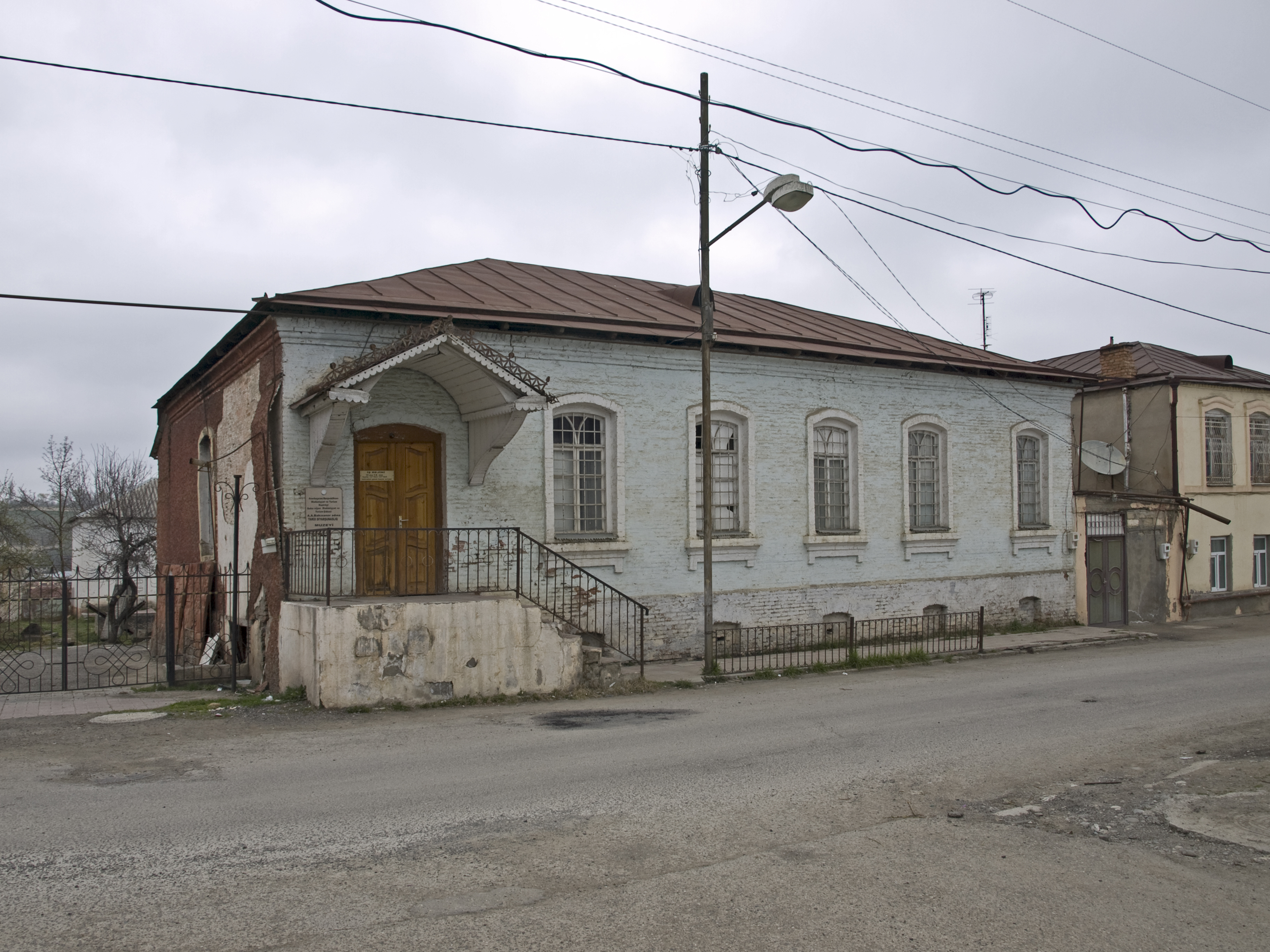
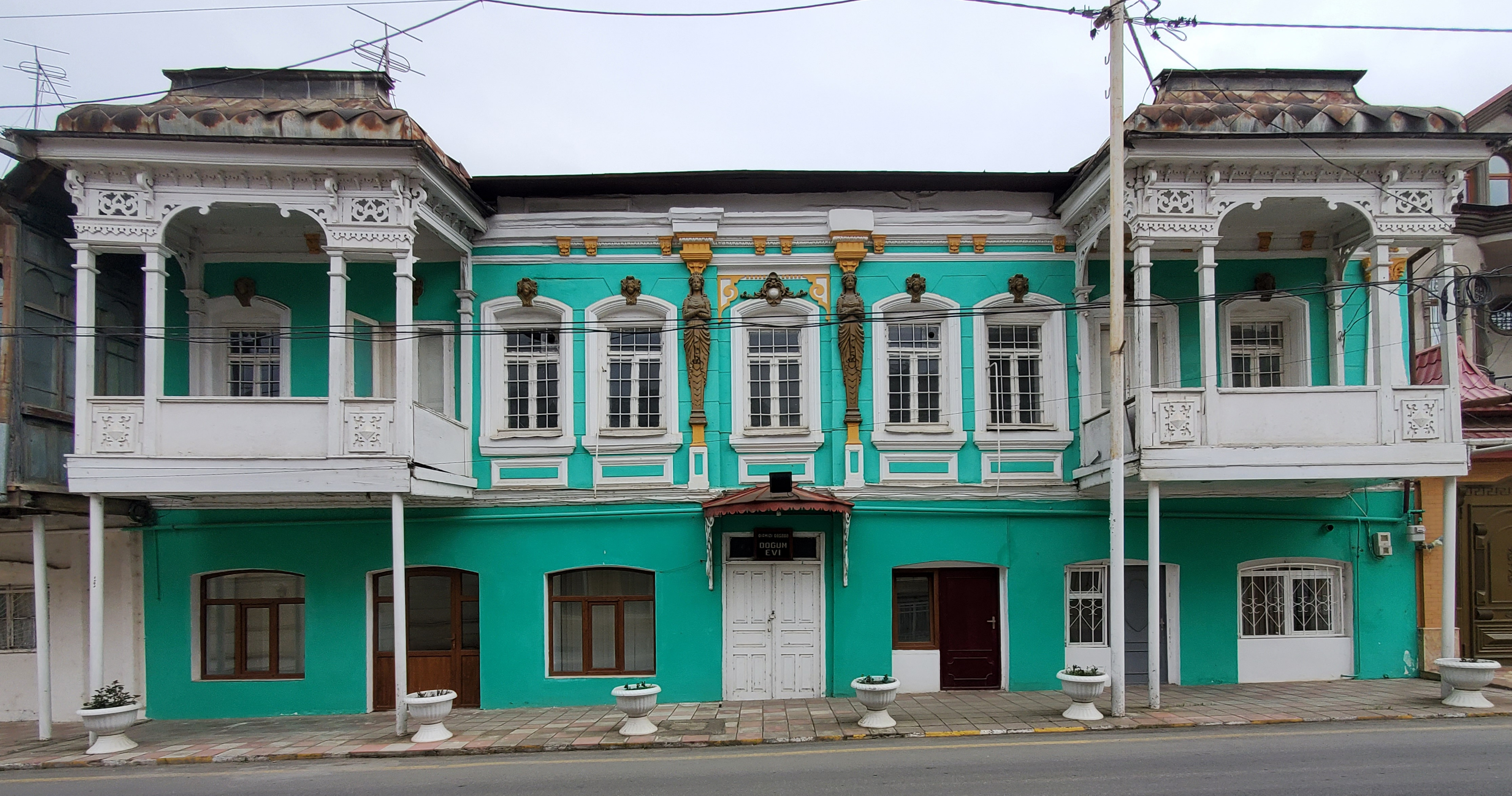
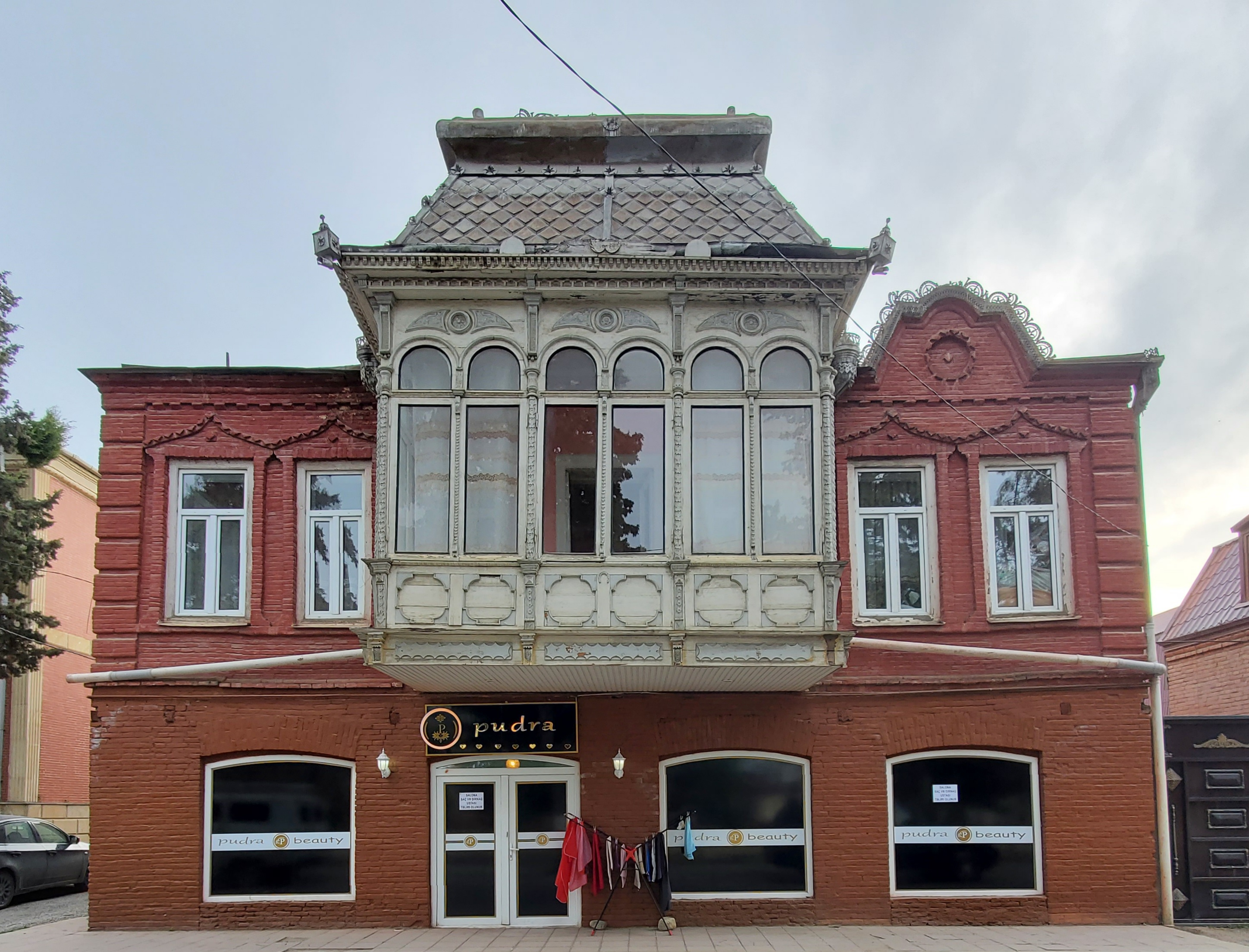
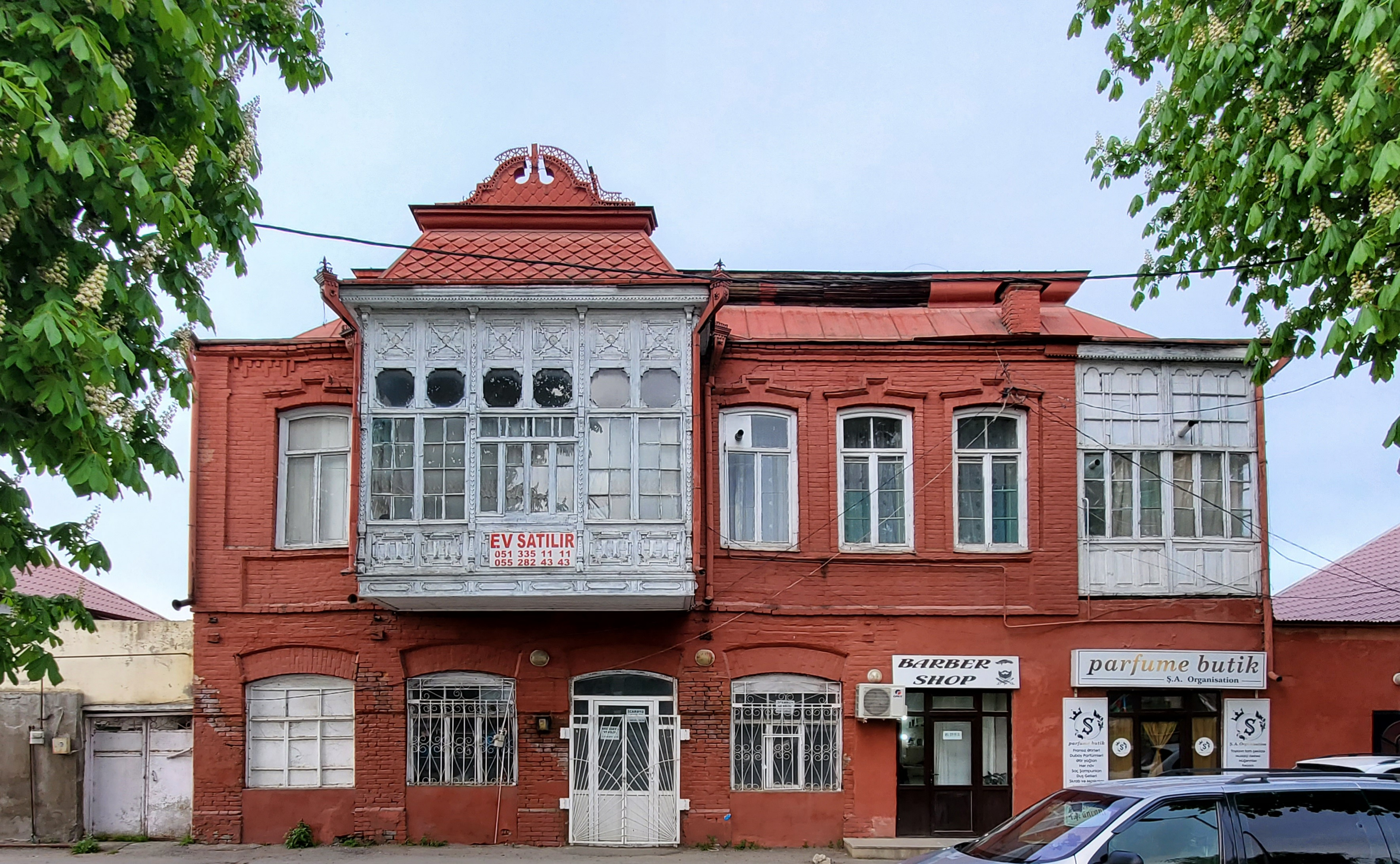
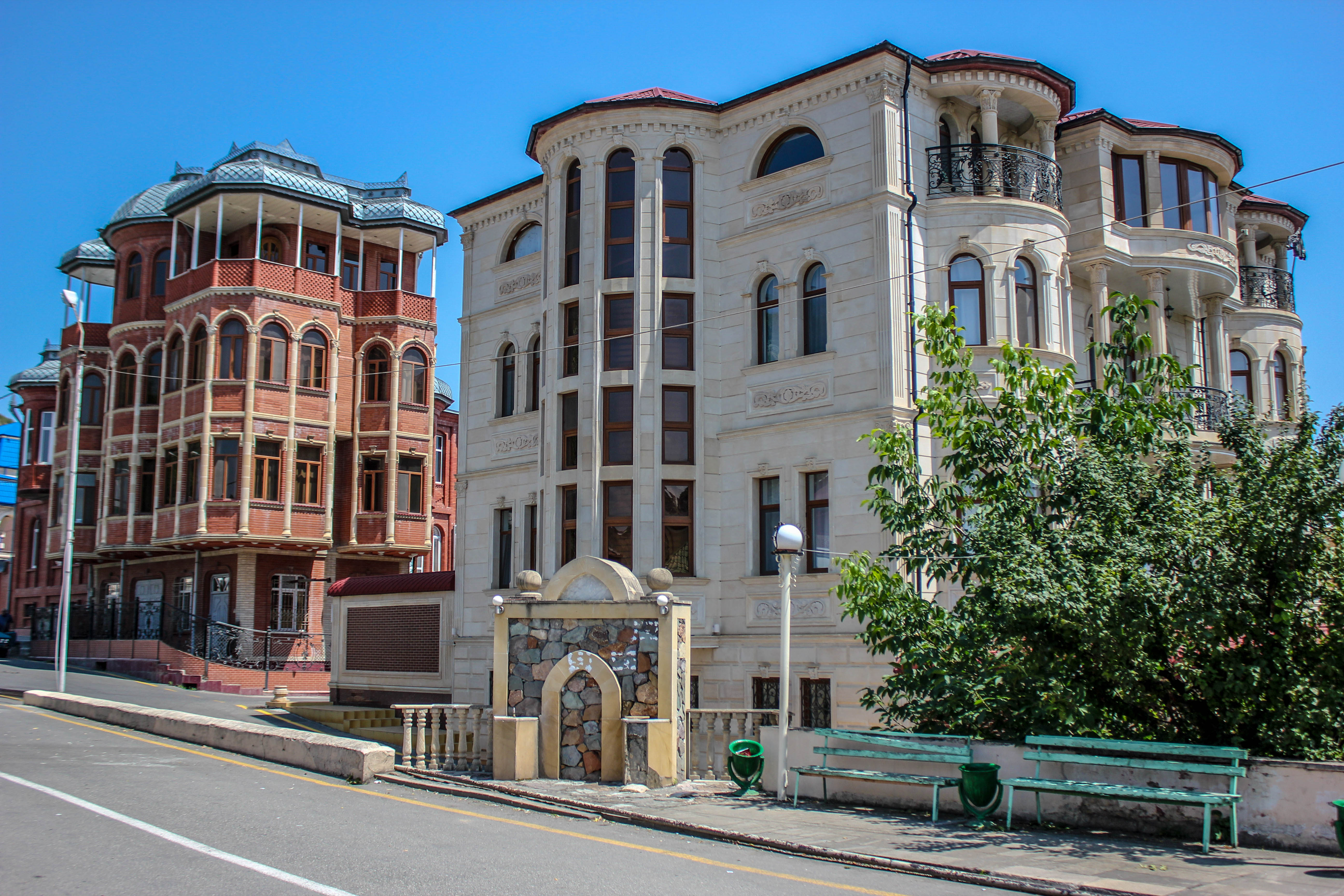
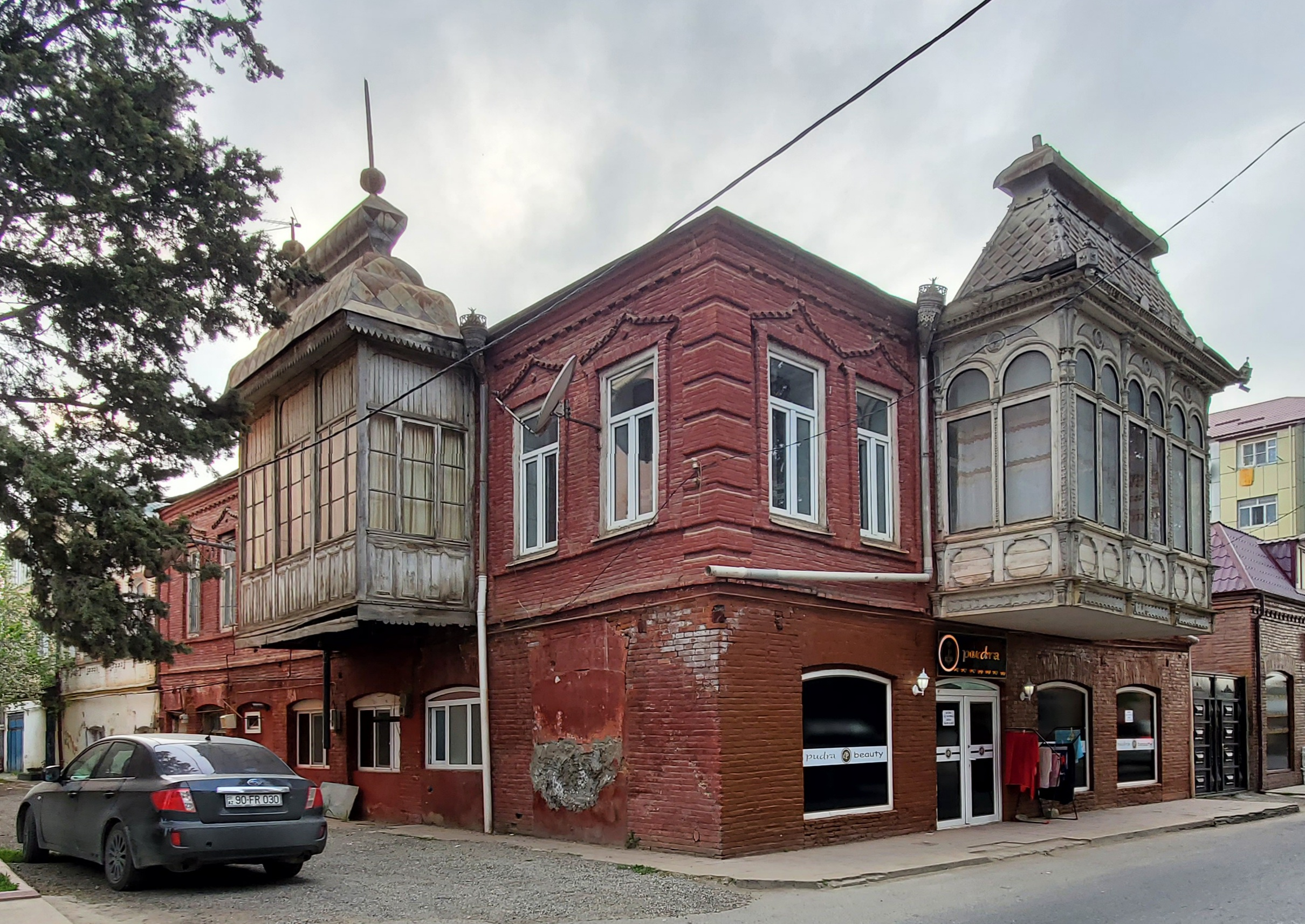
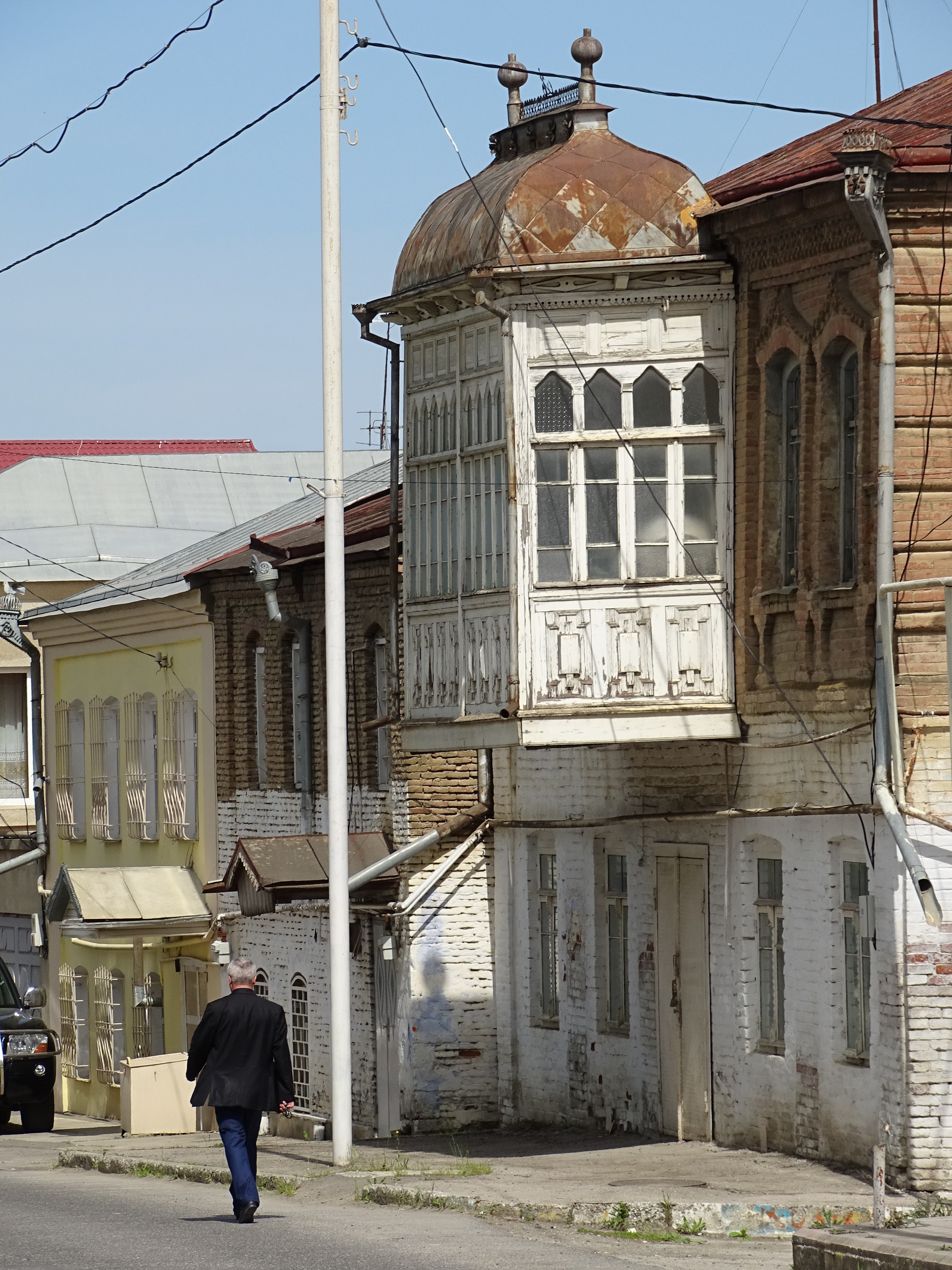

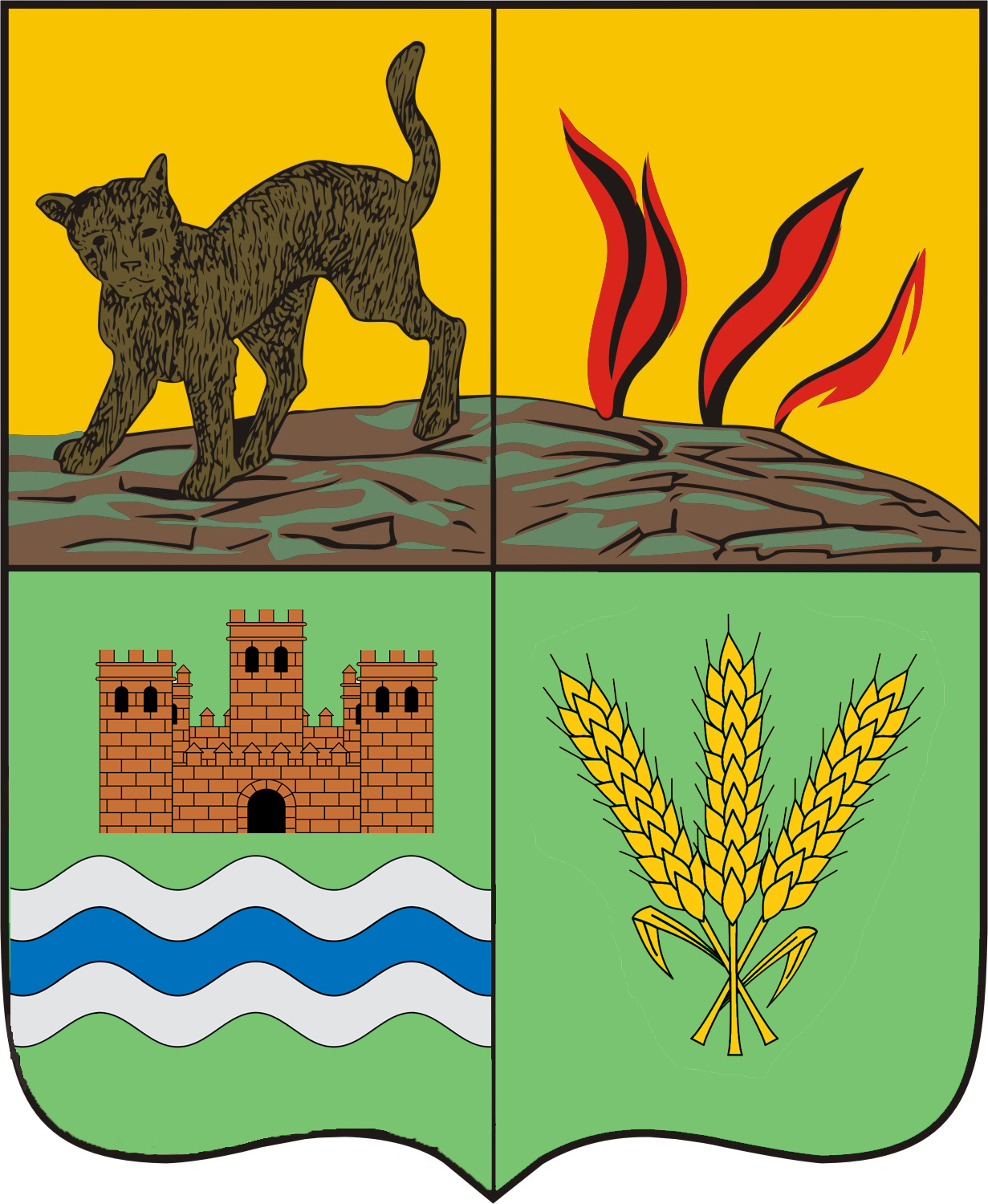
- Coat of arms

- Location within Azerbaijan
- Coordinates: 41°21′35″N 48°30′45″E
- Country: Azerbaijan
- District: Quba
- Region: Europe
- Elevation: 600 m (2,000 ft)

Population (2023)
  - Total: 47,200
- Time zone: UTC+4 (AZT)
- Area code: +994 169

Quba (Azerbaijani pronunciation: [guba]) is a city and the administrative centre of the Quba District of Azerbaijan. The city lies on the northeastern slopes of Shahdag mountain, at an altitude of 600 metres (2,000 ft) above sea level, on the right bank of the Kudyal River. In 2023, the city's population was 47,200. It is 168 km from the capital of Azerbaijan, Baku.

== History ==
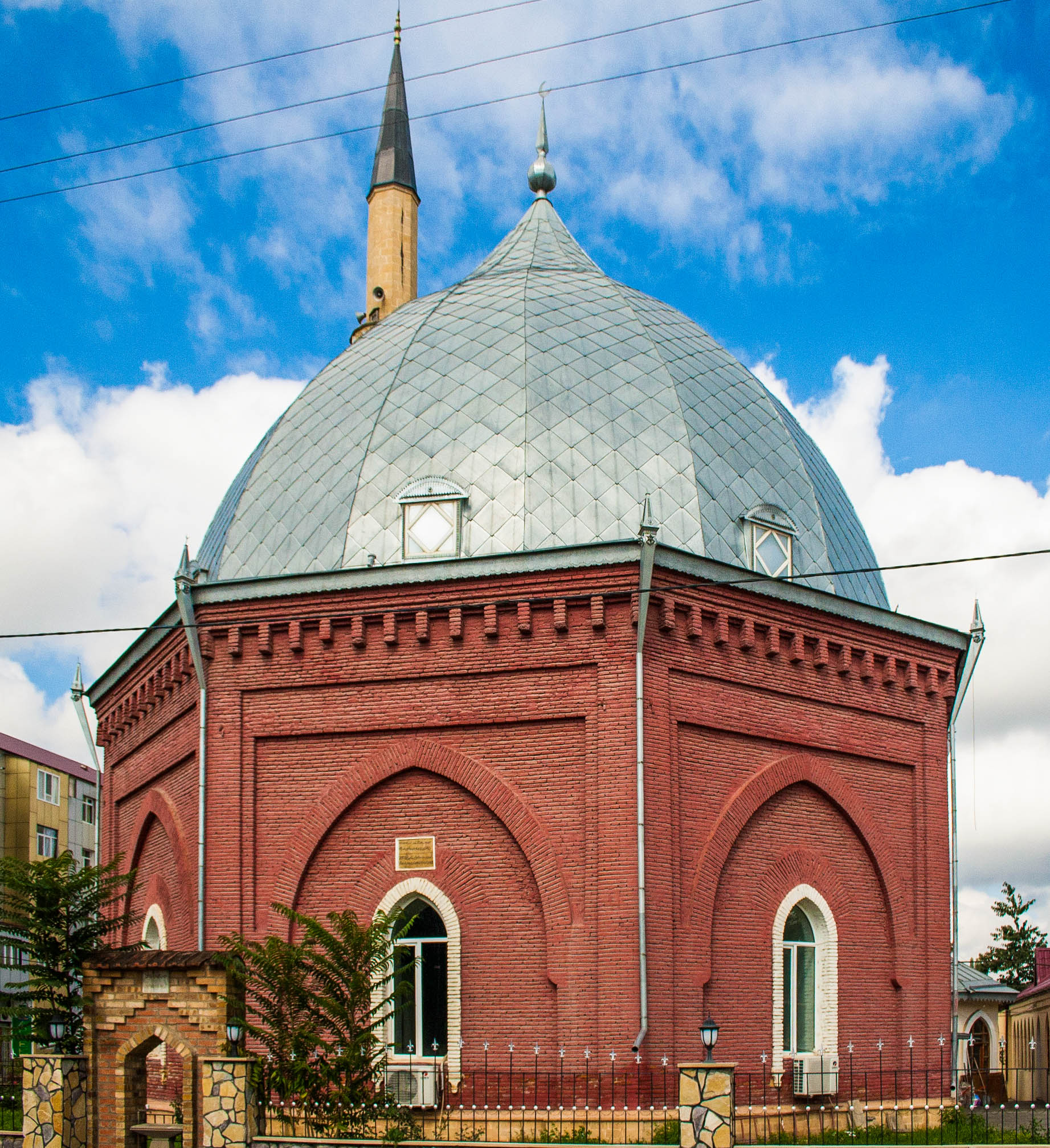

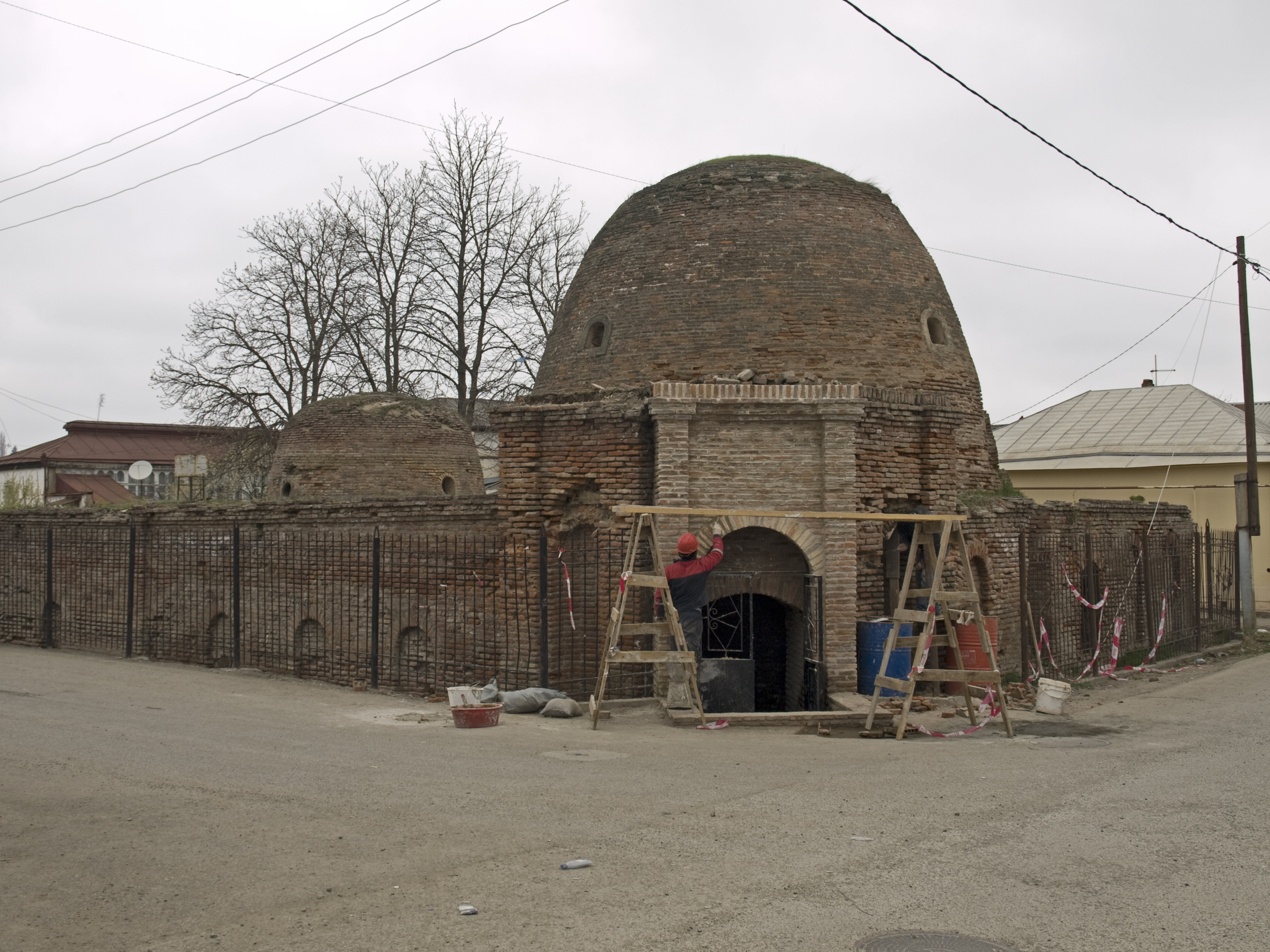
The Hamam

Quba was mentioned in works of various European geographers, in ancient Arabic and Albanian sources. The castle built by the ruler Anushiravan in the 11th century was called "Bade-Firuz Qubat", and in the Arabic sources of the 12th century Quba was mentioned as "Cuba". In the 13th century, in the Dictionary of Geographical names of Arabian scientist Hamabi, it was mentioned as Kubba, and in the sources of 16th century Quba was referred to as "Dome".

Guba (Quba) city originated from the riverside village of Gudial. In the mid-18th century, after moving his residence from Khudat, Hussain Ali became Quba's Khan (tribal Turkic Muslim ruler) and raised fortress walls around the city. He thereafter attempted to create a state separate from other Caucasian khanates. The position of the Quba khanate grew stronger during the reign of Fatali Khan (1758–1789), son of Hussain Ali Khan.

Nevertheless, Quba Khanate, like other Transcaucasian khanates, was ceded by Qajar Iran to the Russian Empire under the 1813 Treaty of Gulistan. After the rehabilitation, Quba was included in the Derbent province in 1840 and then in the Kuba Uyezd of the Baku Governorate in 1860.

Alexandre Dumas, Russian orientalist Berezin, the writer Bestuzhev-Marlinsky, the Norwegian scholar and adventurer Thor Heyerdahl visited Quba at the time.

Quba is a center of carpet weaving industry. The carpet "Golu Chichi" was woven in Quba in 1712; it has been exhibited at the Metropolitan Museum of Art in New York City.

== Climate ==
Quba has a humid subtropical climate (Cfa) according to the Köppen climate classification.

Climate data for Quba
Season	Autumn			Winter			Spring			Summer			Year
Month	Sep	Oct	Nov	Dec	Jan	Feb	Mar	Apr	May	Jun	Jul	Aug	Year
Average high °C	24	20	14	11	8	8	12	14	21	27	30	29	18
Daily mean °C	19	12	7	3	0	0	4	11	16	20	24	23	12
Average low °C	14	10	3	1	−3	−1	2	5	11	16	18	16	8
Average precipitation mm	49	59	43	36	29	31	37	45	47	29	26	29	460
Day length hrs	13	12	10	10	10	11	12	12	15	16	15	14	13
Average relative humidity (%)	69	77	72	74	78	82	77	69	66	60	58	61	70
Wind speed km/h	8	8	8	8	8	8	8	9	9	9	9	9	8
Mean monthly sunshine hours	230	199	160	149	153	157	184	194	238	258	270	259	2450

== Demographics ==
The officially registered population of Quba in 2010 was 38,150. The majority of the population is Azerbaijanis, while Tats and Lezgians constitute other minorities. The city's suburb of Qırmızı Qəsəbə (formerly in Russian: Красная Слобода, Krasnaya Sloboda; literally "Red Town") is home to the country's largest community of Mountain Jews and one of the largest Jewish populations in the former Soviet Union.

== Economy ==
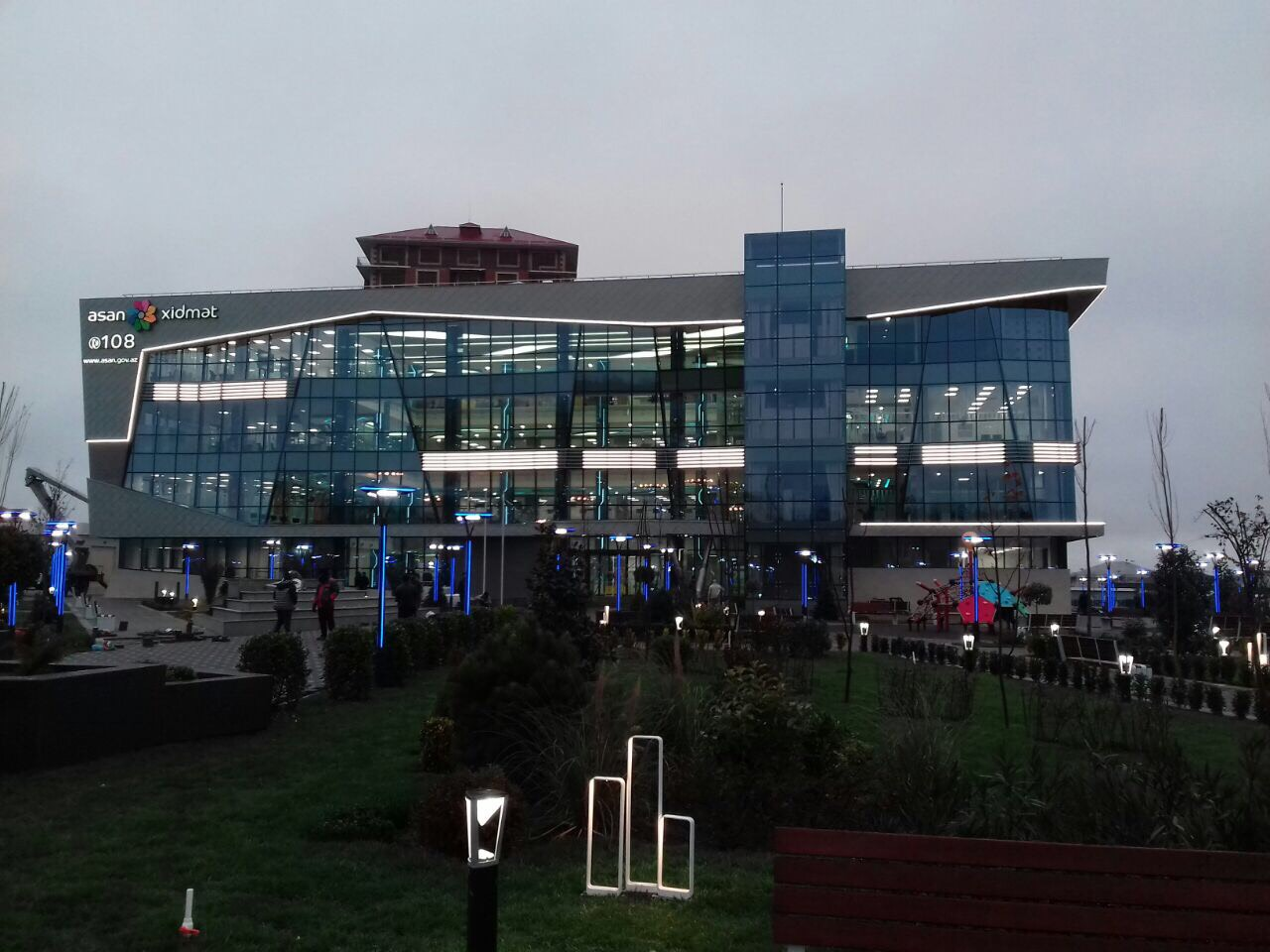
Quba ASAN service center

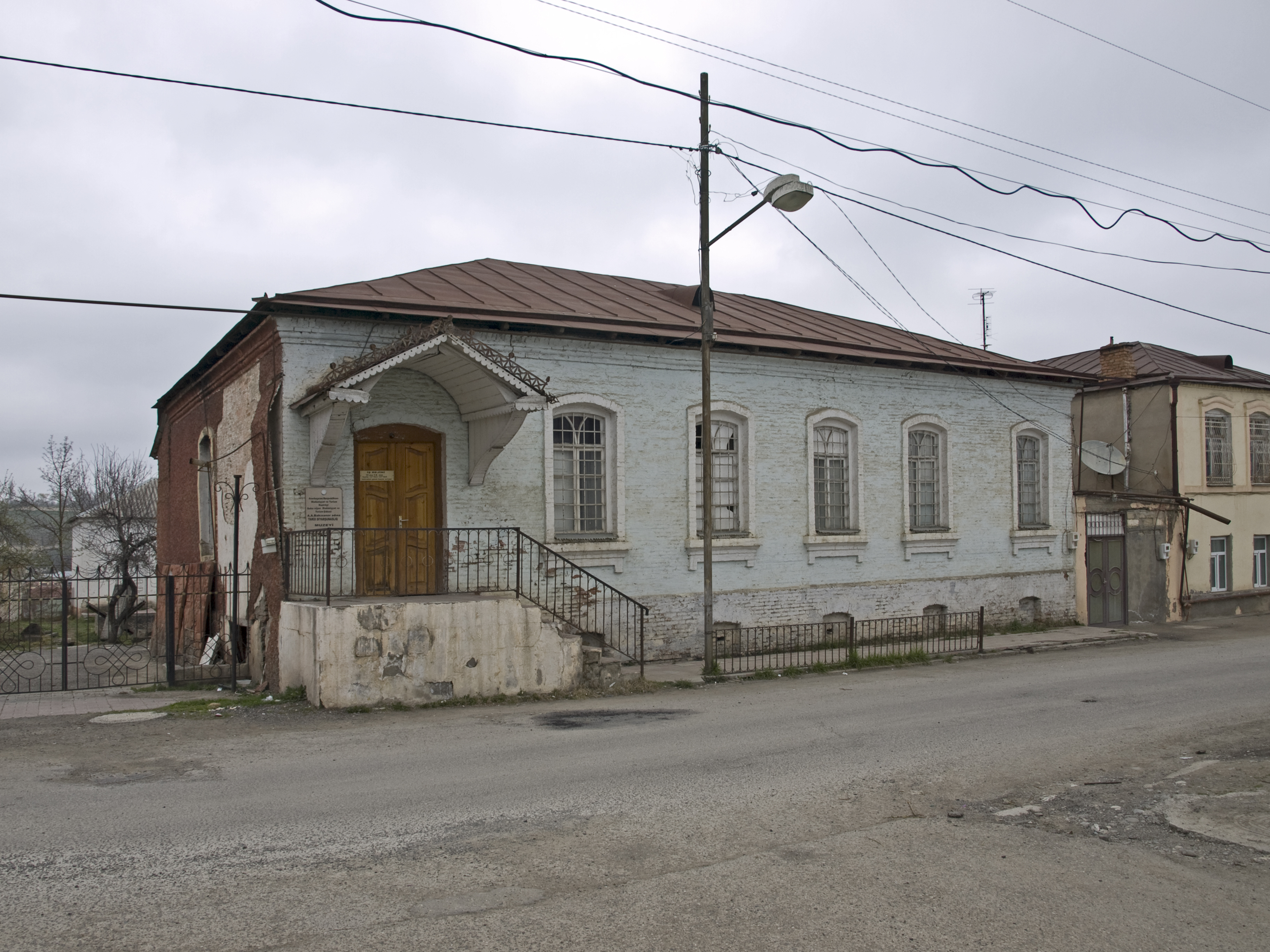
Bakikhanov house in Quba, currently a museum

Quba has enjoyed strong economic growth over the last decade, much of it spurred by tourism and the construction industry.

== Education ==
There are 155 educational facilities in Quba: 135 schools, 15 preschools, and 5 out-of-school child education training facilities. Out of 135 schools, 27 are primary schools, 43 are high schools that provide nine years of education, and 65 provide eleven years of education. In January 2017 these schools hosted 24,620 students.

== Culture ==
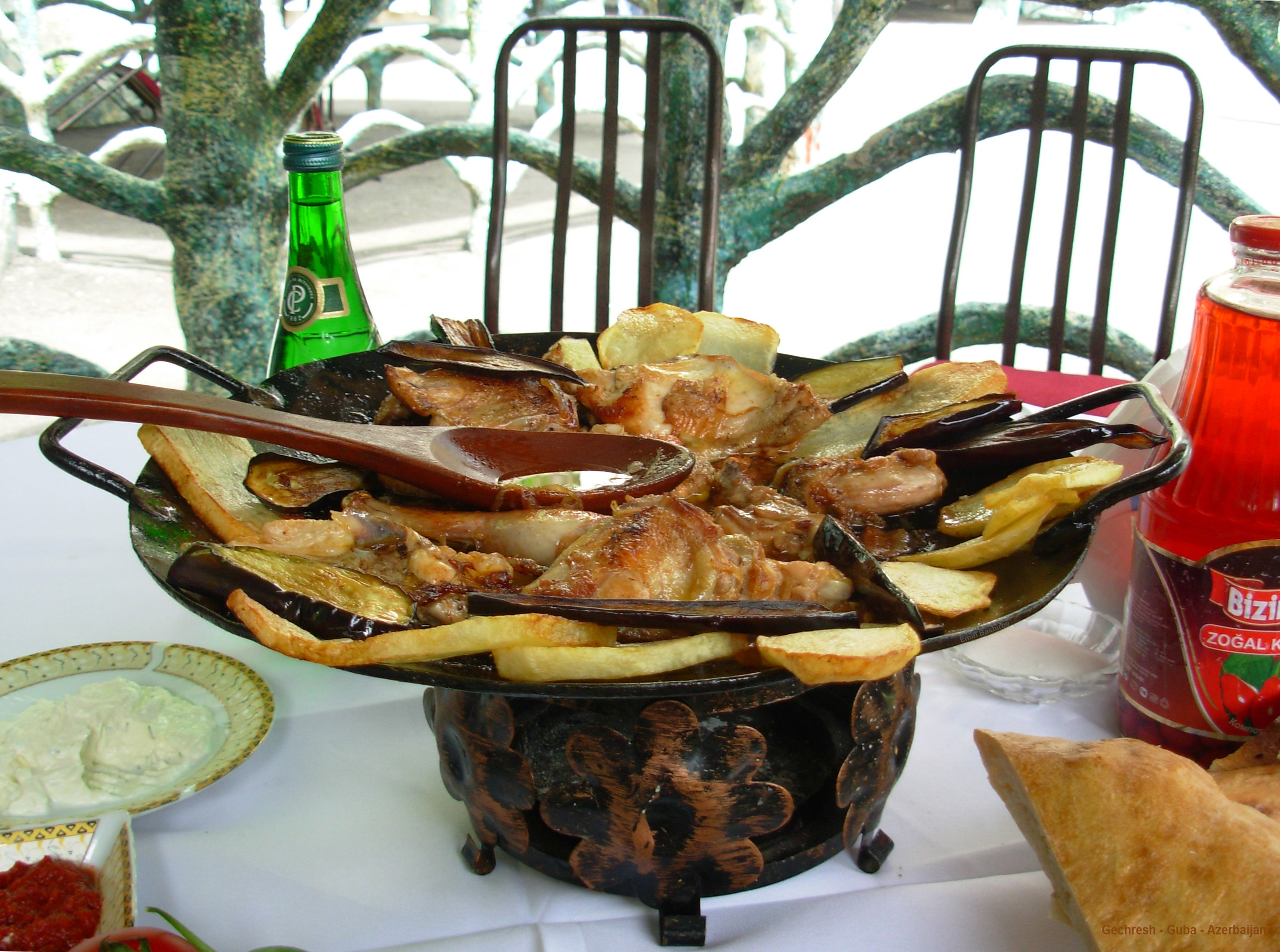
Sac is one of traditional meals in Quba's cuisine

Quba's cuisine has largely been affected by its multicultural history. Quba's signature cuisine includes Quba tıxması, spicy kebab, sac, Quba baklava and tandir kebab.

== Points of interest ==
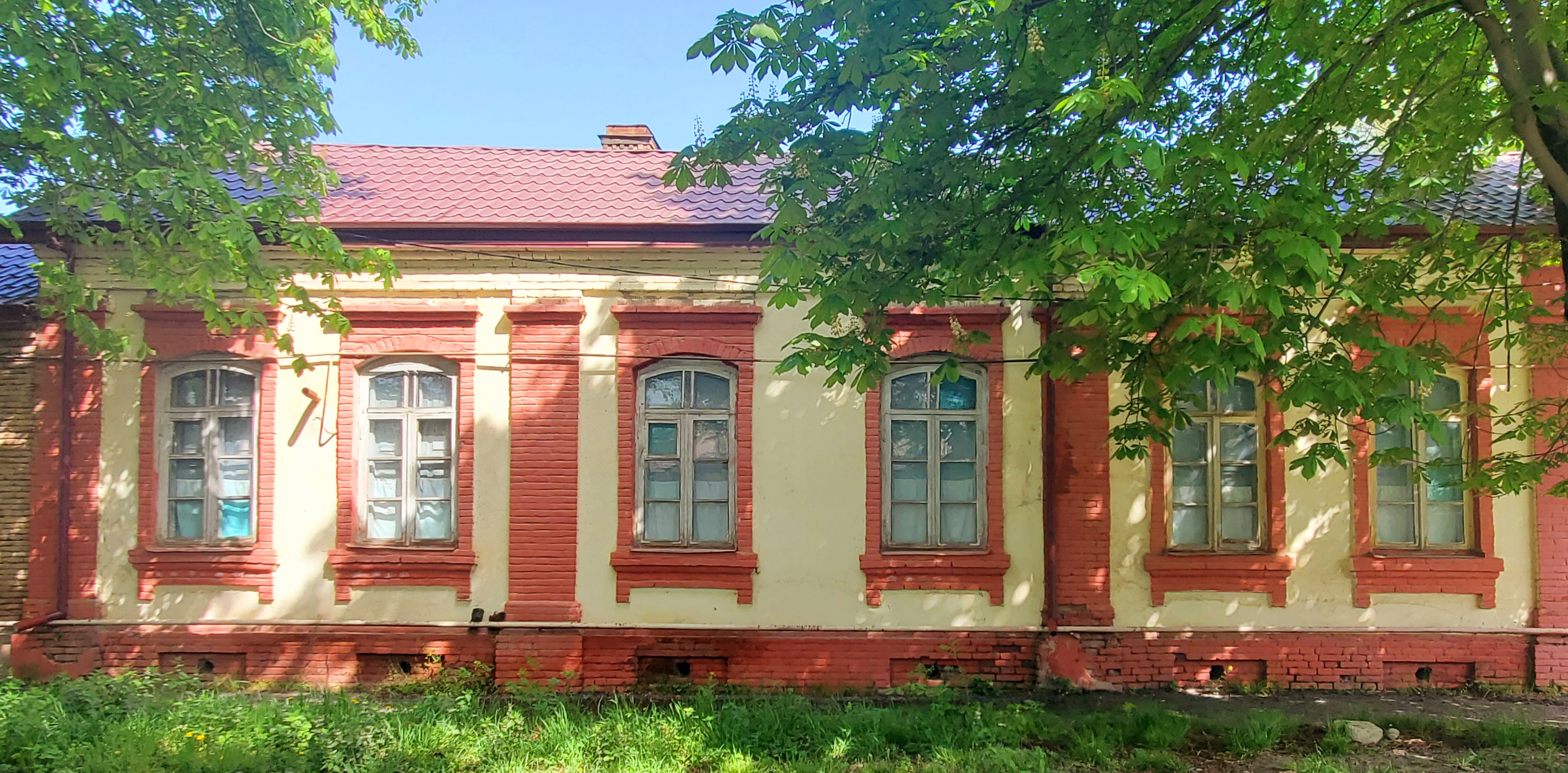

Juma Mosque
thi 19th century mosque, built of red brick, was erected in 1802. It is also called Jama. This mosque was constructed in typical Quba province style mosques. The brick for the mosque were made in the village of Igryg. In appearance it resembles a faceted cylinder, and it's shaped like a regular octagon. Inside of the mosque there is a hall crowned with a 16 m (52 ft) diameter dome.

Sakina-Khanum Mosque
built in 1854 by the widow of Abbasgulu Bakikhanov. It was erected in memory of her deceased husband. The mosque was built from red bricks and is similar to faceted cylinder. Each facet has a window in the form of a semicircular arch. The top of the facade is surrounded by an original eaves made from small bricks. From top this stately building is crowned with a big white metal dome in the shape of a multi-faceted helmet. The top of the dome is decorated by a graceful thin spike.

Chuhur hamam
a bathhouse. The hamam is unique in its beehive shaped dome made of brick. The building of the bathhouse was built from the red brick. Its large dome enabled it to maintain the right temperature and humidity inside the house. The house has a quadrangular shape and it has six rooms, two doors and six windows. Water was supplied from the well under the bath or from the city waterpipes. In his time, Alexandre Dumas bathed in this bathhouse, during his stay in Quba. 150 years later, his great-grandson visited these places. The bathhouse was the main resting place for the Quba people and it was used until 1985. The Chuhur hamam is no longer operational.

Museum of Abbasgulu Bakikhanov
a museum of Local History named after Abbasgulu Bakikhanov. It was founded in 1943 in Quba. The museum was opened in the building, located along Ardabil Street, in which Bakikhanov himself lived at the time. The building dates back to the 19th century. There are over 10,000 exhibits on the museum territory which is 7,990 sq ft (742 m^{2}) in total. More than 3,000 people visit this museum every year.

Portal Frame Bridge
the only bridge that has survived to this day; also called the Kudyalchay Bridge. It is one of the seven bridges that existed in the Quba district in the 17th to 19th centuries. This bridge was built in 1894 on the draft of Alexander III. 14 of its spans with a total length of 275 m (902 ft) and a width of 8 m (26 ft) are made of burnt bricks. This design allows the bridge to remain intact even during heavy mudflows and floods. The bridge has recently been restored and is protected by the state as an architectural monument. This is the only bridge with such structure in Azerbaijan.

Nizami Park
said to be named after Persian poet Nizami Ganjavi, it was built by captured Germans in 1946. A statue of the poet is erected in the park. There are bas-reliefs, depicting scenes from the works of Nizami around the monument along the avenues.

Olympic complex
located 120 km (75 mi) from Baku, was opened on October 11, 2003. The area of this recreational and sports center is 16 hectares. There are facilities for the development of football, mini-football, basketball and volleyball. There are two-story cottages, spacious apartments, as well as a conference hall with a capacity of 200 people on the territory of the complex; the largest of five halls in this complex is designed for 2,000 spectators. One of the two small training halls is equipped with simulators, and the other with a boxing ring. Wrestlers can use the auxiliary room. The football field, which accommodates 5,100 spectators, is equipped with all the amenities that meet the requirements of this sport. The 50-meter pool is suitable for both training and competition. There are 3 stands, accommodating 1010 people.

Guba Genocide Memorial
opened in 2013 on the site of a mass grave discovered in April 2007. the memorial was created by the Heydar Aliyev Foundation in remembrance of the victims killed in 1918 during what is known as March Days.

== Twin cities ==
Quba is twinned with the following cities:

- Erzin, Turkey, since 2011
- Kant, Kyrgyzstan, since 2016
- Ma'alot-Tarshiha, Israel, since 2019

== Notable locals ==
- Kamal Mamedbekov (20 March 1924 – 2 September 1997), Azerbaijani and Soviet scientist, academician of the International Academy of Architecture of the Eastern Countries, honored architect of Azerbaijan SSR, PhD in theory and history of architecture and restoration of architectural monuments.
- Leyla Mamedbekova (12 May 1922 – 23 May 2006), Azerbaijani and Soviet scientist, pathologist, honored scientist of Azerbaijan SSR, professor. She was the first female professor in Azerbaijan in the field of pathology, the first female forensic medical expert, and the first female chief pathologist of Azerbaijan.
- Mir Jafar Baghirov (5 September 1895 – 26 May 1956), politician, the communist leader of the Azerbaijani SSR.
- Farhad Veliyev (1 November 1980), footballer.
- Zulfiyya Khanbabayeva (16 October 1967), Azerbaijani singer and performer.

== Gallery ==
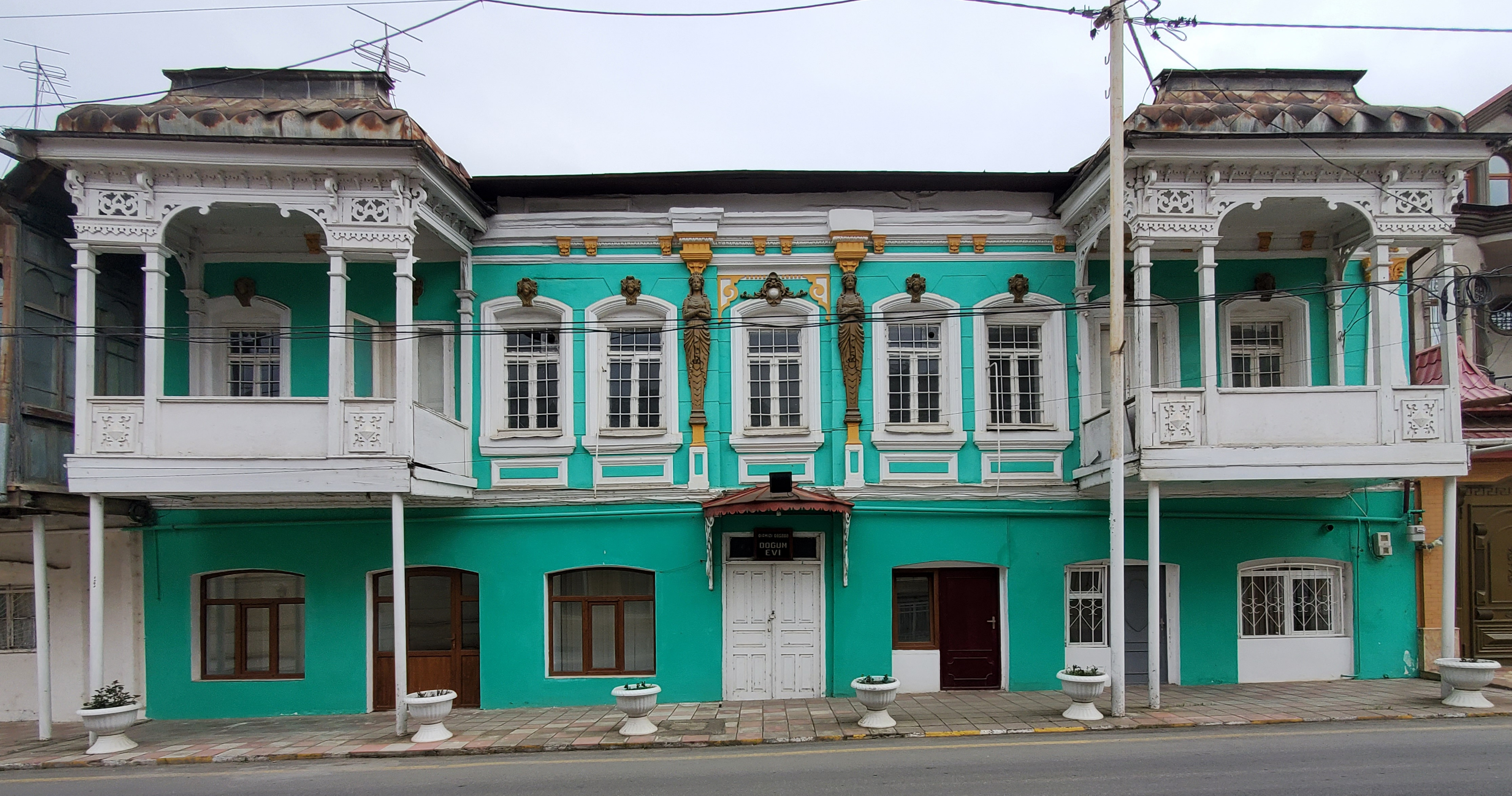

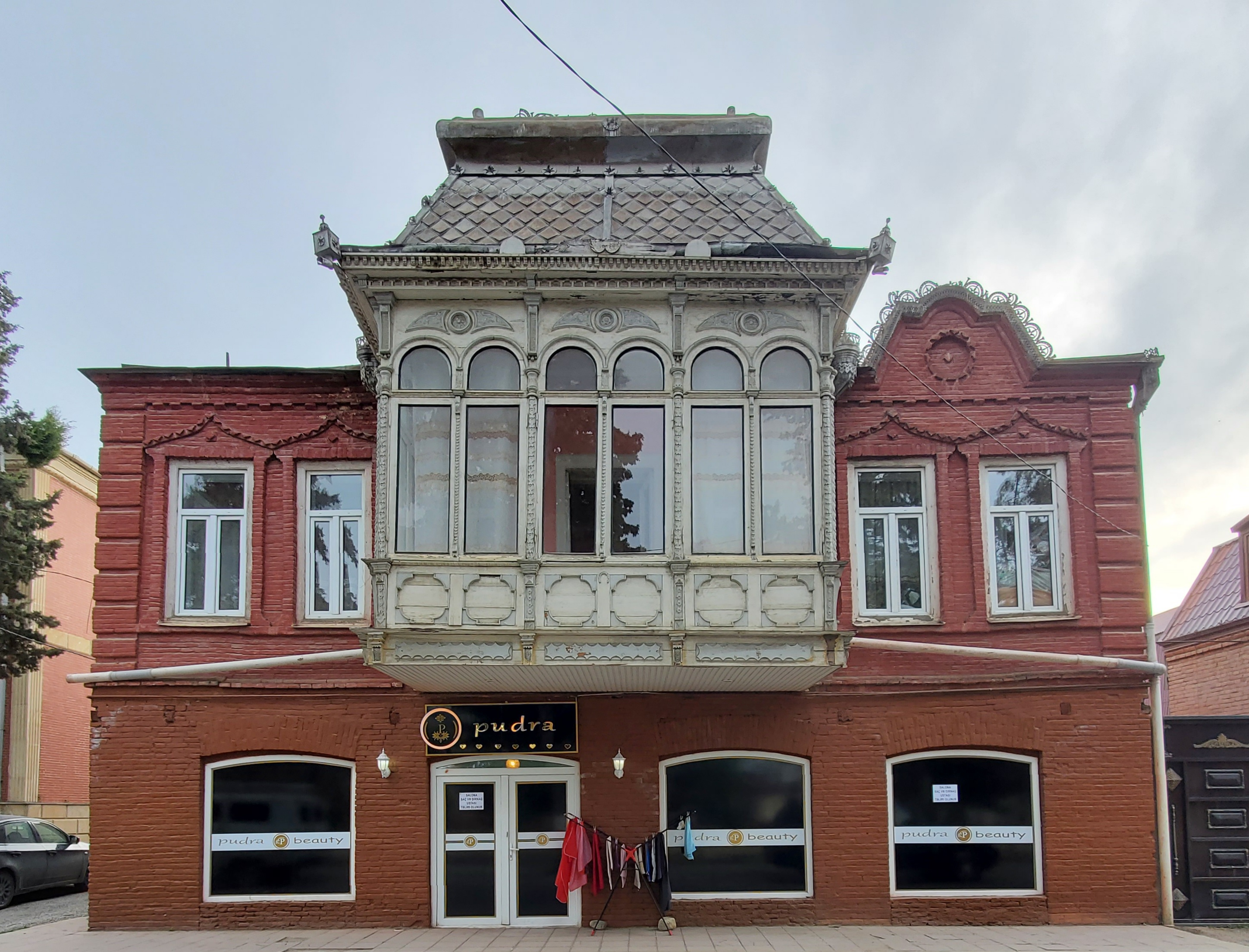

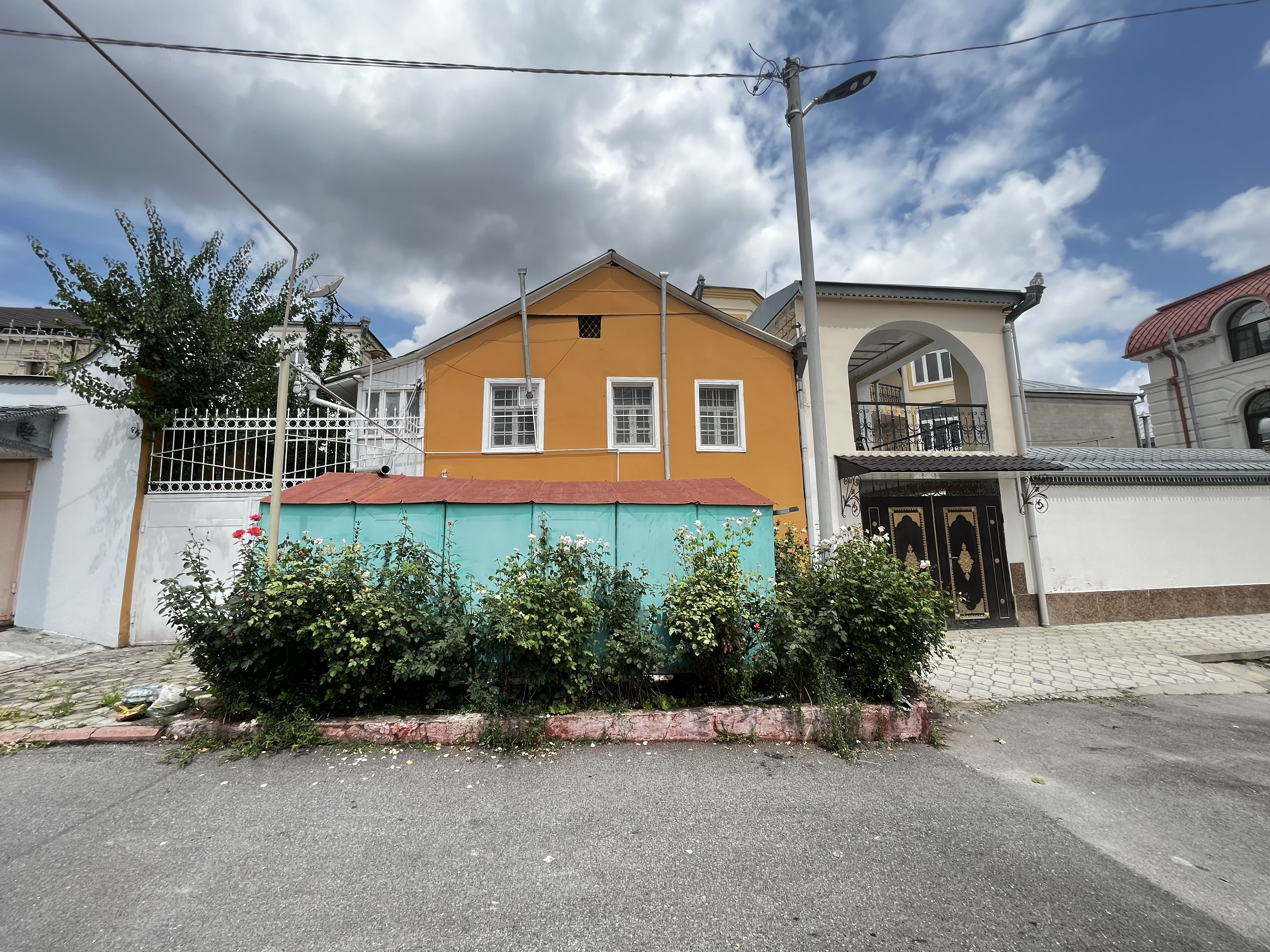
House belonging to Simonov Zahar and his children.

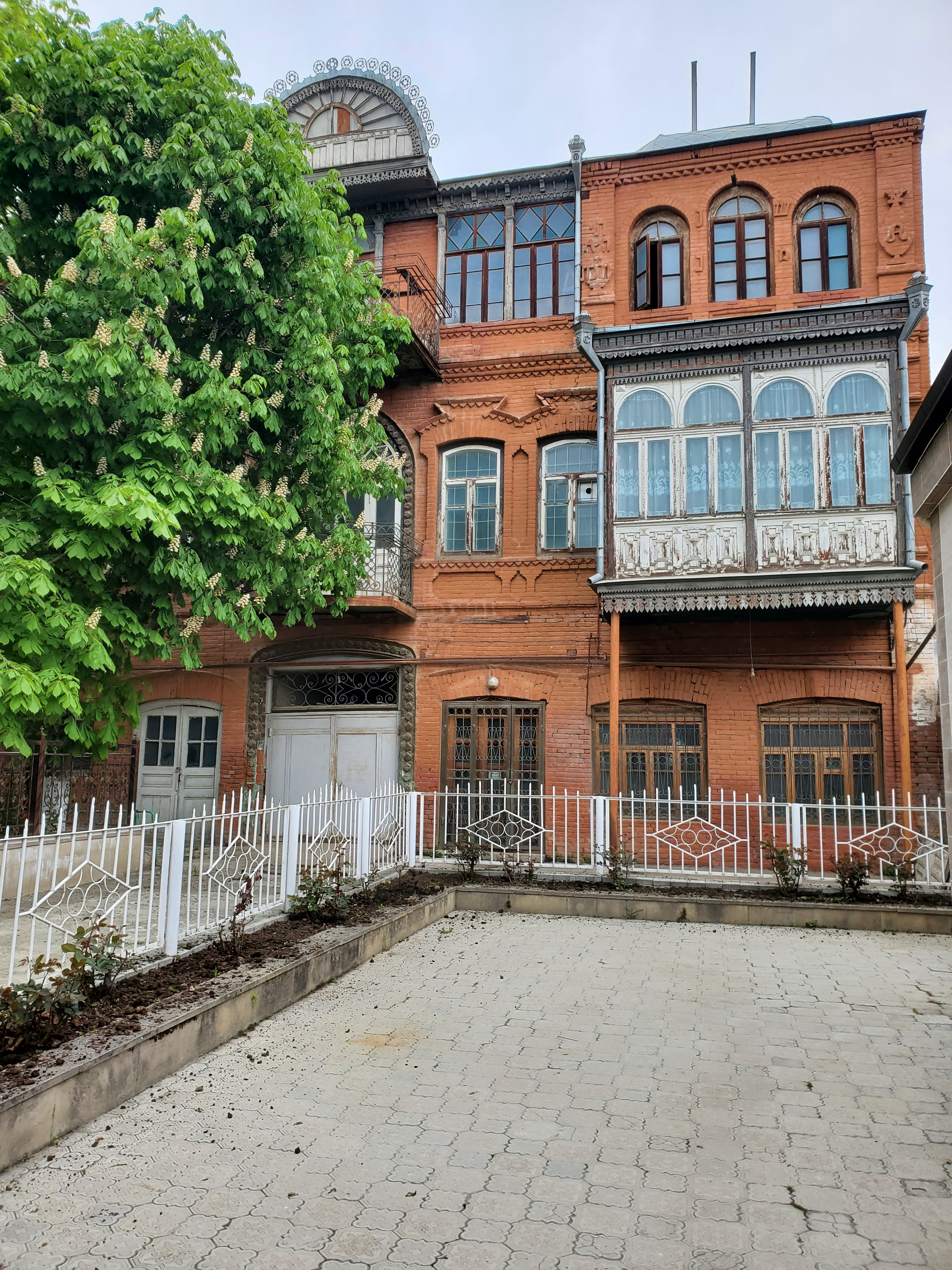

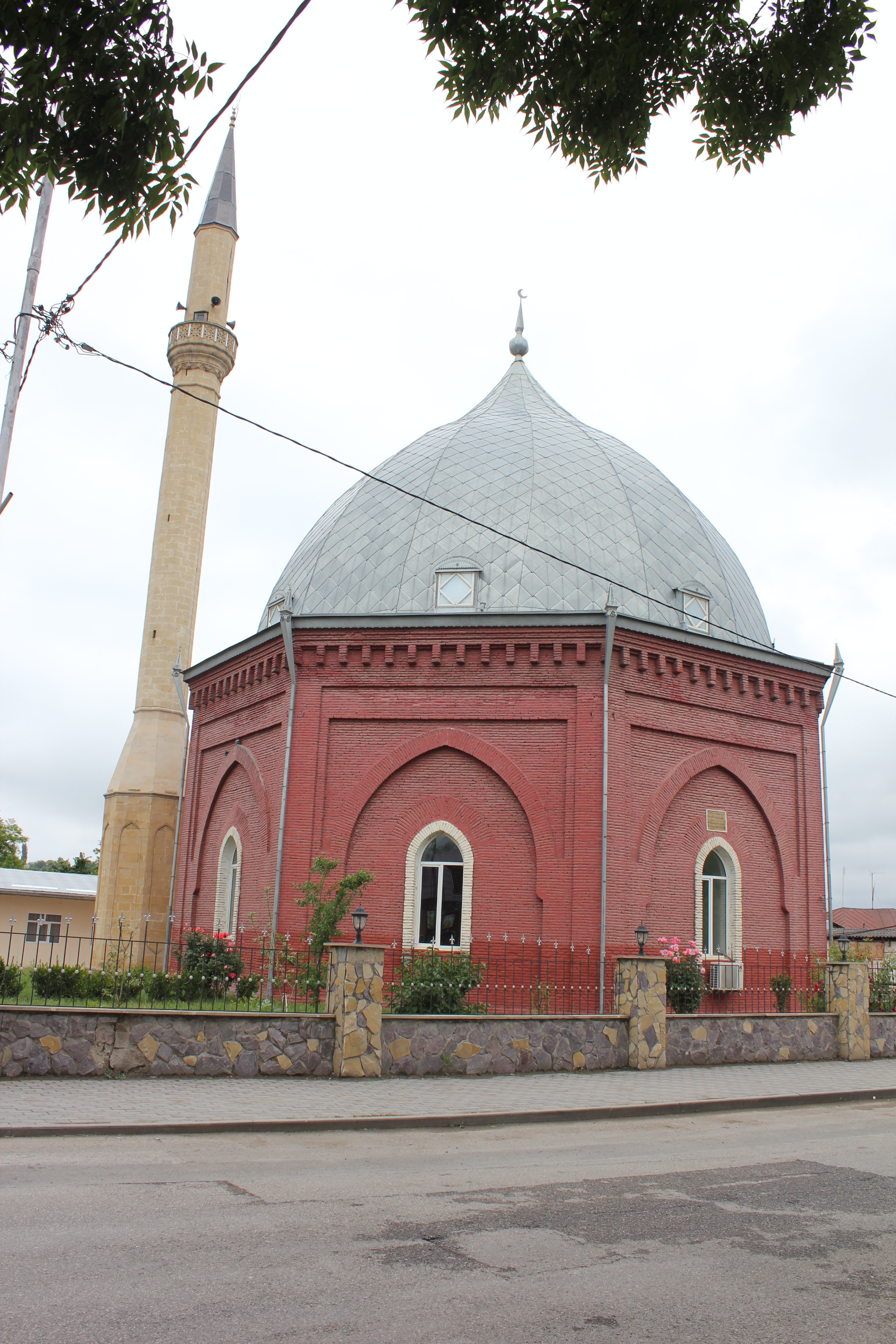

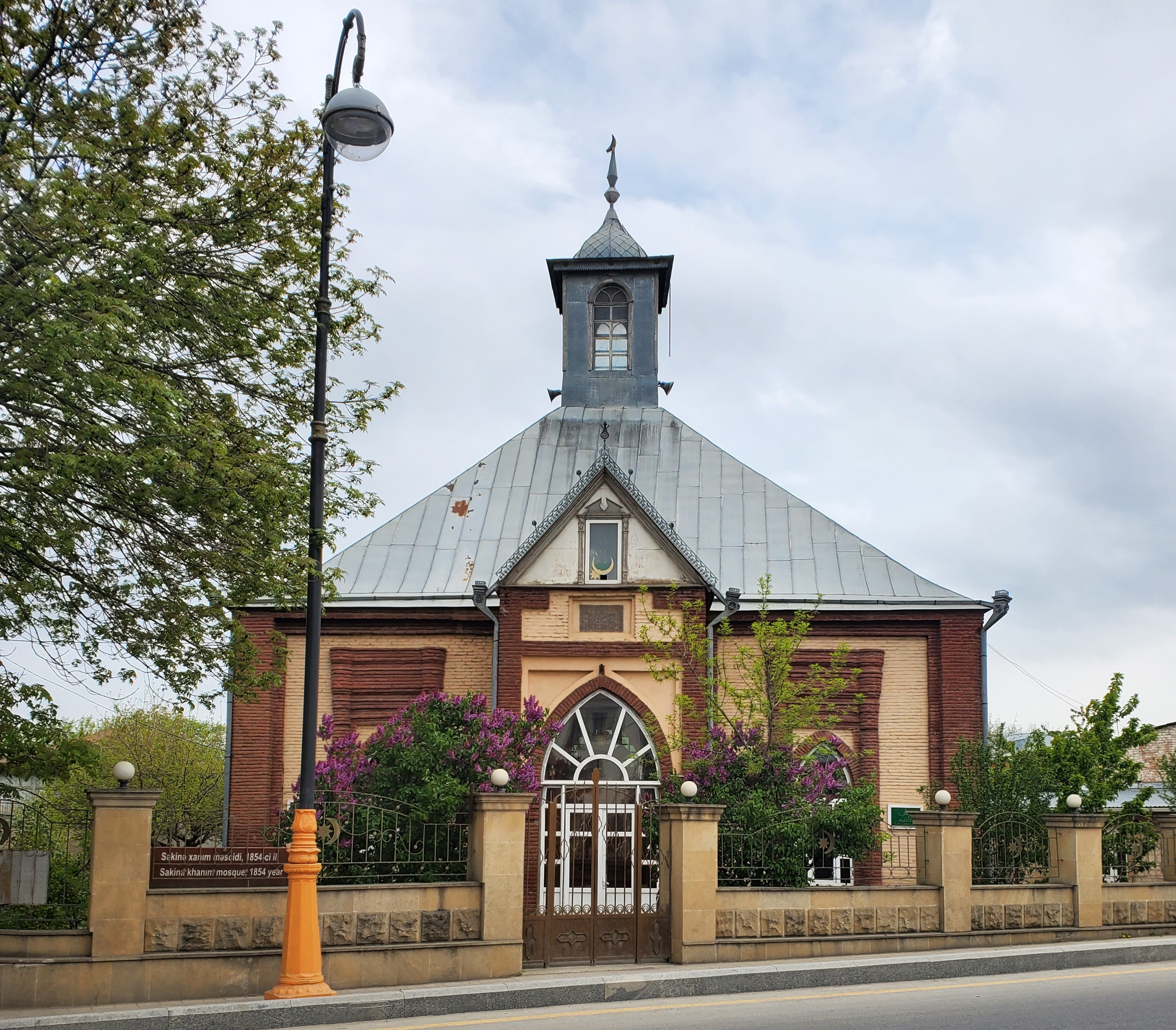

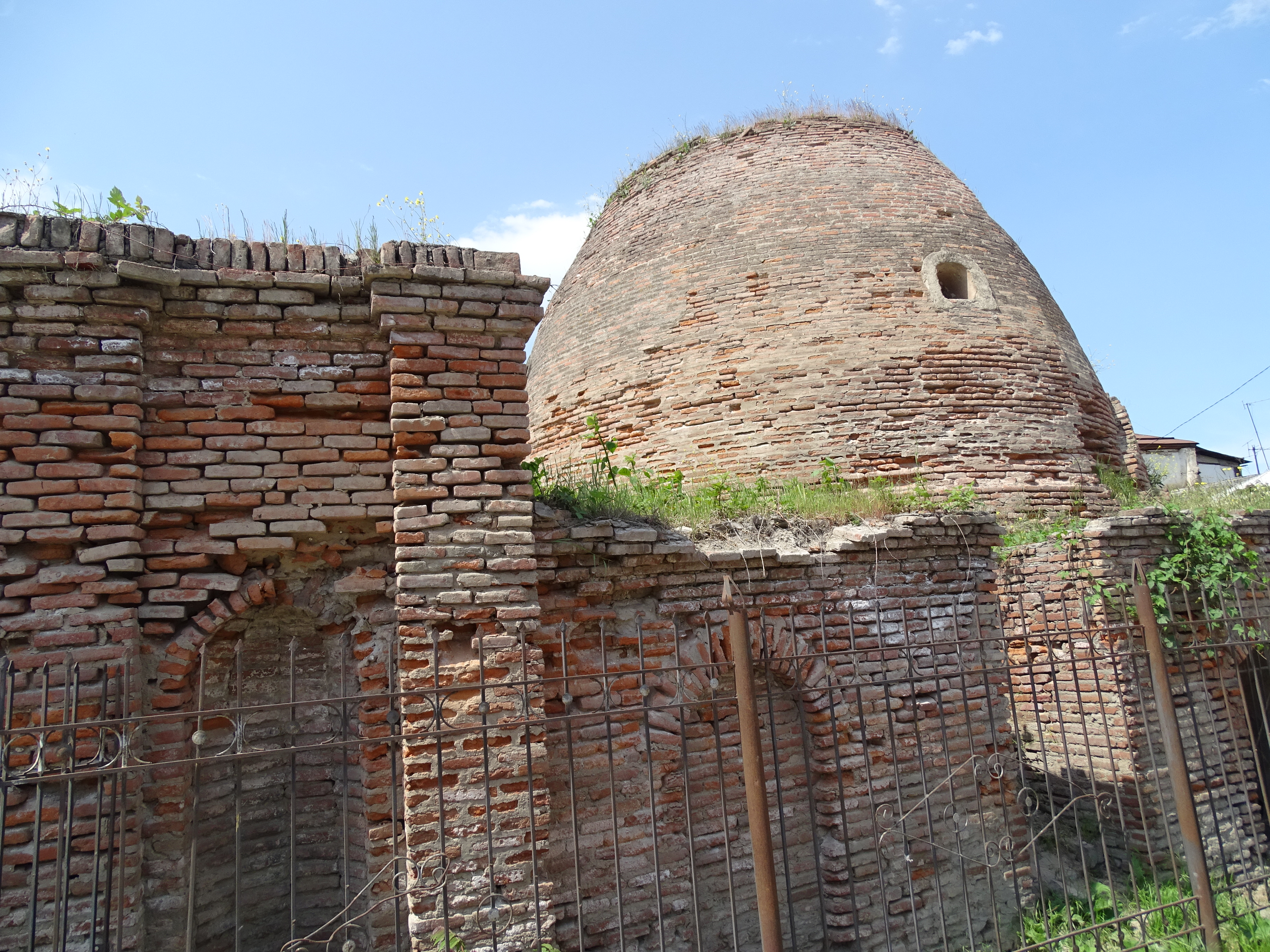

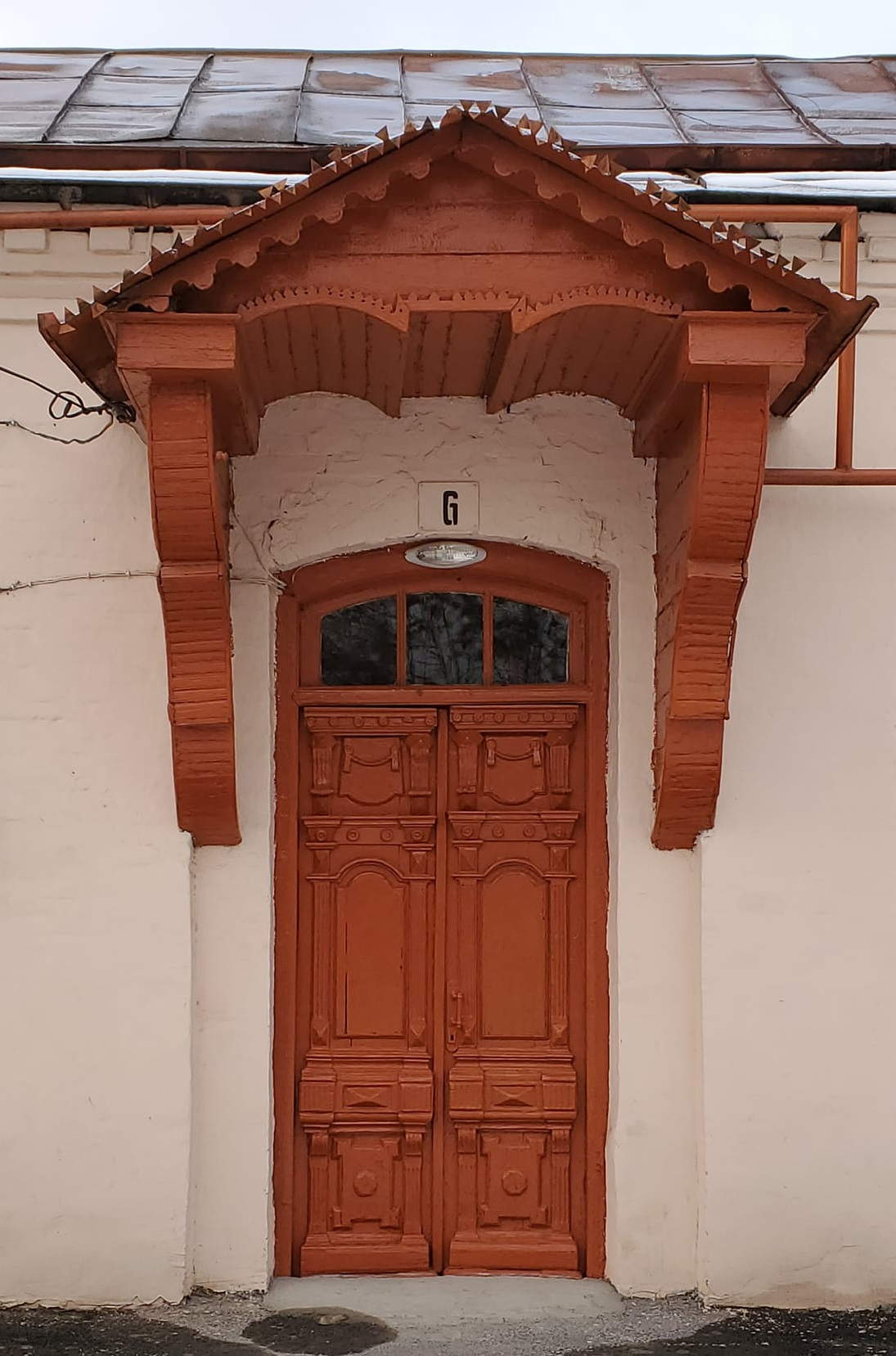

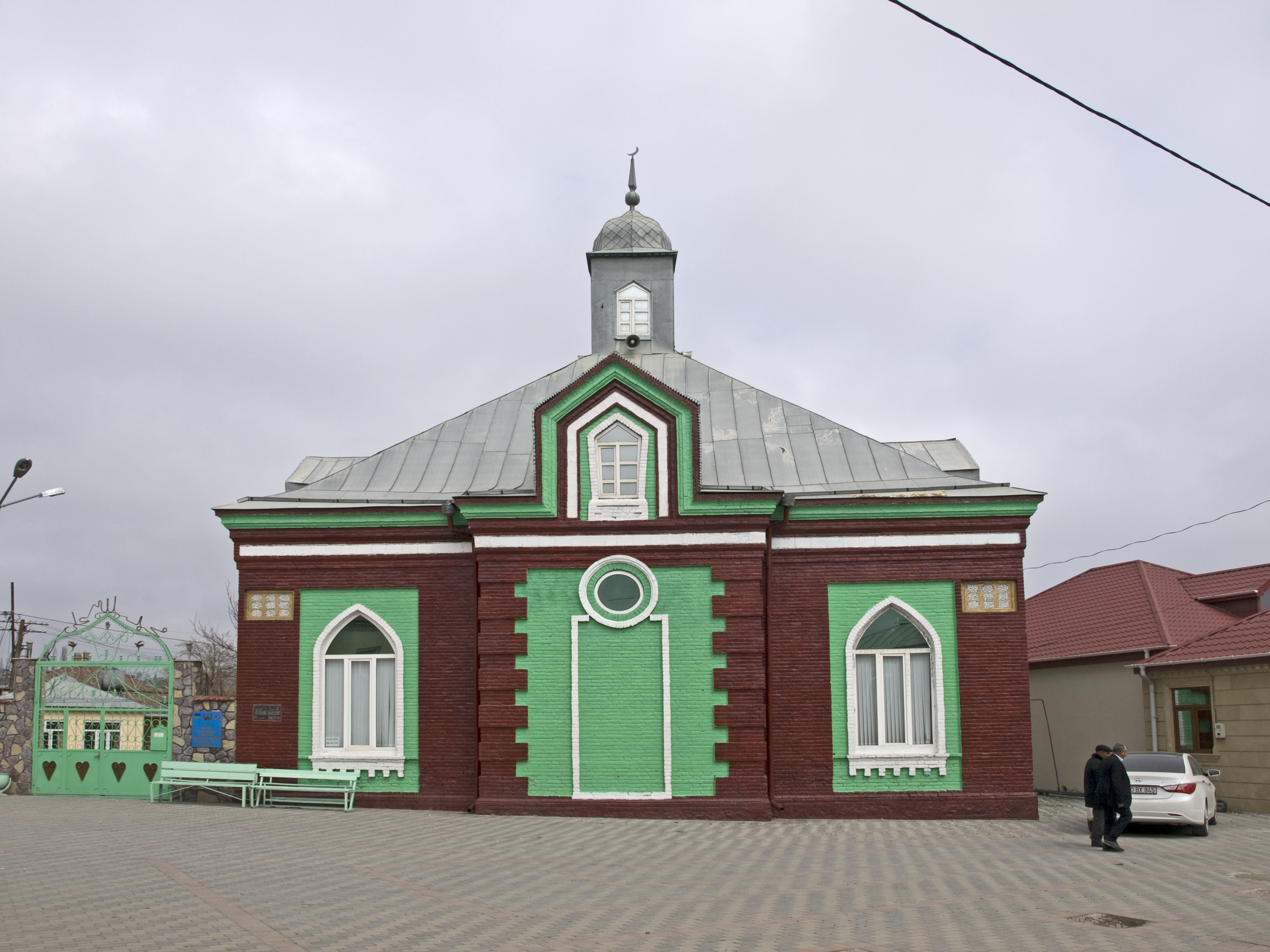

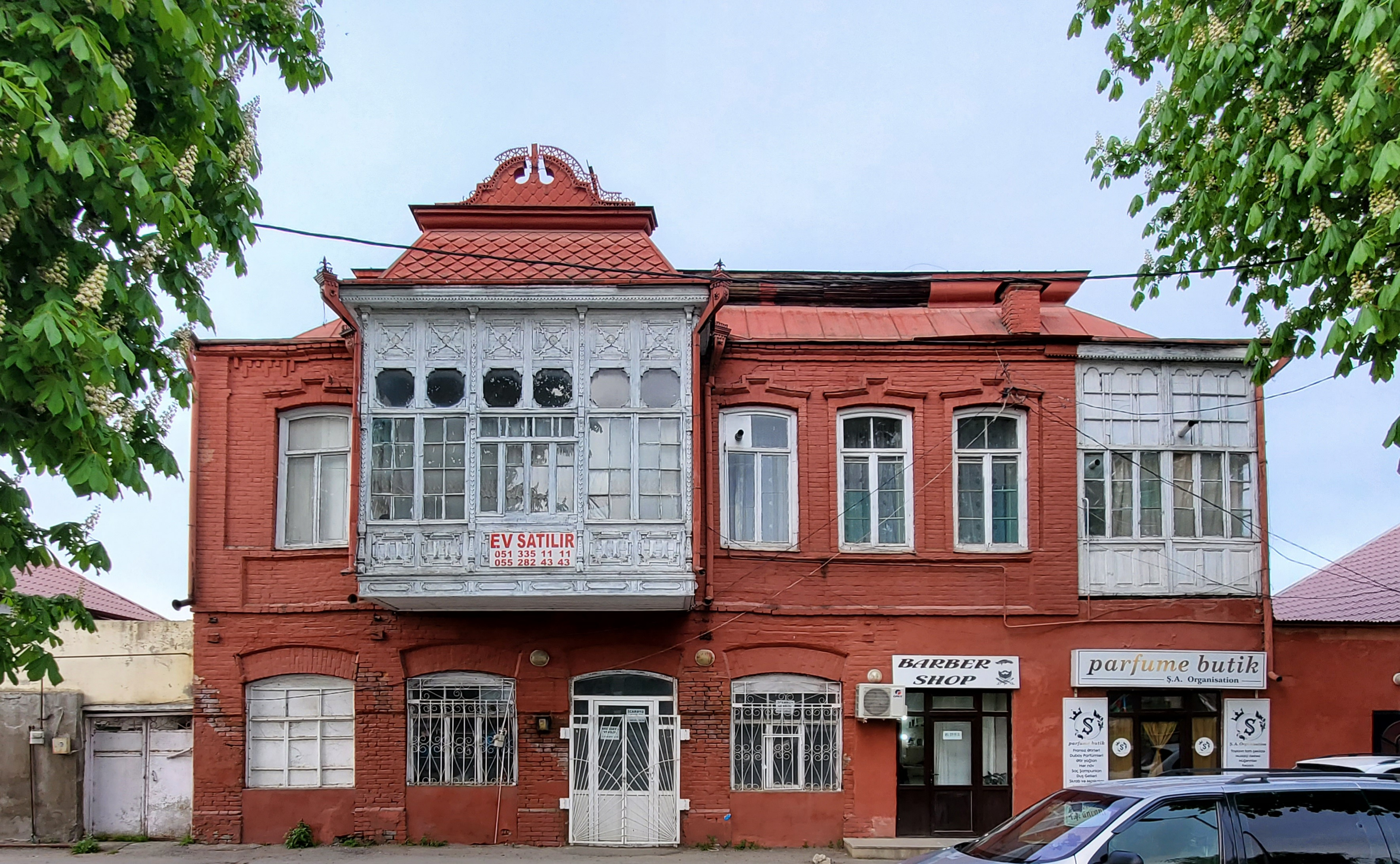

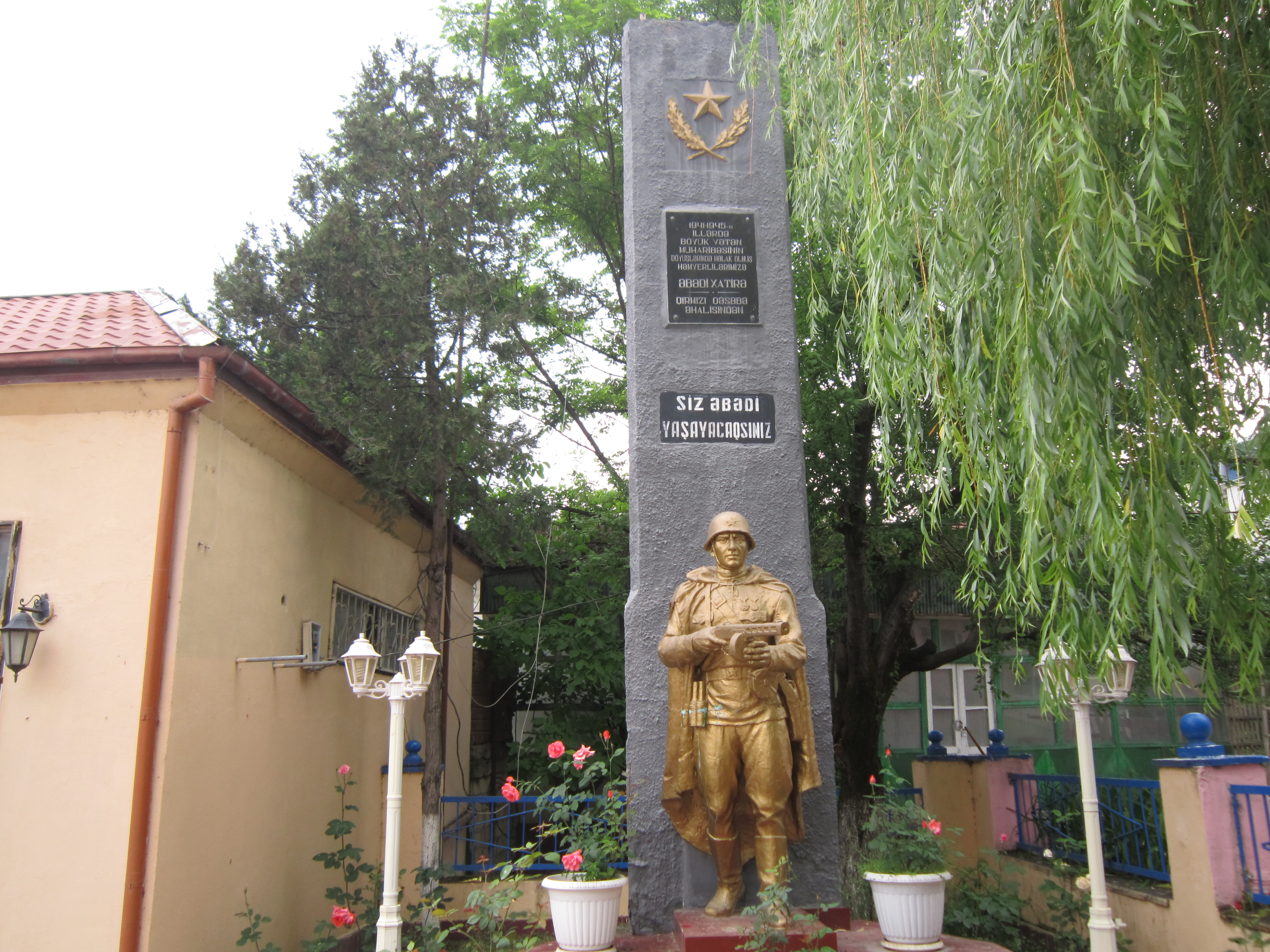

== See also ==
- Guba mass grave
- Subaba tomb
- Qırmızı Qəsəbə - Red Town
