= Matale mass grave =

Matale mass grave is the mass burial of people suspected to have been killed extrajudicially during the second JVP uprising during counterinsurgency operations by the Sri Lankan Army. Sri Lankan forensic archaeologist led by Raj Somadeva who examined the site said that it was not due to epidemic or any natural causes and a parallel investigation done by a Judicial Medical Officer Ajith Jayasena said that it was not a regular burial site and both concluded that remains belonged to the period 1986–1990.

== Background ==
Janatha Vimukthi Peramuna staged an armed uprising after the signing of the Indo-Sri Lankan Accord and the presence of the IPKF in Sri Lanka which was unpopular in Sri Lanka. This uprising was put down brutally by the government in which thousands of youths were killed. The remains of over 150 people was discovered when a new building was being built in the Matale Base Hospital. Matale was one of the areas JVP insurgency was very active. Gotabhaya Rajapaksa was the commanding officer of the Sri Lankan Army in Matale from May 1989 and left for USA in Jan 1990 by which the insurgency was crushed.

== Investigation ==
Sri Lankan Government has ordered a probe by a presidential commission but it has been questioned whether the commission will achieve anything as previous commissions have achieved little and some of those who held responsible positions in Matale then are in influential positions including the then Military Coordinating Officer of Matale.

== See also ==
- Chemmani mass grave
- Duraiappa stadium mass grave
- Mirusuvil mass grave
- Sooriyakanda mass grave
