= Mannar mass graves =

Mannar mass graves refers to the discovery of several mass graves in Mannar, northwestern Sri Lanka, starting in 2013 when 11 skeletons were unearthed. In 2018, another mass grave was discovered in the Tamil-dominated town and 346 skeletons were unearthed, 29 being those of children, making it the largest mass grave in the country. There has been controversy over the dates of this mass grave, with the lead archeologist and other sources challenging a carbon dating suggesting the remains were over 500 years old; they contended the artifacts recovered from the site suggested the remains were within 30 years old. The discovery received attention in relation to those who had gone missing during the Sri Lankan civil war.

== Overview ==
The press and media carried the news in headlines following the excavation conducted by the Sri Lankan authorities in Mannar which led to the discovery of a mass grave in 2013.

According to the police, the site was allegedly used for mass burial of civilians and soldiers alike killed by the Tamil rebels during the war.

Parts of Mannar were under the control of the rebels for almost 30 long years. The long battle ended in May 2009 after the government forces vanquished the Tamil rebels. The discovery of the Mannar grave led to further investigation in Matale, central Sri Lanka, which bore 150 human skeletons.

The Director General of Archaeological Department of Sri Lanka whom had been instructed by the Mannar Magistrate to investigate and report on the "Mass Grave", announced on 8 April 2014, that the site is a normal burial ground which had been used since the 1930's. He had explained how it was not a mass grave, but proposed further investigations.

Carbon dating of the skeletons tested from the mass grave belonged to an era from 1499 to 1719 AD. The carbon testing was carried out by the Beta Analytic Institute of Florida, USA. The Mannar magistrate has ordered that this report be made public.

== See also ==
- Chemmani mass graves investigation
- Duraiappa stadium mass grave
- Sooriyakanda mass grave
