= Titus Quinctius Atta =

Roman comedy writer

Titus Quinctius Atta (died 77 BC) was a Roman comedy writer, and, like Titinius and Afranius, was distinguished as a writer of fabulae togatae, national comedies.

== Works ==
He had the reputation of being a vivid delineator of character, especially female. He also seems to have published a collection of epigrams. The scanty fragments contain many archaisms, but are lively in style. According to Horace (Epistles, ii 1. 79), the plays of Atta were still put on the stage in his lifetime.

== Surviving titles and fragments ==
The titles (and associated fragments) of twelve of Atta's plays survive.

- Aedilicia
- Aquae Caldae
- Conciliatrix (Matchmaker)
- Gratulatio
- Lucubratio
- Materterae (Maternal Aunts)
- Megalensia (The Megalensia Festival)
- Nurus (Daughter-in-Law)
- Satura
- Socrus (Mother-in-Law)
- Supplicatio
- Tiro Proficiscens (Tiro Setting Forth)

== Further literature ==
- Gesine Manuwald 2011, Roman Republican Theater (Cambridge 2011), p. 266–267
