= Chemmani mass graves =

Grave sites from the Sri Lankan civil war

Coordinates: 9.662855350939568°N 80.06189273908284°E

- Chemmani (Northern Province)
- Location: Chemmani, Jaffna District, Sri Lanka
- Date: 1995-1996
- Attack type: Murder
- Weapons: Guns, blades, Mammoty
- Deaths: 582+ Tamil men, women and children
- Perpetrator: Sri Lanka Army

Chemmani mass graves are several mass graves discovered in Chemmani in northern Sri Lanka. They first received attention following the claim of their existence by a Sri Lankan soldier, Somaratne Rajapakse, in 1998 who was on trial for the rape and murder of Tamil schoolgirl Krishanthi Kumaraswamy. He claimed that hundreds of people who disappeared from the Jaffna peninsula after it was retaken by the government forces from the LTTE rebels in 1995 and 1996 were killed by the army and buried in mass graves near the village of Chemmani. He further claimed he knew where 300 to 400 bodies were buried.

Internationally observed excavations in 1999 found 15 bodies, two of which were identified as men who had disappeared in 1996. The findings led to the arrest of four army officers who were released on bail in 2000 and were later promoted. The case came to an end in 2006 after the Attorney General refused to take action. In June 2025, Chemmani regained attention after a new set of mass graves were identified in the area, fuelling calls for international oversight into excavating mass graves on the island. A court-ordered excavation led by a senior archeologist recovered 19 human skeletons, including 3 infants. Subsequent excavations led to the discovery of 582 skeletons in total by 20 August 2026, making it the largest mass grave in the country. The skeletons were found heaped together in a disorderly fashion and most of them lacked clothing. A skeleton of a girl estimated to be between 4-5 years old alongside a school bag and a toy were among those recovered.

== Background ==
In 1997, Amnesty International reported that after the Sri Lankan security forces regained control over the Jaffna peninsula between 1995-1996, 648 Tamils were reported to have disappeared. Many were believed to have been massacred after being detained by the security forces. In July 1998, Sri Lankan Army Lance Corporal Somaratne Rajapakse, facing a death sentence for the rape and murder of student Krishanti Kumaraswamy and her family, made claims about the existence of mass graves in Jaffna containing the bodies of those who had disappeared from the peninsula in previous years. In a long statement Rajapaksa stated that there had been widespread detention, torture and murder of civilians who had been rounded up for questioning by the army. Rajapakse denied killing Krishanti and said he was only carrying out the orders of senior officers to bury bodies. He named 20 army officers who were involved in torture and murder, and described the rape and killing of Tamil civilians:

"One day I was asked to bring a mammoty by Captain Lalith Hewa. When I took it to him he was with a woman who had no clothes on. This woman and her husband were brought to the camp earlier that day. Lalith Hewa had raped the woman and later attacked her and her husband with the mammoty I brought to him. Both of them died. Lalith Hewa tried to bury them there himself but he couldn't do it. Then the bodies were brought to Chemmani. I can show you where the bodies were buried."

He further told the court that 300 to 400 bodies were buried at the site and that "almost every evening, dead bodies were brought there and the soldiers were asked to bury them".

The Sri Lankan Ministry of Defense opened an investigation and the Human Rights Commission of Sri Lanka asked for United Nations assistance. In June 1999, Rajapakse identified a site where the bodies of two young men who had disappeared in 1996 were exhumed. Additional sites identified by Rajapakse's co-defendants yielded 13 more bodies. The excavations were witnessed by international observers, including personnel from Amnesty International.

== Investigation ==
In December, a government team of investigators reported that 10 of the remains, including one skeleton that was bound and blindfolded, showed evidence of assault and murder. The cause of death was not determined for the remaining bodies.

Rajapakse and the others had alleged the existence of many more bodies. In 1999, the Sri Lankan government claimed that "local and foreign experts" had reached "a unanimous decision that there are no such graves as originally alleged by the convicted prisoner Somaratne Rajapakse and others convicted of the Krishanthy Kumaraswamy rape and murder case."

Identification of the bodies continued into 2000, and in March, warrants were issued for the arrest of seven military personnel. All of the suspects were released on bail, and as of 2004, the U.S. Department of State described the case as "pending". In January 2006, police from the Central Investigation Division said that they were awaiting instructions from the Attorney General to conclude the investigation begun six years earlier. A Colombo magistrate called the delay "unacceptable".

=== 2025-26 investigation ===
In February 2025, construction workers re-discovered the mass grave. In May, court-ordered excavations began, led by archaeologist Raj Somadeva. Hundreds of people from Jaffna with relatives who went missing from 1995 to 2008 were interested in the excavations. Human rights organizations noted that domestic efforts alone were insufficient and called for international oversight. A September 2025 report by the Human Rights Commission of Sri Lanka stated that "there is a reasonable likelihood that the burials were unlawful and pursuant to extrajudicial killings" given that the burial of naked corpses was incompatible with local Hindu customs.

== See also ==
- Mannar mass graves
- Duraiappa stadium mass grave
- Sooriyakanda mass grave
- Mass graves associated with the Sri Lankan Civil War
