= Mass grave =

Grave containing a number of human corpses

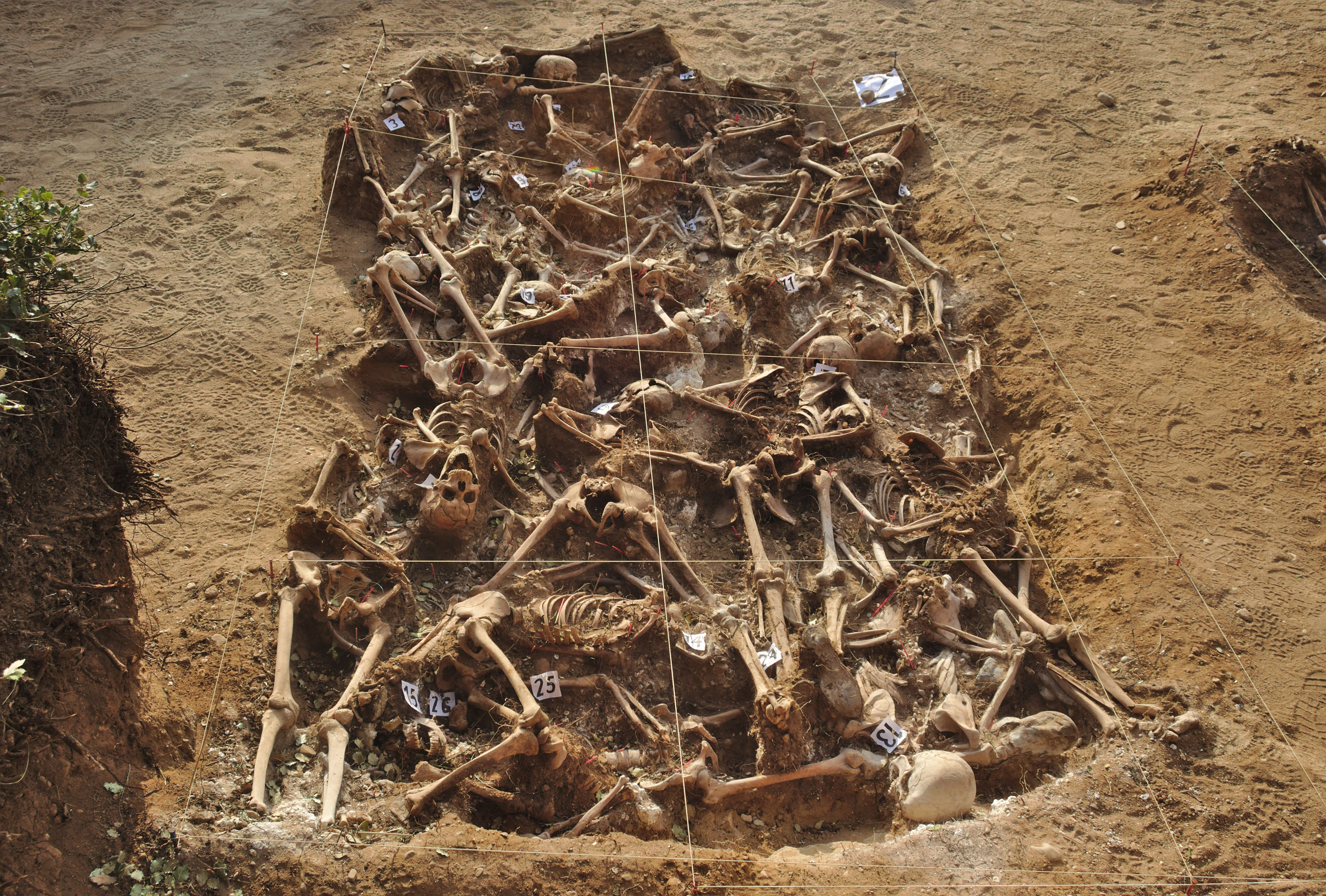
Mass grave of 26 victims of the Spanish Civil War in 1936, excavated in 2014

A mass grave is a grave containing multiple human corpses, which may or may not be identified prior to burial. Mass graves are usually created after many people die or are killed, and there is a desire to bury the corpses quickly for sanitation concerns. Although mass graves can be used during major conflicts such as war and crime, they may also be used after a famine, epidemic, or natural disaster. In disasters, mass graves are used temporarily for infection and disease control. In such cases, there is often a breakdown of the social infrastructure that would enable proper identification and the individual disposal of each body.

The United Nations has defined a criminal mass grave as a burial site containing three or more victims of execution, although an exact definition is not unanimously agreed upon.

== Background ==
=== Definitions ===
Many different definitions have been given. The Bournemouth Protocol on Mass Grave Protection and Investigation focuses on circumstances that suggest that the deaths were unlawful. Older definitions focus on the ceremonial aspect, identifying a mass grave as one whose circumstances indicate "no reverence to the individual" was being shown during the burial, regardless of the manner of death.

=== Health concerns ===
The debate surrounding mass graves among epidemiologists includes whether or not, in a natural disaster, to leave corpses for traditional individual burials, or to bury corpses in mass graves. For example, if an epidemic occurs during winter, flies are less likely to infest corpses, reducing the risk of outbreaks of dysentery, diarrhea, diphtheria, or tetanus, which decreases the urgency to use mass graves. In modern times, a mass burial after a natural disaster may be a temporary expedience using individually bagged and tagged bodies to aid later retrieval, identification, and re-burial. A 2004 study indicates that the health risks from dead bodies after natural disasters are relatively limited.

=== History ===
Mass or communal burial was a common practice before the development of a dependable crematory chamber by Ludovico Brunetti in 1873. In ancient Rome waste and dead bodies of the poor were dumped into mass graves called puticuli.

In Paris, the practice of mass burial, and in particular, the condition of the Cimetière des Innocents, led Louis XVI to eliminate Parisian cemeteries. The remains were removed and placed in the Paris underground forming the early Catacombs. Le Cimetière des Innocents alone had 6,000,000 dead to remove. Burial commenced outside the city limits in what is now Père Lachaise Cemetery.

== War and mass violence ==
=== Mongol Invasion of Kievan Rus' (1223 to 1241) ===
A mass grave containing at least 300 bodies of victims of a Mongol invasion of Kievan Rus' in the year 1238, was discovered during an excavation in 2005, in Yaroslavl, Russia.

=== Thirty Years' War (1618 to 1648) ===
A mass grave containing at least 47 soldiers that were brutally massacred following the Battle of Lützen of the Thirty Years' War, in the 17th century, which was Europe's deadliest religious conflict, was exhumed and reported in 2017 of PLOS One magazine. Archaeological and osteological analyses found that the soldiers ranged in age from 15–50 years. Most corpses had evidence of blunt force trauma to the head while seven men had stabbing injuries. Most of the soldiers died from gunshot wounds inflicted by pistols and cavalry carbines.

=== Napoleonic Wars (1803 to 1815) ===
Several mass graves have been discovered that were the result of Napoleonic battles, mass graves were dug for expeditious disposal of deceased soldiers and horses. Often soldiers would plunder the substantial quantity of corpses prior to burial. Generally the mass graves were dug by soldiers or members of logistical corps. If these units were not available, the corpses would be left to rot or would be burned. Such examples have been found scattered throughout Europe.

=== Finnish Civil War (1918) ===
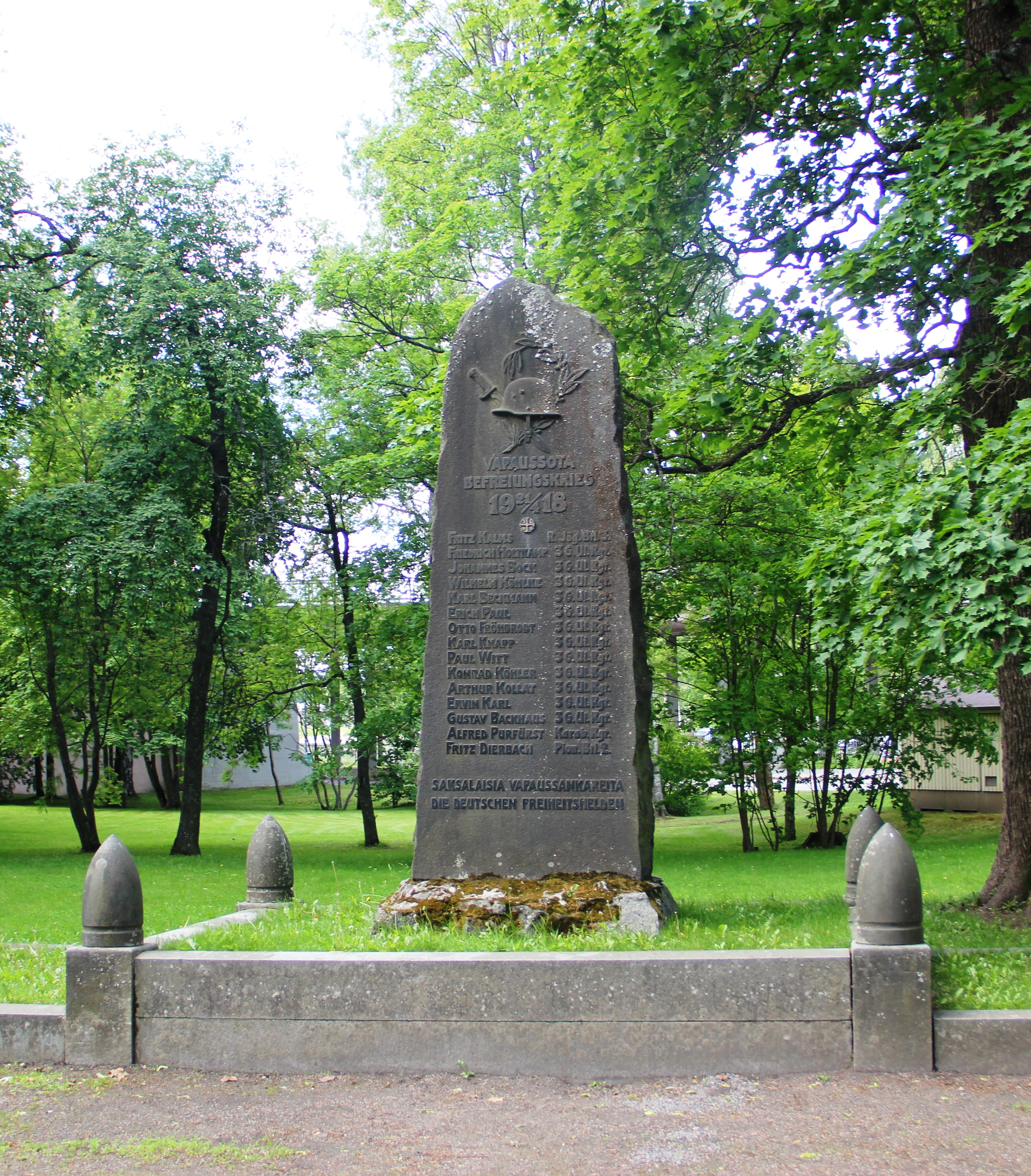
The mass grave of the German troops who fell in the Battle of Hyvinkää in 1918 during the Finnish Civil War in Hyvinkää, Finland.

Most mass graves dug during the Finnish Civil War hold Reds, the communist Soviet-backed side. Many mass graves are located in uninhabited areas near the sites of the execution including the Pohjois-Haaga mass grave, the Tammisaari mass grave and the Hyvinkää mass grave. The Mustankallio Cemetery holds a mass grave of Reds executed at the Hennala camp.

=== Tulsa race massacre (1921) ===
Mass graves from the Tulsa race massacre were excavated in September 2023.

=== Spanish Civil War (1936 to 1939) ===
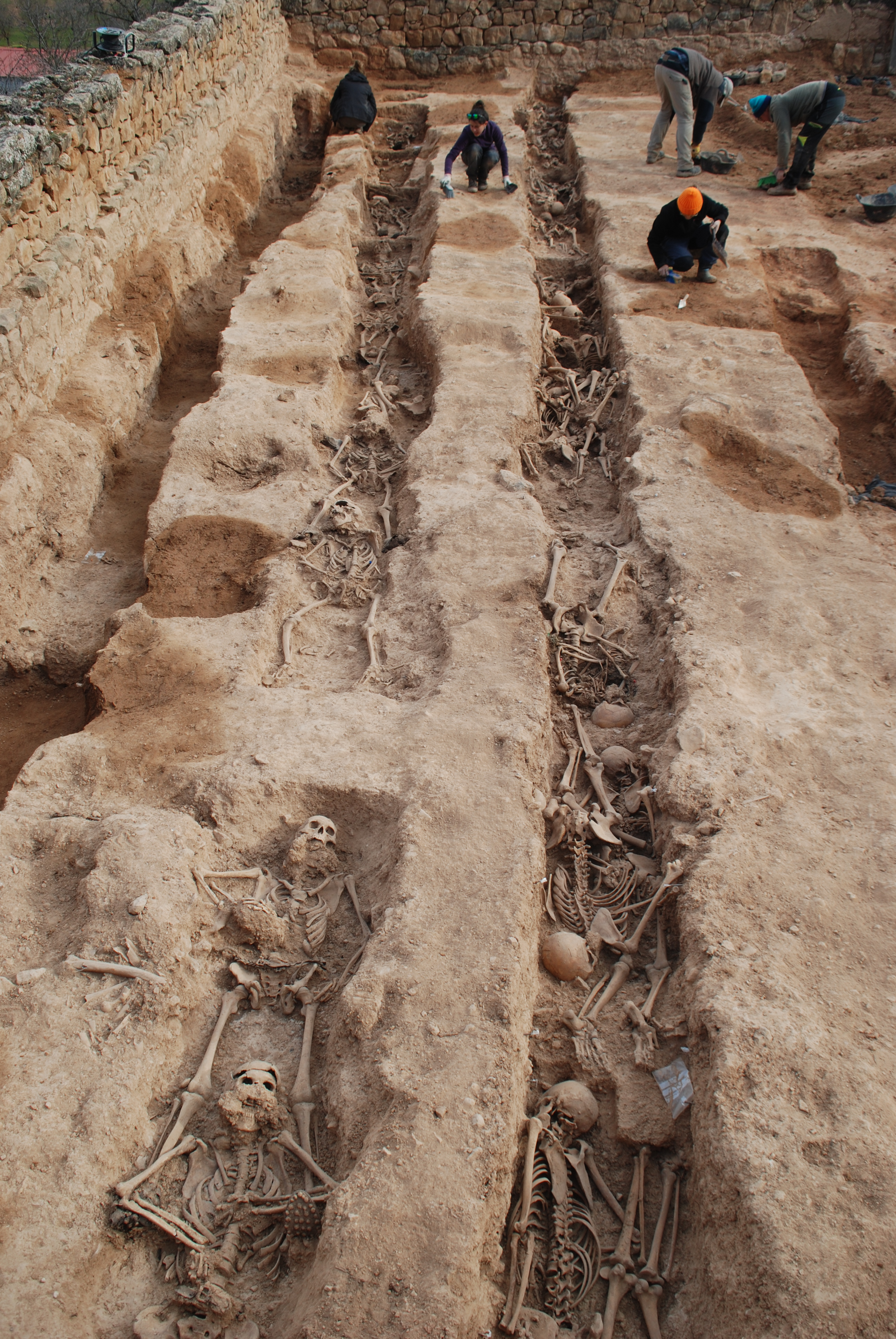
Mass grave of Spanish Civil War victims in El Soleràs

There are over 2,000 known mass graves throughout Spain from the Spanish Civil War wherein an estimated 500,000 people died between 1936 and 1939, and approximately 135,000 were killed after the war ended.

Exhumations are ongoing. Some are conducted on the basis of information given in witnesses' and relatives' testimonies to the Asociación para la Recuperación de la Memoria Histórica (ARMH). These testimonies serve the purpose of helping geophysicists, archaeologists and forensic scientists to locate graves in order to identify bodies and allow families to rebury their relatives.

In the summer of 2008, information from these testimonies was used to unearth a 4 meter long square grave containing five skeletons near the town of San Juan del Monte. These five remains are believed to be of people that were kidnapped and killed after the 18 July 1936 military coup.

Another mass grave from the Spanish Civil War was found using Ground Penetrating Radar (GPR). Eyewitness accounts identified two potential locations for an unmarked grave in mountains of Lena in Northern Spain. Both sites were examined and an unmarked mass grave of approximately 1 meter by 5 meters was found.

Scientists investigated a second grave in 2023.

=== Second Sino-Japanese War (1937 to 1945) ===
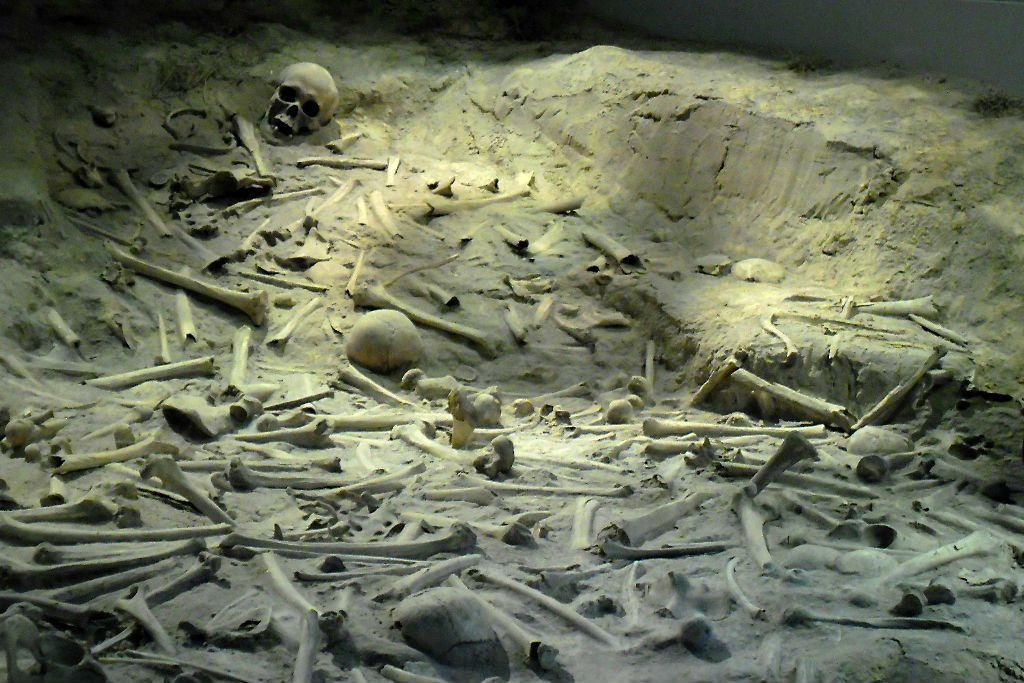
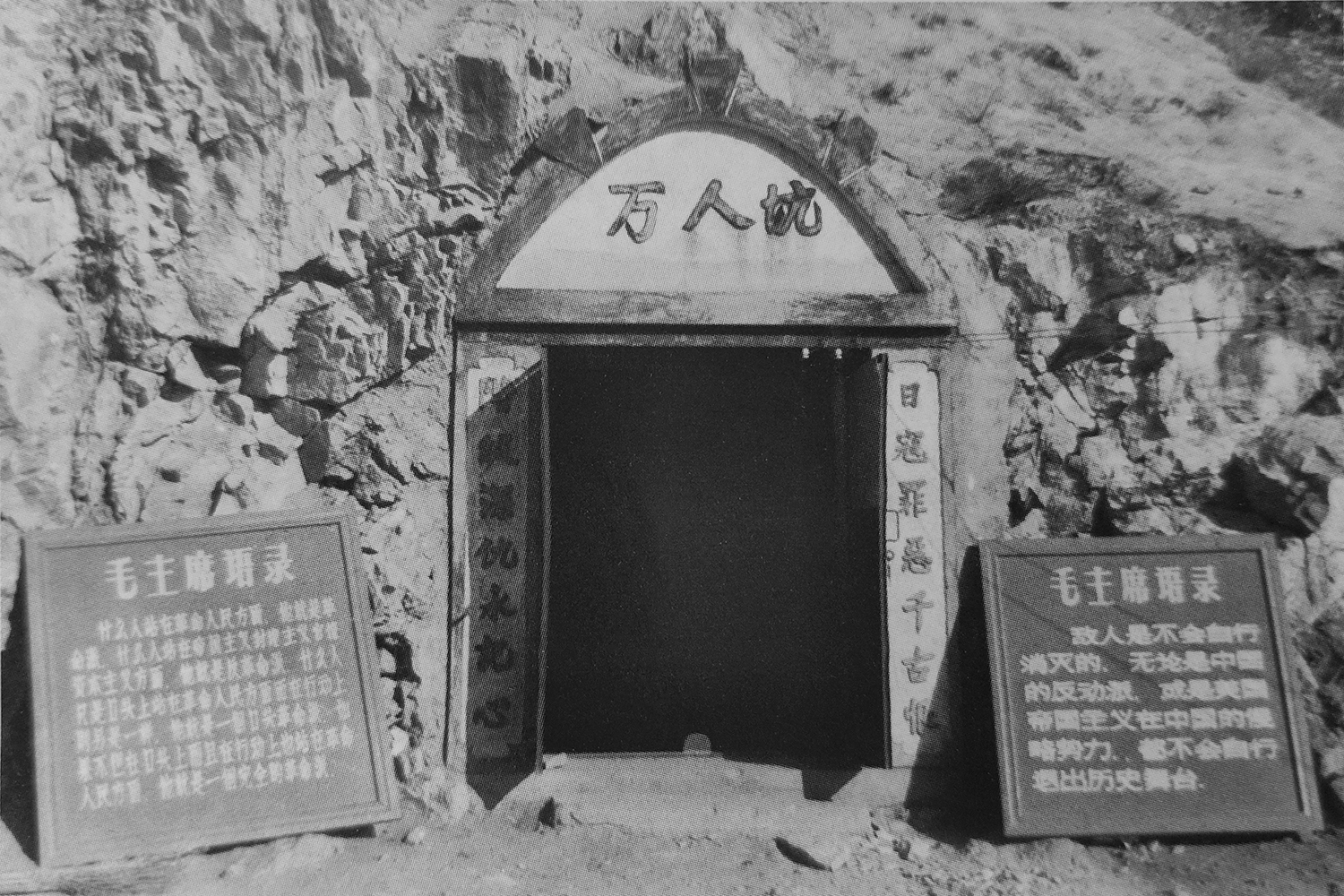
Mass graves of Second Sino Japanese War victims found in China

==== Nanjing Massacre (December 1937 to January 1938) ====
The Nanjing Massacre (also known as the "Rape of Nanking" using the 1930s Romanization) was the mass murder of Chinese civilians in Nanjing, the capital of the Republic of China, immediately after the Battle of Nanking and the retreat of the National Revolutionary Army in the Second Sino-Japanese War, by the Imperial Japanese Army. Beginning on 13 December 1937, the massacre lasted six weeks. (Note: "Six weeks long" is a convenient figure but far from precise. Killings were most intense in the first five days from 13 December and remained moderately intense until 31 December 1937, according to the Japanese military records. From 7 February 1938, killings were no longer in mass fashion as the senior Japanese officers came to restore discipline of their troops, according to the testimony of Miner Searle Bates, a humanitarian leader of the Nanking Safety Zone. None of the above dates is close to "six weeks", which should correspond to 24 January 1938. Bates testified before the Tokyo Trial on 29 July 1946, pioneering the use of "six weeks long" and describing the respective duration of random murder, looting and arson.) The perpetrators also committed other war crimes such as mass rape, looting, torture, and arson. The massacre is considered to be one of the worst wartime atrocities.

=== Holocaust (1941 to 1945) ===
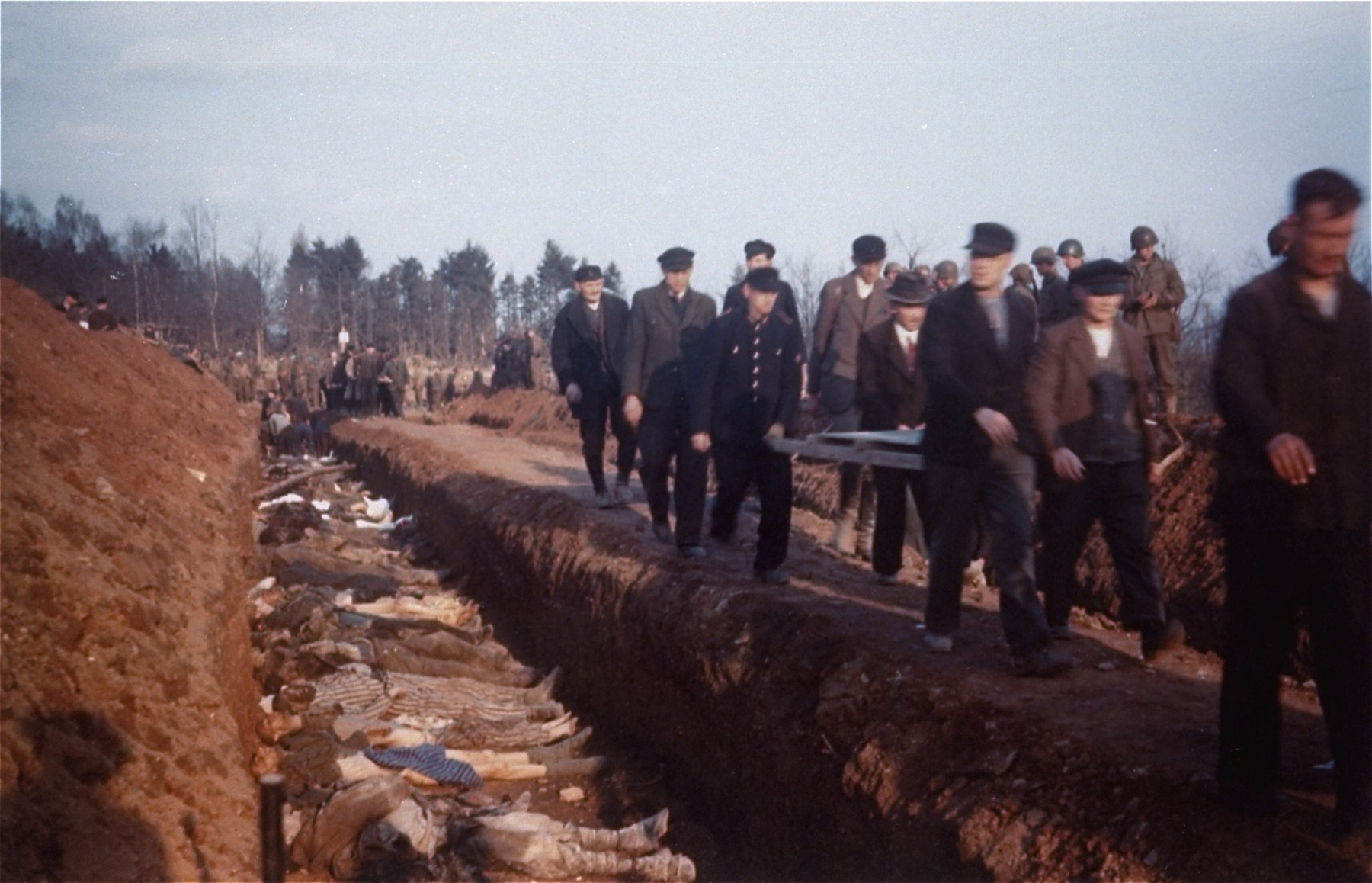
Workers from the town of Nordhausen bury corpses found at Mittelbau-Dora concentration camp in 1945.

The Mittelbau camps held about 60,000 prisoners of The Holocaust between August 1943 and March 1945. Conservative estimates assume that at least 20,000 inmates perished at the Mittelbau-Dora concentration camp. In early April 1945, an unknown number of prisoners perished in death marches following the evacuation of prisoners from Mittelbau camps to Bergen-Belsen concentration camp in northern Germany.

In April 1945, U.S. soldiers liberated the Mittelbau-Dora concentration camp. Only a few prisoners were still in the camp and the U.S. soldiers found the remains of approximately 1,300 prisoners in the Boelcke barracks. The names of these prisoners are unknown. Mass graves of the dead prisoners from the Mittelbau-Dora concentration camp were dug by German civilians under orders from U.S. soldiers.

=== 1948 Israeli Independence War ===
==== Hadassah medical convoy massacre (13 April 1948) ====
The Hadassah convoy massacre took place on 13 April 1948, when a convoy, escorted by Haganah militia, bringing medical and military supplies and personnel to Hadassah Hospital on Mount Scopus, Jerusalem, was ambushed by Arab forces. The attack killed 79 people, including: medics, associated personnel, insurgent fighters from the Haganah, and one British soldier. Dozens of unidentified bodies, burned beyond recognition, were buried in a mass grave in the Sanhedria Cemetery.

==== Tantura massacre (23 May 1948) ====
Tantura was a Palestinian fishing village. Historians and Palestinian survivors claimed the men in Tantura were the victims of a mass execution after surrendering to the Alexandroni Brigade, and then their bodies buried in a mass grave. The grave in Tantura was investigated by Forensic Architecture, a research agency based at Goldsmiths, University of London. The grave is currently under the carpark of a popular Israeli beach.

=== Korean War (1950 to 1953) ===
Approximately 100,000–200,000 civilians were killed at the start of the Korean War. These people were flagged by the government of South Korea for potentially collaborating with or sympathizing with North Korea. They were arrested and subsequently executed without trial. The sites where the massacres occurred were forbidden to the public. The bodies were considered to be traitors and the act of associating with them was considered treasonous. Despite this, families retrieved bodies from the shallow forbidden mass graves at the massacre sites.

In 1956, bereaved families and villagers exhumed over 100 decomposed and unidentifiable bodies, ensuring that the complete human skeleton was intact. Each exhumed body was buried in its own "nameless grave" in a cemetery on Jeju Island. There is a granite memorial within the cemetery which bears the cemetery's local name, "Graves of One Hundred Ancestors and One Descendant." This name functions to express the opposite of how the genealogy should be as typically many descendants derive from one ancestor.

=== Vietnam War (1955 to 1975) ===
Numerous mass graves were discovered during the Vietnam War. In the fall of 1969, the body count unearthed from mass graves was around 2,800. During the months and years that followed the Battle of Huế, dozens of mass graves were discovered in and around Huế. The victims of the Huế massacre buried in mass graves included government officials, innocent civilians, women and children. They were tortured, executed and in some cases, buried alive. The estimated death toll was between 2,800 and 6,000 civilians and prisoners of war, or 5–10% of the total population of Huế.

In Quang Ngai, a mass grave of 10 soldiers was discovered on 28 December 2011. These soldiers were buried alongside their belongings including wallets, backpacks, guns, ammunition, mirrors, and combs.

Other larger mass graves of Vietnamese soldiers are believed to exist, with hundreds of soldiers in each grave.

=== Six Day War (1967) ===
Israeli military historian Aryeh Yitzhaki, who worked in the IDF's history department, said he had collected testimony from dozens of officers who admitted to killing Egyptian prisoners of war at various locations during the Six Day War. Yitzhaki reported the case to his superiors, but the report remained in storage at IDF headquarters, until 1995, when the Washington Post reported two mass graves at Arish in the Sinai Peninsula.

==== Ras Sedr massacre (8 June 1967) ====
Ras Sedr massacre (Arabic: مجزرة رأس سدر) was the extrajudicial execution of at least 52 Egyptian prisoners of war by a paratrooper unit of the Israel Defense Forces, that took place immediately after the unit conquered Ras Sedr in the Sinai Peninsula on 8 June 1967 during the Six-Day War.

==== El Arish massacre (8 June 1967) ====
In 1995 two mass graves were found near Arish. According to the Egyptian Organization for Human Rights, the Israel Defense Forces massacred "hundreds" of Egyptian prisoners of war or wounded soldiers in the Sinai peninsula, on 8 June 1967. Survivors alleged that approximately 400 wounded Egyptians were buried alive outside the captured El Arish International Airport, and that 150 prisoners in the mountains of the Sinai were run over by Israeli tanks. Egyptian researchers have found mass graves of Egyptian POWs from 1967. The expedition was sponsored by al-Ahram, Cairo's government-run newspaper in 1995. Conservative Israeli media and the Boston-based pro-Israel media advocacy organization "CAMERA" deny that there was a "massacre".

==== Graves at Kibbutz Nahshon ====
After the Six-Day War in 1967, some 80 Egyptian soldiers were buried in a mass-grave in fields tended by kibbutz Nahshon. The field was later turned into a theme park called "Mini Israel". The commanders included 25 who burnt to death in a wild fire. An attempt to publish this information in the 1990s was forbidden by the military censor, but the suppression order was lifted in 2022. After publication in Israeli newspapers, Yedioth Ahronoth and Haaretz, Egyptian president Abdel Fattah al-Sisi raised the issue with Israeli prime minister Yair Lapid, who directed his military secretary, "to examine the issue in-depth and to update Egyptian officials".

=== 1973 Yom Kippur War ===
On the 6th of October 1973, Egypt and Syria launched a simultaneous surprise attack on Israel in an attempt to recover lost territories during the Six Day War. In retaliation for the previous killings of Egyptians pows in previous wars, Egyptian forces shot dozens of Israeli POW's to death. In subsequent years, remains of Israeli POW's were found on the ruins of the Bar Lev Line. Israeli historian Ariel Yitzhak estimated that 200 Israelis were shot dead by the Egyptians during the war. An Israeli soldier stated that he saw 11 of his fellow soldiers getting shot dead by Egyptian forces.

=== 1973 Chilean coup d'état ===
The Chilean military coup against President Salvador Allende occurred on 11 September 1973. The military surrounded Santiago and searched for people hiding in potential guerilla insurgent locations. Civilians were detained for long periods of time and some disappeared. Following the coup, bodies were abundant in the streets and in the Mapocho River. It is estimated that 3,200 people were executed or disappeared between 1973 and 1990 in Chile. Higher estimates are up to 4,500 people. These bodies were taken to morgues to be identified and claimed. Unidentified bodies were buried in marked mass graves.

From this conflict, several hidden mass graves have been identified. In December 1978, 15 bodies were discovered in an abandoned limestone mine in Lonquén. In October 1979, 19 bodies were exhumed after being secretly buried at the cemetery of Yumbel. Mass graves were also identified in Santiago's General Cemetery with multiple bodies being forced into a single coffin. This cemetery had an influx of over 300 bodies within a three-month time span. These mass graves were distinguished by a cross with the initials "NN." "NN" is indicative of the phrase "Nomen Nescio" or "no name." Following extensive media coverage of these mass graves, the Chilean military decided to exhume the bodies from Lonquén, Yumbel, and Santiago's General Cemetery. The military airdropped the exhumed bodies over open water or remote mountain locations.

=== 1974 Turkish Invasion of Cyprus ===
Many mass graves of both Turkish and Greek Cypriots were found in Cyprus after Turkey invaded the island in 1974. On 3 August, 14 Greek Cypriot civilians were executed and buried in a mass grave. In Eptakomi 12 Greek Cypriots were found in a mass grave executed with their hands tied. On the other hand, during the Maratha, Santalaris and Aloda massacre, 126 Turkish Cypriots including elderly people and children were murdered by EOKA B and the inhabitants of the three villages were buried in mass graves with a bulldozer. The villagers of Maratha and Santalaris, 84 to 89 people in total, were buried in the same grave. Mass graves were used to bury Turkish Cypriot victims of Tochni massacre too.

=== Cambodian genocide (1975 to 1979) ===
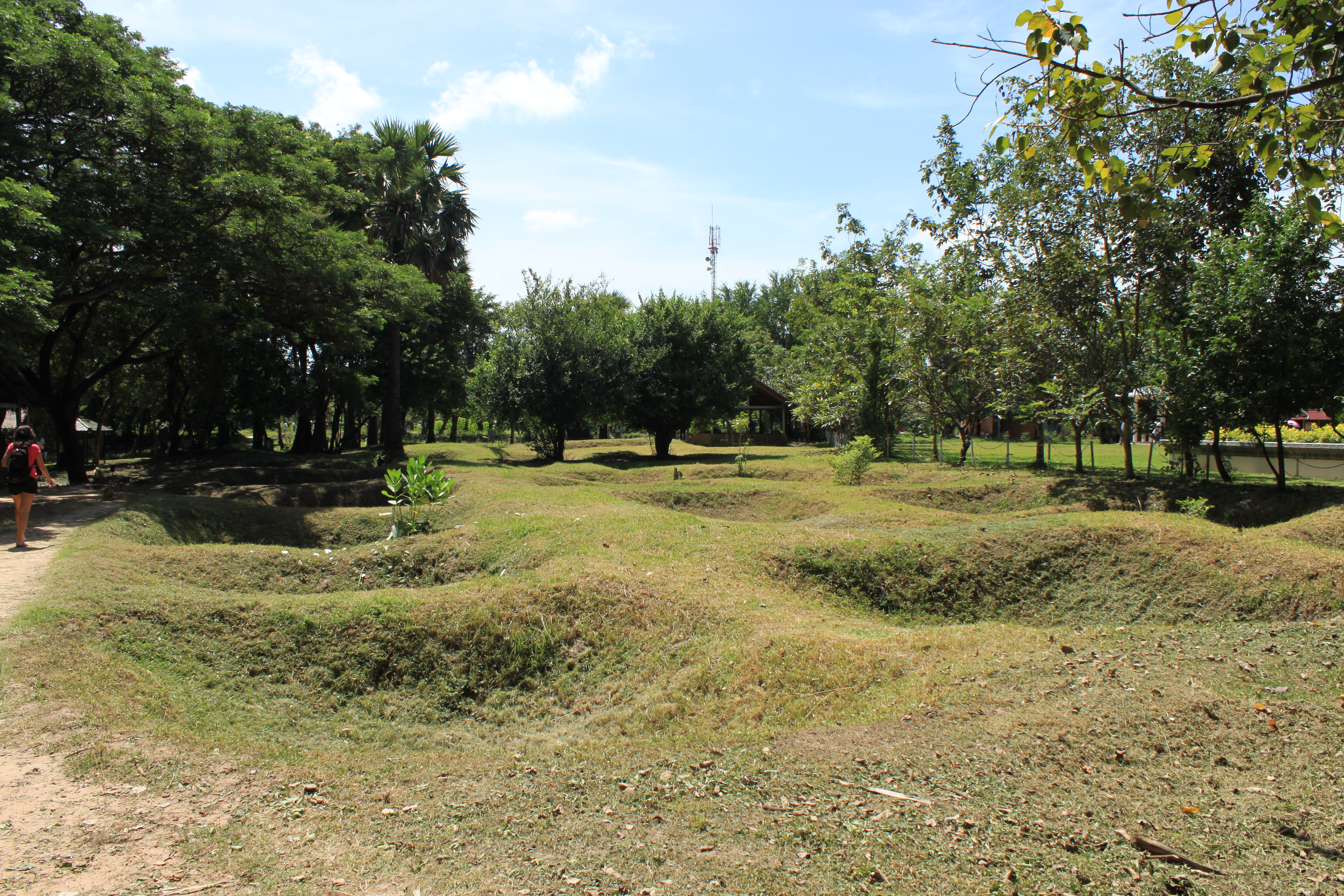
Mass graves at the Killing Fields of Choeung Ek in Cambodia.

Mass grave mapping teams have located 125 Khmer Rouge prison facilities and corresponding gravesites to date in Cambodia while researching the Killing Fields. These mass graves are believed by villagers to possess tutelary spirits and signify the dead bodies becoming one with the earth. Buddhist rituals, which were taboo at the time, were performed in the 1980s which transformed the anonymous bodies into "spirits of the departed." In the 1990s, religious ceremonies were re-established and the Festival of the Dead was celebrated annually.

=== 1976 Argentine coup d'état ===
On 24 March 1976, the Argentine coup d'état occurred, in which Argentina's government was taken over by a military junta. The new dictatorship implemented travel bans, public gatherings, and a nighttime curfew. Additionally, the new dictatorship resulted in widespread violence, leading to executions and casualties.

Abducted captives were disposed of in one of the five defense zones within Argentina where they were held. The bodies were typically buried in individual marked anonymous graves. Three mass graves are known to exist on Argentinian police and military premises although other bodies were disposed of through cremation or by being airdropped over the Atlantic Ocean. Approximately 15,000 people are estimated to have been assassinated.

Argentina's largest mass grave's exhumation began in March 1984 at the San Vicente Cemetery in Cordoba. The grave was 3.5 meters deep and 25 by 2.5 meters across. It contained approximately 400 bodies. Of the recovered and exhumed bodies, 123 were of young people violently killed during the 1976–1983 dictatorship. The remaining bodies were identified as older and having died nonviolent deaths such as leprosy.

=== Rwandan genocide (1994) ===
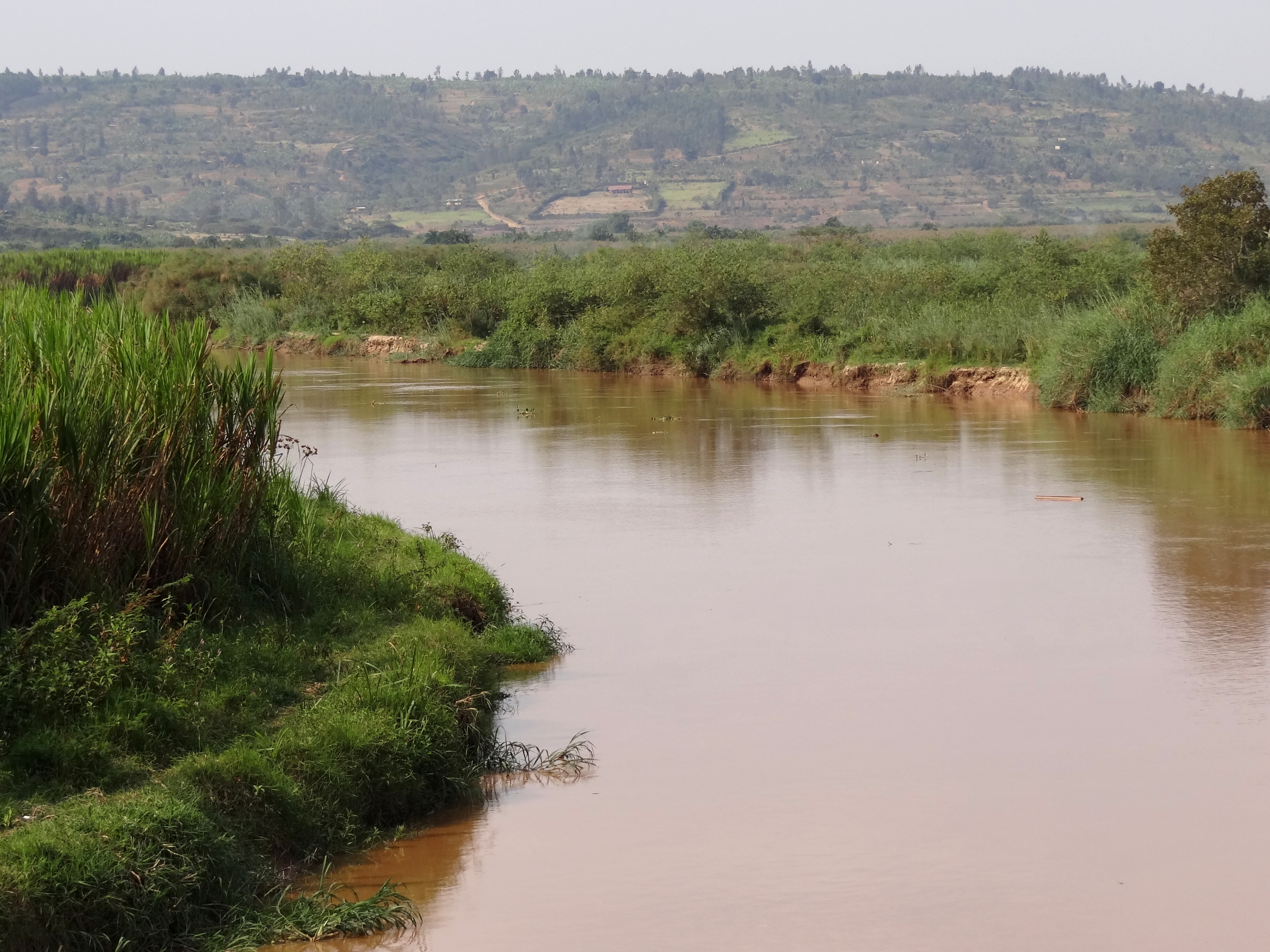
View over the Nyabarongo River where Tutsi victims were thrown in 1994, outside Kigali, Rwanda.

The Rwandan genocide began after the unsolved killing of the Rwandan president, Juvénal Habyarimana, on 6 April 1994. Extremist members of the Hutu government formed an interim wartime government. They called for an extermination of the Tutsi population, Hutu political opponents and Hutu who resisted the violence. The genocide lasted 100 days and resulted in an estimated 800,000 killings.

Rwandan people sought refuge in gathering places such as churches and stadiums. An estimated 4,000–6,000 people gathered in Kibuye Catholic Church. Around 17 April 1994, the church was surrounded by armed civilians, police and gendarmes. Those inside were attacked with a variety of weapons including grenades, guns, and machetes. Survivors of the attack were sought after and killed in the following days. Burial of these bodies took place in at least four mass graves.

The first mass grave resulting from this attack was discovered behind the church where several bodies were left unburied and scattered. In December 1995, archaeologists surveyed the area and flagged any potential human remains. In January 1996, forensic anthropologists located and exhumed 53 skeletal assemblages. A second mass grave was found under a tree marked with wire, indicating a memorial. Below the tree was a trench filled with multiple bodies. The third and fourth mass graves were found using a probe to test for deteriorating remains. The third grave was marked by the local population, similar to the second grave. The fourth grave was identified by a priest.

Throughout the Rwandan genocide, bodies were buried in mass graves, left exposed, or disposed of through rivers. At least 40,000 bodies have been discovered in Lake Victoria which connects to Akagera River.

=== Srebrenica massacre (1995) ===
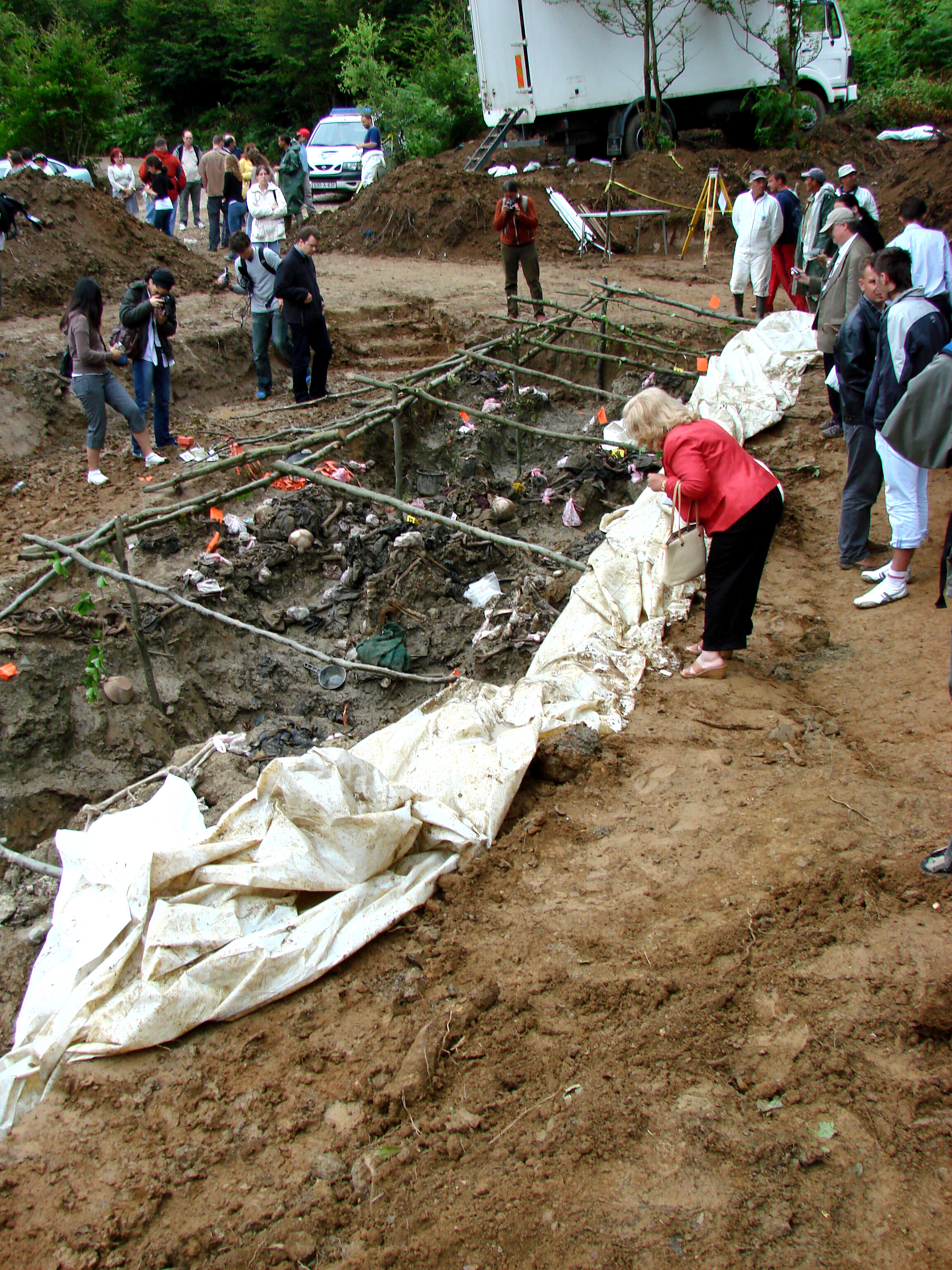
Delegates of the International Association of Genocide Scholars (IAGS) examine an exhumed mass grave of victims of the July 1995 Srebrenica massacre, outside the village of Potočari, Bosnia and Herzegovina. July 2007.

Victims of the Srebrenica massacre were murdered by the Army of Republika Srpska and buried in mass graves. Serb forces used mass graves throughout the Bosnian War and thousands of victims remain unidentified as of 2017.

=== Second Libyan Civil War (2014 to 2020) ===
The Second Libyan Civil War that began in 2014 is a proxy war between the UN-recognized Government of National Accord (GNA) of Fayez al-Sarraj and the Libyan National Army (LNA) of the militia leader Khalifa Haftar. In 2020, the GNA ousted the forces of Haftar, who is backed by the United Arab Emirates and Russia, and captured Tarhuna. The GNA discovered mass graves in the Harouda farm of the town that was under the control of the Kaniyat militiamen, who allied with Haftar in 2019. For a decade, the Kaniyat militia brutalized and killed more than a thousand civilians, where around 650 were murdered in 14 months under the UAE-backed Haftar forces. Thousands of holes were dug by government workers, where 120 bodies recovered. The unearthed remains were used by the families to identify the missing members and only 59 bodies were claimed. Survivors reported that the Kaniyat militia aligned with the UAE-backed Haftar tortured or electrocuted them. Many also reported being beaten by the militia.

=== Russian Invasion of Ukraine (2022 to present) ===
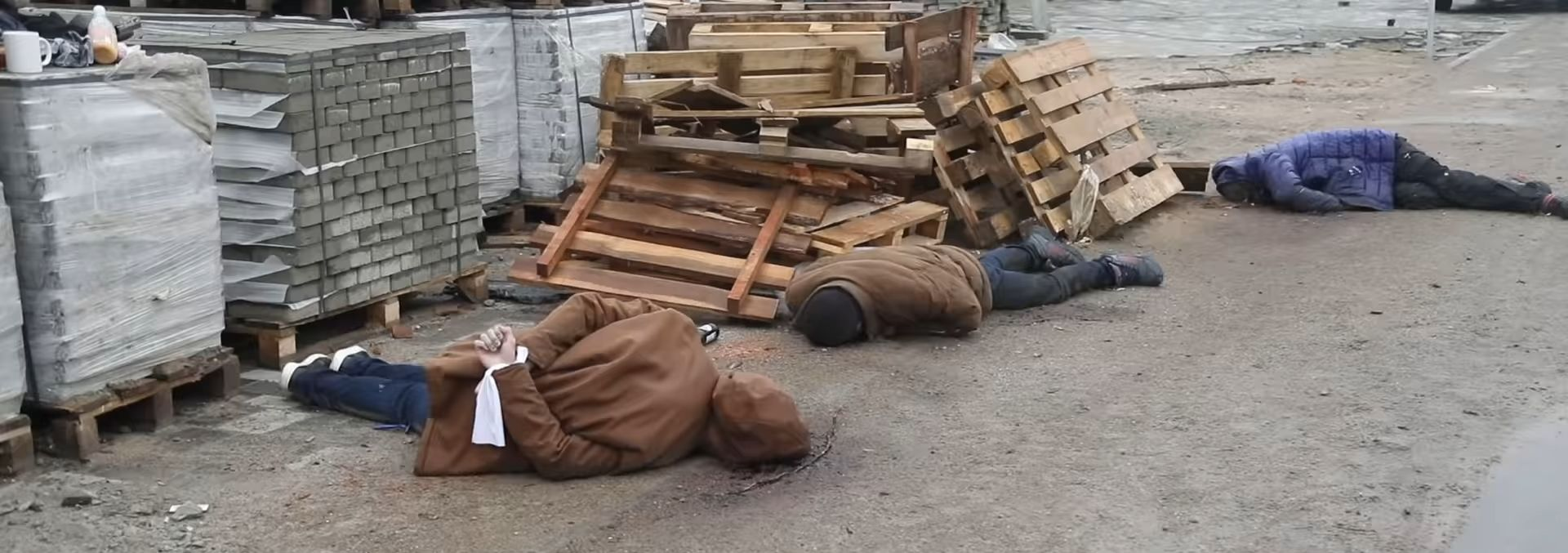
Photo of civilians shot in Bucha, one with wrists tied.

==== Bucha ====
On 1 April 2022, following the Russian withdrawal, video footage was posted to social media, that showed mass civilian casualties. By 9 April, Ukrainian forensic investigators had begun recovering bodies from mass graves, such as at the church of Andrew the Apostle. 116 bodies were found in the mass grave near the Church of Andrew the Apostle. On 21 April, Human Rights Watch published an extensive report that summarized their own investigation in Bucha, implicating Russian troops in summary executions, other unlawful killings, enforced disappearances, and torture.

==== Mariupol ====
Mariupol's deputy mayor Serhii Orlov stated on 9 March 2022 that at least 1,170 civilians in the city had been killed in the city since Russia's invasion began and the dead were being buried in mass graves.

By April 2022 several new mass graves located in vicinity of Mariupol were discovered using satellite footage.

In early November 2022, Ukraine stated that at least 25,000 civilians had been killed in Mariupol. In late December 2022, based on the discovery of 10,300 new mass graves, the Associated Press estimated that the true death toll may be up to three times that figure.

==== Izium ====
On 15 September 2022, several mass graves, including one site containing at least 440 bodies were found in woods near the Ukrainian city of Izium after it was recaptured by Ukrainian forces. The graves contained bodies of people who were killed by Russian forces. One of the victims was a Ukrainian poet, children's writer, activist and Wikipedian Volodymyr Vakulenko.

According to Ukrainian investigators, 447 bodies were discovered: 414 bodies of civilians (215 men, 194 women, 5 children), 22 servicemen, and 11 bodies whose gender had not yet been determined as of 23 September 2022. Most of the dead showed signs of violent death and 30 presented traces of torture and summary execution, including ropes around their necks, bound hands, broken limbs and genital amputation.

=== Gaza War (2023 to present) ===
==== Nasser Medical Complex, Khan Yunis ====
In April 2024, following the withdrawal of Israeli forces, over 300 bodies were unearthed at the Nasser Medical Complex in Khan Younis, Gaza. According to Colonel Yamen Abu Suleiman some of the bodies exhibited signs of having been bound and potentially executed in the field.

According to a report by France24, based on analysis of photographs and video, the location of the exhumations is in the same place as earlier mass burials conducted by Palestinians. Geoconfirmed presented a similar analysis, saying that the exhumations took place at the same location as the earlier mass burials conducted by Palestinians, although they didn't exclude the possibility that the graves had been added to by Israeli forces.

==== Al-Shifa Hospital, Gaza City ====
On 14 November 2023, officials at Al-Shifa hospital announced they had buried 179 bodies in a mass grave in the courtyard of the hospital. In April 2024, health workers in Gaza started exhuming bodies from the mass graves at Al-Shifa Hospital in Gaza City following the withdrawal of Israeli forces, following their two-week siege. At least 381 bodies were recovered. Officials claim that many bodies showed signs of severe trauma, including being crushed or disfigured, and claim this is partially the result of being run over by Israeli tanks during the battle. The bodies included people buried both in graves and above-ground remains, some under dirt or plastic sheeting.

== Mass executions ==
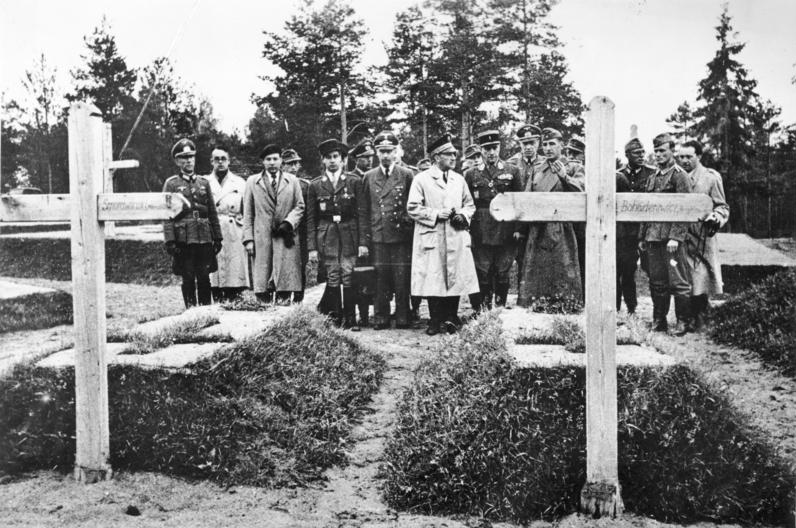
Secretary of State of the Vichy regime Fernand de Brinon and others in Katyn at the graves of Mieczysław Smorawiński and Bronisław Bohaterewicz, April 1943.

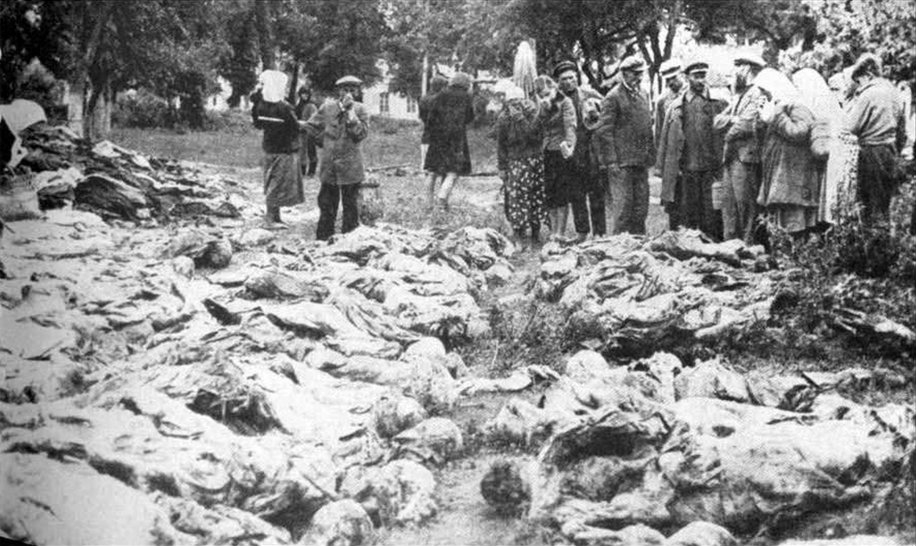
People of Vinnytsia searching for relatives among the victims of the Vinnytsia massacre exhumed from a mass grave in 1943.

=== Soviet mass killings ===
In July 2010, a mass grave was discovered next to the Peter and Paul Fortress in St. Petersburg, containing the corpses of 80 military officers executed during the Red Terror of 1918–1921. By 2013 a total of 156 bodies had been found in the same location. At about the same time a mass grave from the Stalinist period was discovered in Vladivostok, on Russia's Pacific coast.

=== Communist regime massacres in Yugoslavia ===
- Bleiburg repatriations
- Communist purges against Hungarians and Germans in Serbia in 1944–45
- Barbara Pit massacre
- Mass graves in Slovenia

=== Islamic State in Mosul ===
During the Islamic State occupation of Mosul from 2014 to 2017, the city became a site of horrific atrocities, including the creation of numerous mass graves. Islamic State militants carried out widespread executions targeting Iraqi security forces, minority communities like Yazidis and Shi'ites, journalists, suspected dissidents, and civilians who opposed their rule. After Mosul was liberated in 2017, investigators uncovered dozens of mass grave sites in and around the city, with some of the most notorious located in areas like Badush and Hamam al-Alil.

=== Islamic persecution of Christians ===
Christianity is the second most persecuted religion in the world, after Judaism. The violent persecution of Christians worldwide has been increasing constantly in number, type of attacks, and degree of violence. Particularly, violent persecution involving mass killings have been perpetrated in Muslim-majority countries, such as in Pakistan with the complicity of the government, and by Muslim groups and Islamic groups, such as by the Islamic State and Boko Haram. This has therefore seen most of the attacks in Africa and the Middle East.

A list of a very few of the massacres in only the last few years:

- Yelwata massacre
- 2023 Plateau State massacres
- Komanda massacre

In Nigeria only, more than 60,000 Christians have been slaughtered in the last two decades solely for their faith (In Odium Fidei).

== Residential institutions ==
=== Mother and baby homes ===
==== Bethany Home ====
In 2010, the bodies of 222 infants from Bethany Home, were found in a mass unmarked grave in Dublin.

=== Canadian residential schools ===
The Canadian Indian residential school system (Note: Indian is used here because of the historical nature of the article and the precision of the name, as with Indian hospital. It was, and continues to be, used by government officials, Indigenous peoples and historians while referencing the school system. The use of the name also provides relevant context about the era in which the system was established, specifically one in which Indigenous peoples in Canada were homogeneously referred to as Indians rather than by language that distinguishes First Nations, Inuit and Métis peoples. Use of Indian is limited throughout the article to proper nouns and references to government legislation.) was a network of boarding schools for Indigenous children directed and funded by the Department of Indian Affairs. Administered by various Christian churches and funded by the federal Canadian government from 1828 to 1997 Canadian Indian residential school system attempted to assimilate Indigenous children into Euro-Canadian culture and society. Over 4,000 students died while attending Canadian residential school. The deceased were often buried in school cemeteries. "Given the lack of regulations at the time", it appears that most cemeteries "were established informally", resulting in few formal documents. The age and duration of the schools suggests that most had a cemetery associated with them. Over time, many cemeteries had been abandoned, disused, and were vulnerable to accidental disturbance and weather damage. As such, the locations of many burial sites, wood grave markers and names of the deceased have been lost.

In a May 27 press release from Tk'emlúps te Secwépemc, the Indigenous group announced "that a radar survey near the former Kamloops Indian Residential School had found 'confirmation of the remains of 215 children'" (later referred to as 200 probable burials or targets of interest by Dr. Sarah Beaulieu who performed the search). The New York Times piece that broke the story the following day, as well as subsequent reporting in Canada and internationally that year, reported the discovery of "mass graves" of Indigenous children at former Canadian Indian Residential School sites. Terry Glavin of the National Post wrote that contrary to these reports, there was no mass murder of thousands of Indigenous children at Canadian Indian Residential Schools, a baseless QAnon-esque theory originating in the 1990s which Glavin noted the 2021 "mass graves" claims appear to lend credence to. Rather, work is being done on known and suspected cemeteries to try to identify burials.

As of September 2024, no bodies have been exhumed from the suspected cemeteries. In many communities, there is a lack consensus on whether to investigate detected anomalies at the risk of disturbing burials. Disputes regarding the conclusiveness of the evidence has helped spawn a fringe movement of denialism about some residential school burial sites. Academics Sean Carleton and Reid Gerbrandt have dismissed claims of a "mass grave hoax", saying that claimed discoveries of mass graves was uncommon in most popular media and that there had been public misinterpretation of what had actually been announced in 2021. Federal Justice Minister David Lametti said in 2023 that he was open to outlawing residential school denialism. His successor, Arif Virani, has not taken a position on the issue, stating his office is considering all options.

== Famine ==
=== The Great Famine ===
Ireland's Great Famine lasted from 1845 to 1849, a period wherein about one million people died. Because of the excessive number of deaths and extreme poverty, many families were unable to provide a wake or proper burial for loved ones and used mass graves instead. Archaeological excavations have taken place on Irish mass burial sites. One excavation revealed a mass grave of nearly 1,000 individuals. The skeletons within the grave were layered on top of each other in multiple sub-rectangular pits positioned less than a meter apart.

== Industrial disasters ==
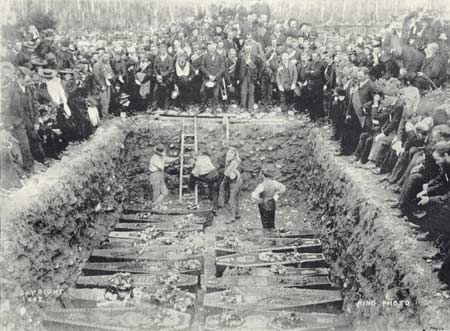
Burial of the victims of Brunner Mine disaster, New Zealand 1896.

=== Brunner Mine disaster ===
The Brunner Mine disaster occurred at 9:30 a.m. on 26 March 1896. An underground explosion caused the death of 65 miners, making it New Zealand's deadliest mining disaster. Of the 53 victims buried in Stillwater cemetery, 33 victims were in one mass grave.

== Natural disasters ==
=== 2004 Indian Ocean earthquake and tsunami ===
The 2004 Indian Ocean earthquake and tsunami led to the use of mass graves in some of the hardest-hit areas, especially in Indonesia’s Aceh province, where thousands of bodies could not be individually identified or claimed. In Aceh, officials and communities used mass burial sites for victims whose remains were unidentified after the tsunami, including the site at Ulee Lheue village, where more than 14,000 unidentified victims are reported to be buried. BBC reporting from the disaster’s 10th anniversary also noted the Siron mass grave in Aceh as a major memorial and burial site. Similar commemorations later took place at mass grave sites in Sri Lanka as well, where many victims had also never been individually identified.

=== 2010 Haitian earthquake ===
Following the 2010 Haiti earthquake, thousands of bodies were left in the streets on Port-au-Prince, exposed to the sun and beginning to decompose and smell. The government of Haiti collected the bodies on the street, along with rubble through use of dump trucks and other heavy machinery. The bodies and rubble were then transported to empty rectangular holes, 20 feet deep, 20 feet wide and 100 feet long. No efforts were taken to identify the dead that were transported and buried.

Within Haitian culture, burial rituals hold great significance and the sacred ceremonies can cost more than their own homes. There is a Haitian Vodou belief that the dead continue to live and are connected to their ancestors through these rituals. The burial of unidentified corpses in mass graves rather than familial plots severs this spiritual link between the living and dead.

=== 2013 Typhoon Haiyan ===
As the casualties of the Typhoon Haiyan were in the thousands, unidentified or unknown corpses were buried in several mass graves in Leyte (especially in Tacloban City where the most deaths happened), Samar, and other areas, while identified corpses were given to their families for burial.

=== 2023 earthquakes in Syria and Turkey ===
The death toll in the 2023 earthquakes in Turkey and Syria reached between 59,488 and 62,013 deaths. As a result, mass graves were used in some of the hardest-hit areas because the death toll was overwhelming and cemeteries, morgues, and identification systems quickly reached capacity. In Kahramanmaraş, Hatay, and Antakya, authorities and local communities dug large trench-like graves or used temporary burial grounds to handle the growing number of bodies.

== Epidemics and pandemics ==
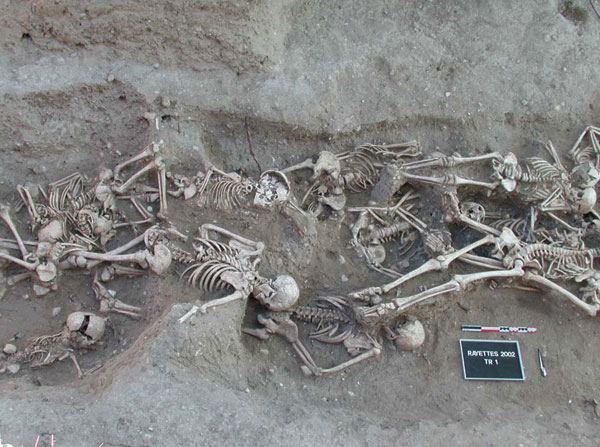
Victims of bubonic plague in a mass grave from 1720 and 1721 in Martigues, France.

=== Bubonic plague ===
The bubonic plague outbreak existed in three pandemic waves and is known as the Black Death. In the 1300s alone, an estimated 20–30 million people were killed in Europe and approximately 12 million people were killed in China. These deaths were at least 30 percent of the European population at that time. The last major outbreak of the bubonic plague occurred in London from 1665–1666 and is known as The Great Plague.

In March 2013, a plague pit of 25 skeletons was found in a 5.5 meter-wide shaft during the construction of a new railway in London. The skeletons were neatly lined up in two rows and were about 8 feet underground. Samples from 12 corpses were taken and forensic analysis confirmed traces of DNA from Yersinia pestis.

=== 1918 flu pandemic ===
In several territories, the amount of death caused by the 1918 Spanish flu pandemic was beyond the capacities of funeral industry, requiring the use of mass graves. Several mass graves of Spanish flu victims were created in Australia, Canada, and the United States.

=== Mass burials of Ebola victims ===
Burial practices were a controversial aspect of the West African Ebola epidemic. Traditional burial practices exacerbated spread of the disease, an Ebola victim is most contagious in the moments and days after death and contact with infected bodily fluids from a recently dead Ebola victim's body carries an extremely high risk of transmission, but burial practices that were seen as disrespectful exacerbated distrust of foreign medical workers.

In most cases there were mass burials of numerous individual graves and family were often unable or not allowed to participate in burial rituals.

Sometimes multiple bodies were placed in single unmarked graves.

=== Mass burials during the COVID-19 pandemic ===
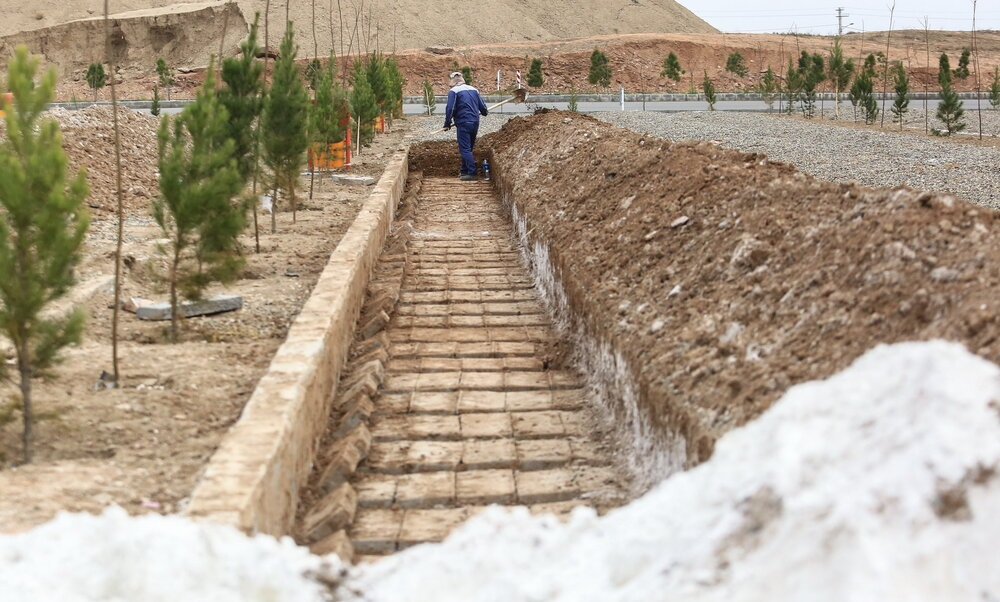
Burial site at Qom's Behesht Masoumeh Cemetery.

==== Qom, Iran ====
Reports of mass graves having been dug for COVID-19 victims have been made about Iran, using satellite pictures of sites near Qom as evidence. On 12 March 2020 The Washington Post published satellite images and analysis provided by Maxar Technologies, saying that vast burial pits were being excavated near Qom, said to be used to accommodate people who died of COVID in the city. The digging of the new section of burial pits began on 21 February 2020, only two days after the government announced their first cases of COVID-19, and then rapidly expanded. The number of fresh graves suggests preparation for a far larger number of deaths.

==== New York City ====
In New York City, mass graves were prepared in Hart Island for an influx of dead; however, other reports said mass graves would be unlikely in the United States. University of Huddersfield experts said mass graves might be considered if local services end up overwhelmed. Following the rise of deaths and morgues being overwhelmed, New York City temporarily allowed for mass graves on Hart Island for unclaimed bodies.

==== Manaus, Brazil ====
In Brazil, the city of Manaus, in the state of Amazonas, used mass graves after a large spike in deaths attributed to the pandemic.

== List of mass burials by location ==
Date of deaths (Note: year-month-day (YYYY-MM-DD))	Event	Cause of deaths	Location	Then in	Now in	Coordinates	Longitude (Note: ranging from −180° West to +180° East.)
1896-03-26	Brunner Mine disaster	mining disaster	Brunner Mine	New Zealand		42°25′56″S 171°19′24″E	+171° 19′ 24″
1921	Tulsa race massacre	Pogrom	Greenwood District, Tulsa, Oklahoma	United States		36°09′34″N 95°59′11″W	-095° 59′ 11″
1967-06-08	Ras Sedr massacre	Six Day War	Ras Sedr	Israeli occupation of the Sinai Peninsula	Egypt	29°35′30″N 32°42′20″E	+032° 42′ 20″
1967-06-08	El Arish massacre	Six Day War	El Arish	Israeli occupation of the Sinai Peninsula	Egypt	31°07′55″N 33°48′12″E	+033° 48′ 12″
1967-06-??	Six Day War	Six Day War	Mini Israel near Nahshon	Israel		31°50′33″N 34°58′2.1″E	+034° 58′ 02″
2013-11-??	Typhoon Haiyan	Typhoon	Tacloban	Philippines			+125° 00'
2020-02-21	COVID-19 pandemic in Iran	COVID-19	Qom	Iran		34°38′24″N 50°52′35″E	+050° 52′ 35″
2020-03-??	COVID-19 pandemic in New York	COVID-19 among other things (Note: The increase in deaths was due to COVID-19, but the bodies that ended up buried on Hart Island died from a variety of causes. Hart Island has been used for many years as a burial ground for unclaimed bodies.)	Hart Island	United States		40°51′9″N 73°46′12″W	-073° 46' 12"

== See also ==
- Batajnica mass graves
- Chemmani mass graves investigation
- Crab Island (Lake Champlain)
- Duffy's Cut
- Duraiappa stadium mass grave
- Guba mass grave
- Maguindanao massacre
- Mass graves in Chechnya
- Mass graves in Iraq
- Mass graves in Slovenia
- Mirusuvil massacre
- Plague pit
- Potter's field
- Sooriyakanda mass grave
- Srebrenica massacre
- Disaster management
- Vukovar massacre
- Trench
- List of accidents and disasters by death toll
