= Lucius Afranius =

Lucius Afranius may refer to:

- Lucius Afranius (consul)
- Lucius Afranius (poet)
