= Gaius Titius =

Gaius Titius was a 2nd-century BCE Roman orator and tragedian of equestrian rank. The 1st-century BCE Roman statesman Cicero praised Titius for his "wit" and "refinement," stating that Titius "seems to have gone as far as any Latin orator could go without [a knowledge of] Greek literature and without much practical experience" and also that his works "seem almost to have been written by an Attic pen." Cicero also describes his tragedies, stating that they were marked by the same wit, but had "little tragic force." According to the classicist Alberto Cavarzere, the mention of "little tragic force" may imply that Titius wrote tragedies that were less melodramatic and more realistic than other contemporary Roman plays. In doing so, Titius's literary style would have served as an antecedent to the writings of the 2nd-century satirist Lucilius, who criticized the exaggerated dramatic character of other Roman tragedies. The particular literary style of Titius evidently had some influence of another poet named Lucius Afranius, whom Cicero states sought to imitate Titius. According to Cavarzere, the realistic character of Titius's tragedies and orations were likely suitable for Afranius's purposes, for he was an author of fabulae togatae, a tyle of comedy based on tragedies that sought to depict Roman political life. One work of Titius might be mentioned by the Renaissance scholar Antonius Volscus, who—in a commentary on Ovid's Heroides—states that a tragedy called Protesilaus was authored by an individual named Titinius, whose name has been interpreted a typographical error for Titius.

Macrobius, a 5th-century Roman author, mentions a speech Titius composed in support of the Lex Fannia, a law passed in 161 BCE intended to limit excessive spending on food. There is disagreement in the sources regarding the exact time frame in which Titius lived: Cicero states that he was a contemporary of Marcus Herennius, who himself lived around 100 BCE, whereas Macrobius claims that Titius was a contemporary of Lucilius. Between these two authors, Cicero is most probably in the wrong, for his later statement that Afranius—who flourished around 130 BCE—took after the style of Titius implies that the date of 100 BCE is too late. One passage from the 2nd-century author Fronto may provide further indications for the date of Titius. Fronto provides a list of various prominent Romans, including—in the exact order provided by Fronto—Cato the Elder (234–149 BCE), Ennius ( c. 239 – c. 169 BCE), Gaius Gracchus (c. 154 BCE – 121 BCE), and Titius. According to Cavarzere, this list is sorted into two couplets, each consisting of one orator and one tragedian, and the couplets are themselves sorted in chronological order—Cato and Ennius precede Gaius Gracchus and Titius, meaning that Ennius must have preceded Titius.
