= Fabula togata =

Latin comedy in a Roman setting

A fabula togata is a Latin comedy in a Roman setting, in existence since at least the second century BC. Lucius Afranius and Titus Quinctius Atta are known to have written fabulae togatae. It is also treated as an expression that functioned as the overall description of all Roman types of drama in accordance with a distinction between Roman toga and pallium. There is no existing complete fabula togata but there are surviving fragments that indicate aspects of the creative practice. Recorded sources cite how this drama could be obscene and moralistic. Seneca the Younger, a 1st-century Roman philosopher, writes that togate plays were somewhere between comedy and tragedy.

== Plots ==
The characters of fabulae togatae often dealt with particularly Roman issues. For instance, certain preserved titles of fabulae togatae refer to Roman cultural concepts, such as one play Deditio by Afranius, which is named after the deditio—the formal means by which a conquered people submitted to Roman occupation. One common theme amongst many surviving togatae is married life. Many surviving titles necessitate the existence of married couples at the heart of the play's action, such as the play Mariti ("Husbands") of Afranius or the Socrus ("Mother-in-law") of Atta. One particular play, that being Titinius's Gemina, depicts the domestic trouble wrought by a philandering husband whose unhappy wife briefly considers a divorce. At the end of the play, however, both parties reconcile, not by restoring romantic love between themselves, but instead through the wife agreeing to submit and tolerate the situation, declaring "If he hates the way I look, at least I can please my husband with my mores." Ultimately, the classicist Jarrett Welsh concludes that togate plays depict the aftermath of the betrothal that is often the conclusion to palliatae. Divorce also featured in togate plays far more than in palliatae, where it only ever surfaces as an occasional threat, but is never acted upon. One play by Afranius, Divortium, is known to have centered around two "excellent young women" ("adulescentis optumas") who had supposedly been torn apart from their happy marriages by a meddling father. The presence of divorce is also potentially implied by titles such as the Privigna ("Stepdaughter") of Titinius and the Privignus ("Stepson") of Afranius, both of which require mixed families. Given that Roman women were much more free to appear in public than Athenian women, togatae need not have relied upon plot devices such as exposure as infants or kidnapping—both prevalent in palliatae—in order to allow girls to feet their future husbands.

== Settings ==
These plays are also known to have occurred within Roman settings, unlike the fabula palliata, which were based in Greece. For example, two separate plays attributed to Afranius and Atta are both named after the Megalensia, a Roman festival, and another play ascribed to Afranius is named after the Compitalia, which was also a Roman ceremony. Moreover, Varro, a 1st-century BCE Roman author, notes that a play by Afranius specifically referenced the puticuli at the city of Rome. Another play by Titinius is known to have been entitled Hortensius, which was a specifically Roman name, and this same play also references the Roman forum and curia, though these were also sometimes used to describe other spaces outside Rome. However, these plays did not exclusively deal with the city of Rome; they also explored the multiculturalism of the Italian peninsula. For example, some togate plays were likely set within other communities throughout Italy. In one fragment of a play by Titinius, a character instructs another to "be brave, go and talk to the fiancée, no girl is of such a kind in Setia," thereby implying that the play itself takes place in the Latin community of Setia. Furthermore, one fragment of a by Titinius also mentions the people of Ferentinum, stating that the "people of Ferentinum love Greek traditions." Another play by Titinius was entitled Veliterna, though it may have referred specifically to a girl from Veliterna, rather than the city itself. That togate plays involved other Italic ethnic groups is indicated by one fragment of Titinius, wherein one character disparagingly refers to "those who speak in Oscan and Volscian: indeed, they do not know Latin."

== Characters ==
The fabula togata was distinguished from the palliata primarily by its use of Roman or Italian characters, transferring the comic situations of the bourgeois palliata to the lower-class citizens of the country towns of Italy. In fact, the grammarian Diomedes notes that this genre was sometimes referred to as tabernaria—after tabernae, which were homes for the poor—due to its emphasis on the lower classes. In contrast to plays based on Greek New Comedy, in which the protagonist is usually the son of a wealthy man, the fabulae togatae are known to have featured weavers, spinners, fullers, hairdressers, embroiderers, butlers, a freedman, and an augur. Aelius Donatus, a 4th-century grammarian, however, records that, in togatae, slaves were not allowed to be shown as more cunning than their masters, implying that the clever slave archetype of New Comedy was not present in togate plays. Surviving fragments of togate plays also include characters with Roman names, such as Quintus or Numerius, instead of the foreign Greek names belonging to characters in Plautine or Terentian comedies. Greek names are, however, not fully absent from togate play—in one fragment of a play by Afranius, a prostitute bearing the Greek name Moschis is mentioned. According to Rallo, these characters are likely intentionally framed as foreign so as to vicariously glorify the Roman matron. Essentially, since these prostitutes are—according to Roman cultural conventions—disreputable women, they must not be Roman.

In one fragment of Afranius, a woman asserts themselves as "vigilant and clever, dry, healthy," and "sober," and they also state that they are "not looking for men," but—if they were—there "are not lacking those who give willingly," for her "age is intact" and her "appearance is sufficient." According to the classicist Guiseppe Eugenio Rallo, this passage seems to suggest the existence of more complicated and diverse female roles in togatae than in palliatae. The unnamed female speaker acknowledges that she may, in fact, be virosa ("desirous of men")—a trait elsewhere described by Lucilius as characteristic of an unideal woman. Nevertheless, she proceeds to describe her youth and beauty, which—in the view of Rallo—subverts contemporary social expectations, for she extolls her own desirability in spite of others' prejudices. In another fragment of Afranius, however, a speaker—presumably a female one—seemingly laments the apparently more restrictive and submissive roles of women in togatae than in palliatae, stating "I think women in comedies are really lucky: with a quarrel and with their will they terrify their men in the blink of an eye!" In any case, the role of women was likely more varied than in palliatae, even if only because togate play covered areas such as married life and divorces, which would have necessarily showcased a broader range of lived experiences for women.

== See also ==
- Fabula atellana
- Fabula crepidata
- Fabula palliata
- Fabula praetexta
- Fabula saltata
- Theatre of ancient Rome
