= Somaratne Rajapakse =

Sri Lankan soldier

Somaratne Rajapaksa
- Occupation: Soldier
- Status: In prison
- Convictions: Murder, rape
- Criminal charges: Murder, rape
- Penalty: Death

Lance Corporal R. Dewage Somaratne Rajapaksa is a Sri Lankan soldier who was sentenced to death for the gang-rape and murder of Krishanti Kumaraswamy and three others. He is currently in prison.

== Gang rape and murders ==
Krishanti Kumaraswamy was an A-level student Chundikuli Girls' College. At 3pm on 7 September 1996, as Krishanti was returning home after sitting an examination, she was arrested by Corporal Rajapaksa at the army checkpoint on the Jaffna-Kandy Highway at Kaithady. Rajapaksa tied Krishanti's hands together and then he and two other soldiers, W. A. W. Alwis and D. M. Jayathilake, pushed her into a bunker as she screamed. She was subsequently stripped naked. When Krishanti didn't return home her family became concerned and her mother Rassammah, brother Pranavan (Poonrnavan) and family friend Kirupakaran (Sithamparam Kirupamoorthy) went searching for her. They went to the checkpoint and asked if Krishanti was there. Rajapaksa denied that she was there and the family went away. The family returned to the checkpoint in the evening and demanded that Krishanti be released. Rajapaksa arrested the three. Pranavan, who was only 16, was stripped naked like his sister. Rajapaksa claimed that he told two senior officers, Lt. Thudugala and Wijesiriwardana, of the incident who told him to "eliminate them". That night Rajapaksa and three other soldiers (A. S. P. Perera, D. M. Jayathilake and D. V. I. Kumara) took Pranavan and Kirupakaran to Chemmani saltern. The boy was still naked. There Kirupakaran was murdered by strangulation using a rope, and Pranavan followed immediately after. The bodies of the two victims were buried by the four soldiers with the assistance of two other soldiers - R. J. M. Jayasinghe and W. S. W. Alwis. Later Rassammah was also murdered by strangulation and buried by Rajapaksa with the assistance of another soldier D. G. Muthu Banda. Then Rajapaksa took Krishanti to Chemmani saltern naked, and he raped her. Then R. J. M. Jayasinghe, G. P. Priyadarshana, A. S. P. Perera, D. V. I. Kumara, D. M. Jayathilake and Abdul Hameed Nazar raped Krishanti in turn. Krishanti was then murdered by strangulation and buried naked.

Five days later the bodies of the four victims were found in a shallow grave within a cemetery. Krishanti and Pranavan's bodies had been cut into several pieces and wrapped in black colored sheets. Rassammah and Kirupakaran had been strangled with ropes.

Following local protests three soldiers and two policemen were arrested by Kankesanthurai police. Six soldiers and a policeman were charged. Two others were charged later, taking the total to nine (Lance Corporal R. Dewage Somaratne Rajapaksa, Rajapaksa Jayasinghe Mudiyanselage Jayasinghe, Reserve Police Constable Gunasekerage Pradeep Priyadarshana, Ambawattage Suranji Priyantha Perera, Waduwantrige Arnan Wijayananda Alwis, Dehigaspitiye Gedara Muthu Banda, Dissanayake Mudiyanselage Jayathilake, Lance Corporal Diyapatugama Vidanalage Indrajith Kumara and Abeysekera Pathiranalage Nishantha). Two police officers (P. A. Samarawickrema and Abdul Hameed Nazar) who helped dispose of the bodies were given immunity in return for testifying against the nine charged. P. A. Samarawickrema was arrested in connection with incident but later released. Abdul Hameed Nazar was given a conditional pardon by the Attorney General because of his "minimal involvement in the crimes".

== Case ==
The court case against eight soldiers (Somaratne Rajapaksa, R. J. M. Jayasinghe, A. S. P. Perera, W. A. W. Alwis, D. G. Muthu Banda, D. M. Jayathilake, D. V. I. Kumara and A. P. Nishantha) and a policeman (G. P. Priyadarshana) for the rape and murder of Krishanti and murders of Rassammah, Pranavan and Kirupakaran in Chemmani on or around 7 September 1996 began on 18 November 1996 at the Colombo High Court. All nine were found guilty on 3 July 1998. Six (Somaratne Rajapaksa, R. J. M. Jayasinghe, G. P. Priyadarshana, A. S. P. Perera, D. M. Jayathilake and D. V. I. Kumara) were sentenced to death. The three others (W. A. W. Alwis, D. G. Muthu Banda and A. P. Nishantha) were sentenced to 20 years imprisonment and fined 50,000 rupees (US$ 780).

== Mass graves ==
Following his conviction in July 1998 Rajapaksa issued a statement in which he claimed that he was innocent and that "there are 300 to 400 bodies buried on this land [in Chemmani]...almost every evening, dead bodies were brought there and the soldiers were asked to bury them". Investigations were begun and on 16 June 1999 Rajapaksa was brought before Jaffna Magistrate's Court. In a long statement Rajapaksa alleged that there had been widespread detention, torture and murder of civilians who had been rounded up for questioning by the army. He claimed he was only carrying out the orders of senior officers to bury bodies. He named several senior army officers who were involved in torture and murder. Rajapaksa claimed he and his co-accused could identify 16 burial sites. He was taken to Chemmani where he pointed one of the burial sites. Two skeletons were found which were later identified as mechanics from Jaffna who had disappeared after being arrested by the army on 19 August 1996.

== Attacks and death threats ==
Whilst in Welikada Prison Rajapaksa was asked by guards to sign a statement to the effect that he had been emotionally disturbed when he made the statement to the High Court about the mass graves and that it had been untrue. Rajapaksa refused to sign the statement and was attacked by prison guards on 23 August 1998, sustaining injuries to his mouth, below his left eye and to his chest. Later one of the attackers visited Rajapaksa in hospital and warned him not to talk about the attack "or you won’t be able to leave the prison alive". Rajapaksa's family also received threatening letters. In one letter from “some members of the army” Rajapaksa's wife was warned:

You are hereby informed that you should prevent the above-named from proceeding on the journey consequent to the statement made by him in Court as it will cause a big stigma on the Government of Sri Lanka and the Army. It will also be a big boost for the Tiger Organisation. You are also hereby informed that if he takes any action in this matter his wife, children and other members of his family should get ready to pay a big price by sacrificing their lives. This is the first and the last warning.

In another letter dated 26 May 1999 Rajapaksa's family were warned:

This letter is to all members of the Rajapakse family. You are hereby informed that you should make him withdraw the statement he made in the High Court following his conviction in the Krishanthy Case. Even though he was repeatedly asked to do so he continued to issue statements regarding this matter to Human Rights Organisations. Be that as it may, it appears that an inquiry is to be held during the sixth month [sic] and if he shows them the "places" please note that all the members of the family will be murdered. Please take this as the first and the last warning. If you inform the Police about this [letter] you will also be murdered. You must ensure that Rajapakse does not show the places. The relevant positions [persons] have already been arranged to be ready to murder all of you if he shows the places. With good intentions we are giving you adequate notice.

== Appeal ==
Rajapaksa and the five other convicted and sentenced to death appealed against their convictions in July 2003. The appeal was dismissed by the Supreme Court on 3 February 2004.
