= Mirusuvil =

Mirusuvil மிருசுவில் මිරුසුවිල
- Town
- Location within Northern Province
- Coordinates: 9°40′0″N 80°14′0″E
- Country: Sri Lanka
- Province: Northern
- District: Jaffna
- DS Division: Thenmarachchi

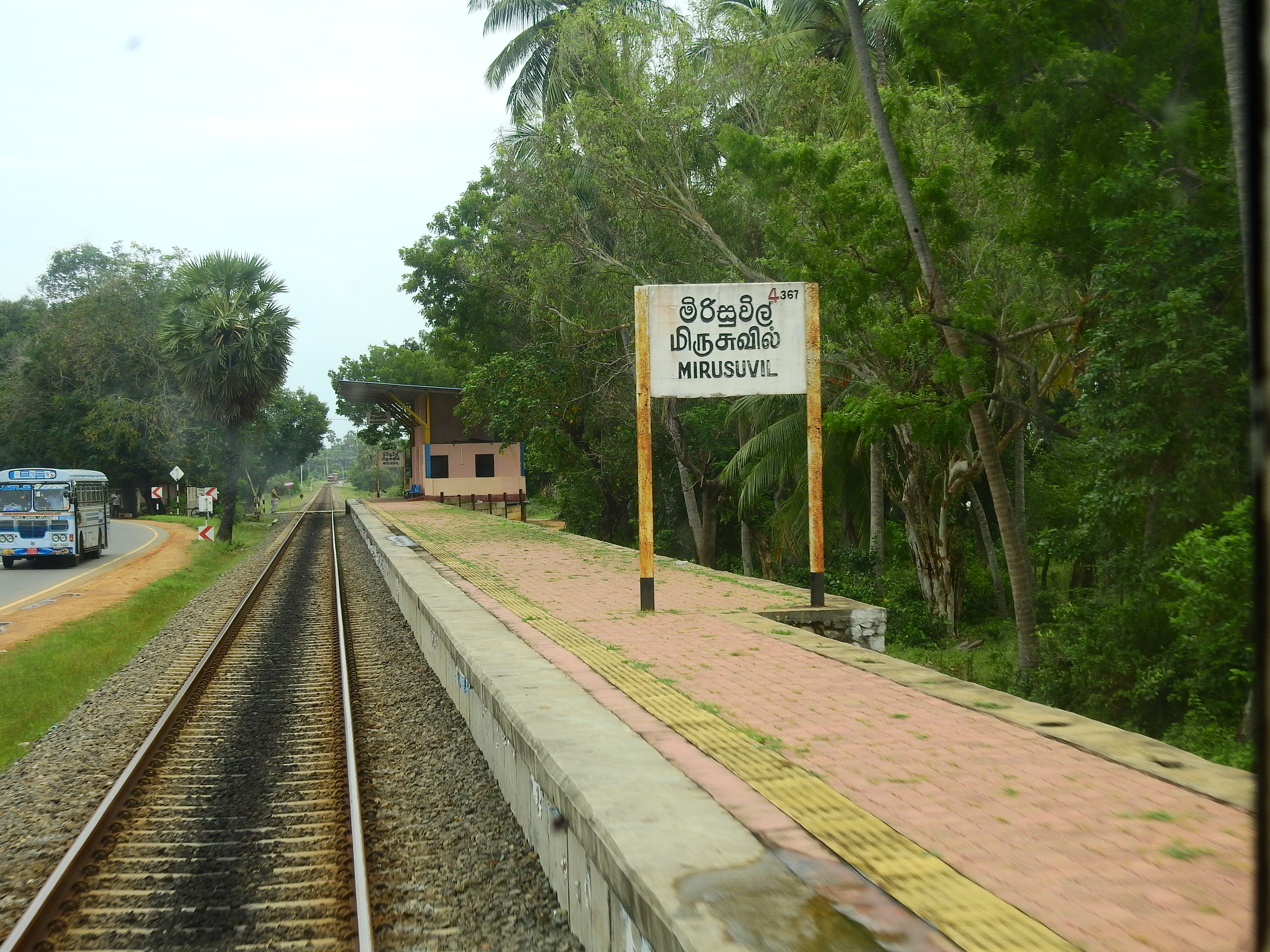
Mirusuvil Railway Station.

Mirusuvil (Tamil: மிருசுவில்) is a town in the north of Sri Lanka, near Kodikamam.

It was the site of the Mirusuvil massacre in 2000.
