= Puticuli =

Ancient Roman mass burial

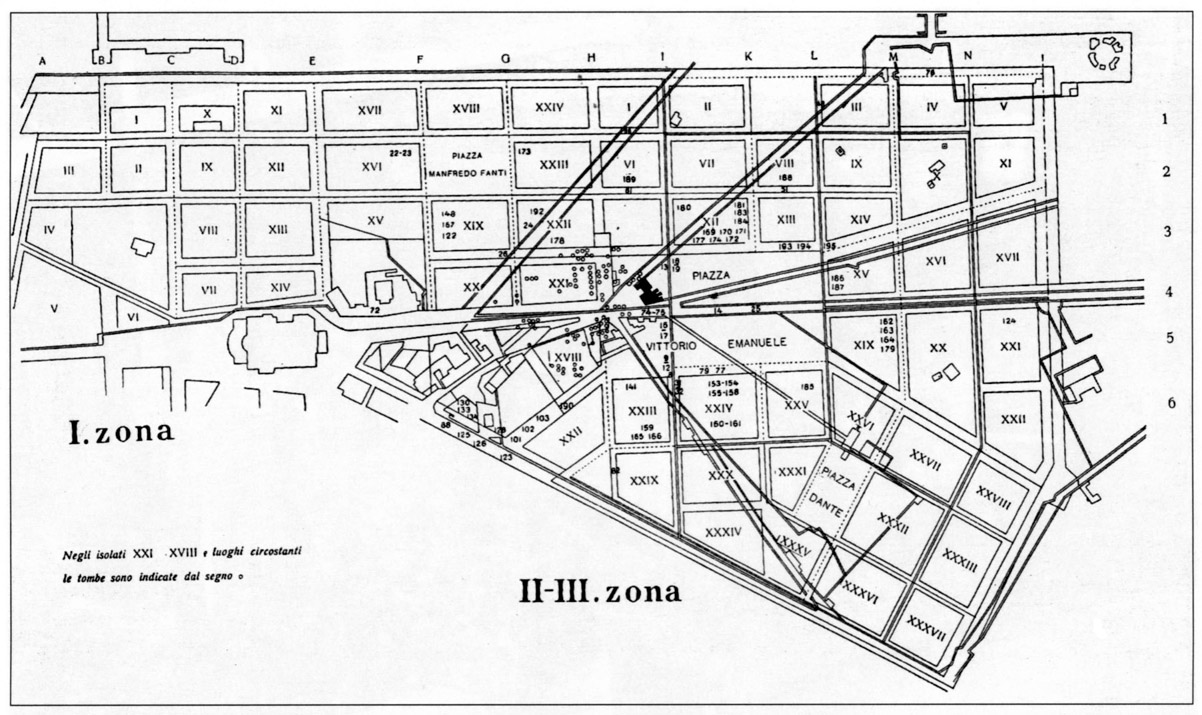
Map of the Esquiline Necropolis

Puticuli were open pits used as mass graves for the poor in ancient Rome.

== Etymology ==
According to Varro, a Roman scholar, the name originates from the Latin word for wells and pits, putei. Varro also describes an alternative etymology proposed by his mentor Aelius Stilo. Aelius believed that since the bodies were thrown into the puticuli to rot, the name originated from the Latin verb, putescebant, meaning "used to rot". Varro also cites another Roman writer named Afranius, who calls the puticuli "pit-lights". Afranius referred to the puticuli with these terms since the bodies that were thrown into the grave looked up at the light from the pit.

== Use ==
According to Varro, puticuli were located outside of towns. Puticuli were also filled with waste, animal carcasses, and rubbish; they are sometimes seen as an example of waste management in ancient Rome.

Another issue for classicists is the importance of these gravesites to Roman society. It has been argued that the ordered arrangement of graves found in this site implies the Roman government was involved in their creation and regulation. Furthermore, the limited size of the gravesites indicates they were intended for temporary use and were not a commonplace means of burial and disposal.

== Archaeology ==
Archaeological excavations conducted by Rodolfo Lanciani in 1874 unearthed mass graves in the Esquiline area. These may have been the puticuli described by Varro. According to Lanciani, the puticuli covered an area one thousand feet long and three hundred feet deep. The burial pits had an average size of 5 meters by 4 meters and were typically about 10 meters deep. Excavators identified a few examples of human remains at this site.

It is also possible this gravesite was described by Horace. Horace describes a 1,000 by 300-foot potter's field which had gardens built over it by Gaius Maecenas. This potter's field is possibly the same as the Esquilline puticuli. Lanciani excavated another gravesite underneath the Servian Wall. This may be another example of a puticuli. It consisted of about 75 pits which were 12 feet wide and 30 feet deep. They were lined with tufa and separated by a travertine wall. Lanciani found an epigraph that described a praetor named Gaius Sextius marking the limits of the area with stone.
