= Mammoty =

Type of Indian and Sri Lankan garden hoe

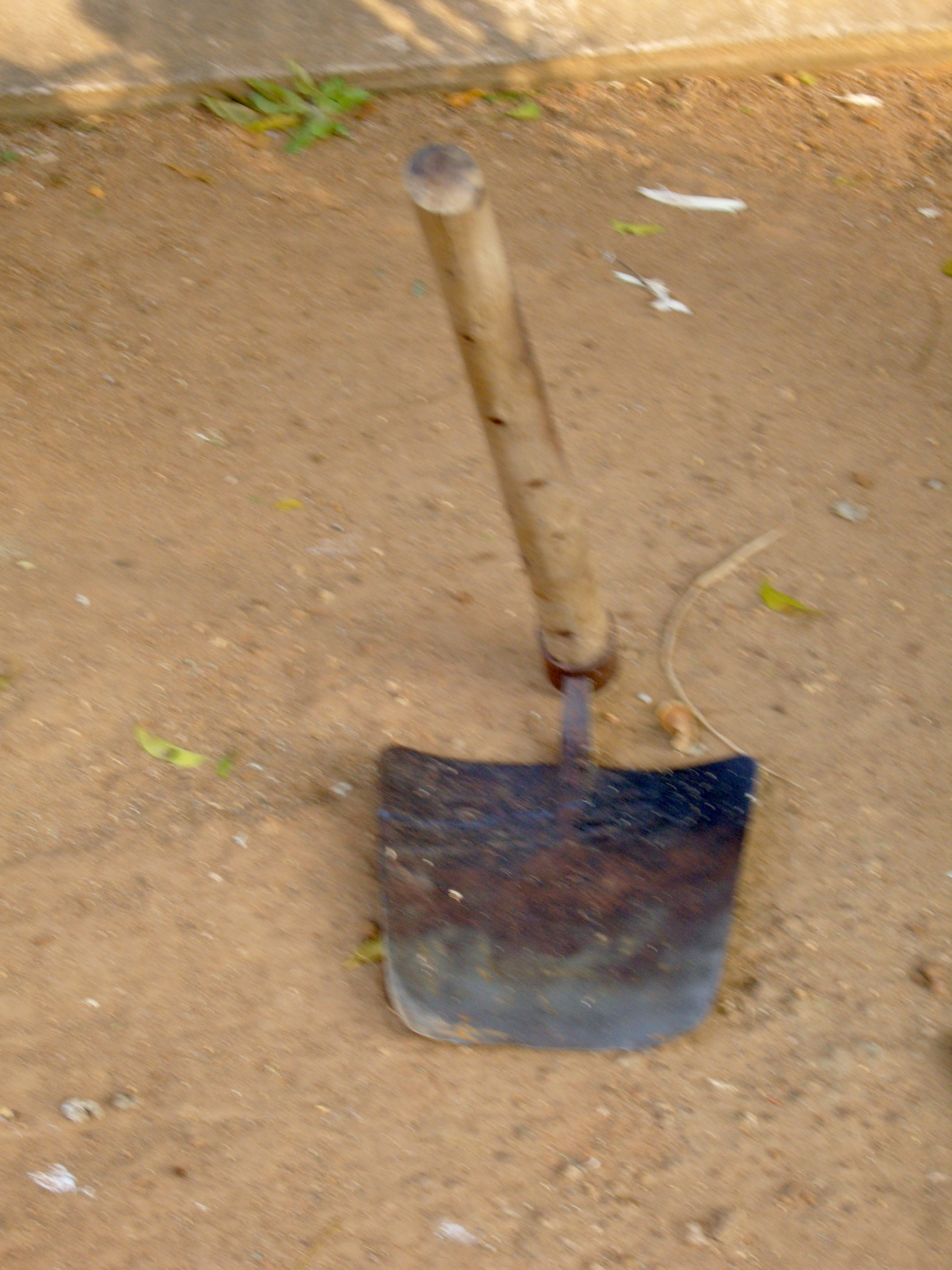

A mammootty (Tamil: மண்வெட்டி, literally "sand-cutter") is a special type of garden hoe common in India and Sri Lanka.

The mammoty's blade is about four times as large as the average garden hoe. It is the gardening implement of choice in these countries. Its name, "mammoty" comes from the word "Man Vetty" ("Man" rhymes with "one") in Tamil, a language spoken in Tamil Nadu in India and some northern parts of Sri Lanka. "Mann" in Tamil, language means earth or soil and "Vetti" refers to a cutter. Colloquially it is called "Mambutty" or "Mambty". In Sinhala, it is called උදැල්ල udælla.

It is commonly used for construction work in southern India and is also sold on online stores like Amazon. It costs about Rs.500 to 800.
