= Duraiappa stadium mass grave =

Mass grave in Jaffna, Sri Lanka

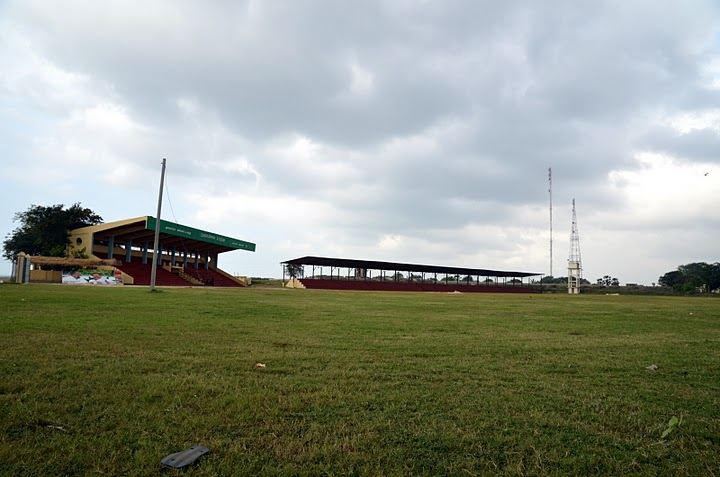
Duraiappa stadium

The Duraiappa stadium mass grave (also spelled Duraiyappah or Thuraiappa) was discovered and excavated at the Duraiappah Sports Stadium (named after Alfred Duraiappah) in the formerly embattled northern city of Jaffna, Sri Lanka, during a period of relative calm between civil conflicts. The mass grave was unearthed in stages between April 4 and 10 of 1999.

== Discovery ==
Renovation of the stadium, which was damaged and neglected during the course of the various phases of the Sri Lankan civil war, began in 1999. The attempt was hailed as a sign that normalcy had returned to the Jaffna peninsula, the battle-scarred heartland of the Tamils by the then government. Instead, it exposed one of the many secret mass graves created during the conflict between the Sinhalese majority dominated military forces and the minority Sri Lankan Tamil dominated rebel group the Liberation Tigers of Tamil Eelam, a conflict that has claimed more than 65,000 lives by 2007.

As workers sank the foundations for new changing rooms at the Duraiyappah stadium in northern Sri Lanka, their spades struck bones. Eventually 25 skeletons, including those of two children, were unearthed. As the battered skins of six oil drums were pulled back to reveal a pit a few feet across, horrified villagers clutching the identity cards of missing sons and husbands came forward to witness the layers of skulls and broken vertebrae crushed into hardened clay 3 feet below the turf.

== Eye witness ==
Paramanthan Selvarajah was one of the witnesses to the unearthing of the mass graves. He was quoted as looking for his son, Pirapakaran, who disappeared in July 1996, age 24, after being taken by the Sri Lankan army as he rode home past a checkpoint in Jaffna. "I saw his bike lying behind a bunker and heard him crying inside," he said. "We never saw him again."

Pirapakaran, a tailor, is among more than 12,000 predominantly Tamil civilians believed to have disappeared since the war began.

Jaffna Additional magistrate S. A. E. Ekanathan sought assistance from forensic experts. Ruhuna University’s Professor N. Chandrasiri declared that proper scientific methods were not used in the excavation and vital evidence may have been destroyed. Preliminary reports suggest that the site may be around ten years old, placing the suspicion on the Indian Peace Keeping Force or the rebel LTTE.

== UTHR ==
According to a local human rights group UTHR the bodies could hardly have been buried there before late 1987. The Indian Army or the IPKF was there until the end of 1989. The LTTE was in control of the area from September 1990 to October 1995. Since then the Sri Lankan Army has been in control.

According to UTHR the age of the victims had not been ascertained, which would allow the forensic experts to determine as to when they might have died. The organization demanded that an impartial investigation must be conducted and the Magistrate allow exhumations. It was noted that the basic step of issuing a public notice calling upon persons who have reason to believe, or even suspect, that the graves may contain the remains of persons in whom they have an interest, to come forward was not done, and because of this error the field has been left open to interested speculators. The forensic tests alone will not be satisfactory since the gaps between the departure of one armed party and the arrival of the next are small. It demanded that only a public testimony that will be the determining factor. The report concluded that at that time the excavations at Duraiappah Stadium are neither satisfactory nor professional.

A local newspaper demanded that as they are several more mass graves in the North-East of the country and they should be investigated impartially as well. Although news agencies reported that the skeletons were sent to capital Colombo for further forensic analysis there is no further information on this mass grave.

== See also ==
- Mass grave at Mirusuvil
- Mass grave at Chemmani
- Mass grave at Sooriyakanda
- Chemmani mass graves investigation

== Notes ==
- name: Duraiappah Stadium is named after Alfred Duraiappah, a former mayor of Jaffna city. He was assassinated by the rebel LTTE leader Velupillai Prabhakaran.
