= Raj Somadeva =

Archaeologist from Sri Lanka

- රාජ් සෝමදේව
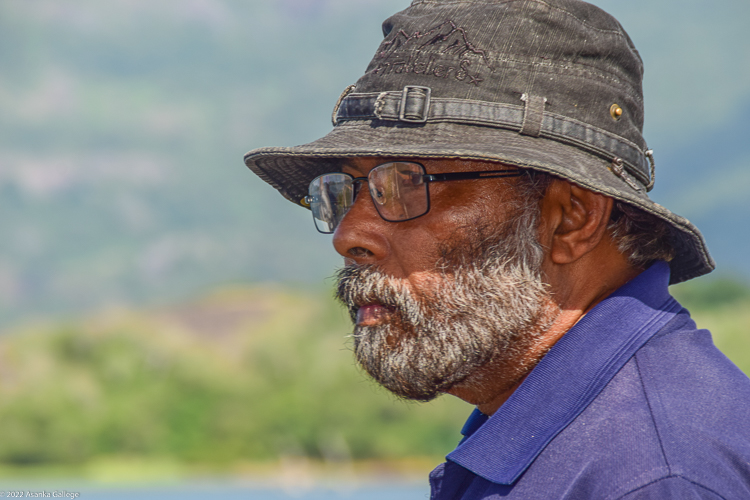
- Prof. Somadeva in 2022.
- Born: Delgahawaththage Raj Kumar Somadeva; 1 November 1960 (age 65); Wellawaya, Sri Lanka.
- Citizenship: Sri Lanka
- Education: University of Kelaniya, Uppsala University
- Spouse: Chandrika N. Jayasinghe
- Children: one
- Awards: Top Ten in Sri Lanka Award for the category of Academic Leadership and Accomplishment (1998); State Literary Award for the Best Academic Publication in English (2013)
- Scientific career
- Fields: Archaeology
- Workplaces: Postgraduate Institute of Archaeology, University of Kelaniya.
- Doctoral advisor: Paul Sinclair
- Other academic advisors: Senake Bandaranayake
- Website: rajsomadeva.com

Delgahawaththage Raj Kumar Somadeva (born 01 November 1960) is a Senior Professor in Archaeology at the Postgraduate Institute of Archaeology, University of Kelaniya in Sri Lanka, and a Senior Fellow of the Sri Lanka Council of Archaeologists. He has received the Charles Wallace Research Fellowship from the Institute of Archeology at University College London in 2005.

== Early life ==
Delgahawaththage Raj Kumar Somadeva was born on 01 November 1960 in Wellawaya, Sri Lanka. He is the eldest among a family of six children born to a Sinhala Family.

As his father was a government public servant, the family moved around the country, and he therefore had to switch schools regularly. As a result, he had attended Poojapitiya Madhya Maha Vidyalaya, Nivithigala Sumana Maha Vidyalaya, Ehaliyagoda Dharmapala Vidyalaya, Hidellana Sivali Madhya Maha Vidyalaya, Minuwangoda Nalanda Vidyalaya, Pitipana Roman Catholic Vidyalaya, Kalutara Holy Cross College and eventually Kalutara Vidyalaya.

== Higher education ==
He received his Bachelor of Arts degree in Archaeology in 1986, and in 1994 earned his Master of Philosophy degree in the same discipline, both from the University of Kelaniya. In 2006 he obtained his Doctor of Philosophy degree in Archaeology from the Department of Archaeology and Ancient History at Uppsala University in Sweden.

He is a student of Professor Senake Bandaranayake, and Professor Paul Sinclair at the Uppsala University.

== Career ==
Somadeva served as an Assistant Director of the Sigiriya - UNESCO - Sri Lanka Cultural Triangle Project from 1989 to 1994. During that period he also worked as the Field Director of the German-Sri Lanka collaboration excavation project and the Swedish-Sri Lanka Settlement archaeology project held in Sigiriya-Dambulla region.

He contributed his service as a member of the advisory committee to the Director General of Archaeology in Sri Lanka and to the Department of National Archives.

In 2013, he was appointed as a member of the National Research Council of Sri Lanka.

He also extended his capacity to revise the history teaching syllabuses in schools and has written several chapters to the current history textbooks.

As of 2022, he serves as a senior professor in archaeology at the Postgraduate Institute of Archaeology, University of Kelaniya.

In 2022, he was appointed as a member of the advisory committee to the Ministry of Tourism in Sri Lanka.

Currently, he is serving as a consultant to several projects funded by the UNDP.

== Research ==
Somadeva's main field of study is ancient urbanisation in Sri Lanka. He spent six years from 1999 to 2005 in the south and south-eastern part of Sri Lanka to understand the historical development of urbanism in that area which has been described in the national historical chronicles and the lithic inscriptions. During that period he undertook several macro-scale reconnaissance surveys and nine archaeological excavations in the Lower Kirindi Oya basin. The results of the fieldwork were presented to his doctoral degree at Uppsala University as his thesis, The Origins of Urbanism in Southern Sri Lanka.

After completing his PhD, he investigated the problems related to the pre and proto-historic transition in Sri Lanka. As a result of his fieldwork, he identified a new transitional phase in the later prehistory occupied by the advanced hunter-gatherers of the Holocene. Somadeva was able to explain how the late Holocene hunter-gatherers were resilient to climate change and how they adapted to floral resource exploitation for their survival. Now he is concerned to understand the cognitive advances of the advanced hunter-gatherers of the late Holocene in the country.

Somadeva won a Competitive Research Grant from the National Science Foundation in 2017 and 2019 for his research on Environmental adaptations of the Holocene hunter-gatherers in Sri Lanka.

He has published seventy-five research papers both locally and internationally, in addition to his seventeen books.

Somadeva considers that Buddhism existed in Sri Lanka before the arrival of Mahinda, and that the history of Sri Lanka goes beyond the period of Vijaya and Kuveni. This is contrary to the widely accepted view, which is that promoted by the 5th-century Mahawamsa.

== Recognition and honours ==
In 1998 he won the top ten in Sri Lanka Award for the category of Academic Leadership and Accomplishment.

In 2005 he was awarded the Charles Wallace Research Fellowship from the Institute of Archaeology at University College London.

He is also a member of the World Archaeological Congress.

His publication titled Rock Paintings and Engraving Sites in Sri Lanka won the State Literary Award for the Best Academic Publication in English, in the year 2013.

== Bibliography ==
=== Books ===
==== Author ====
1. පුරාවිද්‍යාවේ න්‍යායය, ක්‍රමවේද සහ භාවිතය (අනුවාදය) (in Sinhala). 2000.
2. Urban Origins in Southern Sri Lanka. Studies in global archaeology - 9. Dept. of Archaeology and Ancient History, Uppsala University. 2006. ISBN 9789197321259. OCLC 416723069.
3. රුහුණු පුරාණය (in Sinhala). 2009.
4. Somadeva, Raj (2010). Archaeology of the Uda Walave Basin. Colombo. ISBN 9789558522097. OCLC 801681807.
5. The Nilgiriseya Survey. Memoirs of the Postgraduate Institute of Archaeology. Postgraduate Institute of Archaeology, University of Kelaniya, Colombo. 2012. OCLC 820942684.
6. Somadeva, Raj (2012). Rock painting and engraving sites in Sri Lanka. Colombo. ISBN 9789558522127. OCLC 820122255.
7. Excavations at Manabharana Vihara at Siyambalanduva. Memoirs of the Archæological Survey of Ceylon. Colombo: Archaeological Survey Department of Sri Lanka. 2013. ISBN 9789559159841. OCLC 864400502.
8. ශ්‍රී ලංකාවේ ප්‍රාග් ඉතිහාසය (in Sinhala). 2015.
9. කල්තොට සමීක්ෂණය (in Sinhala). 2015.
10. ශ්‍රී ලංකාවේ ආදි ඉතිහාසය (in Sinhala). 2017.
11. පුරාවිද්‍යාත්මක න්‍යායයේ වර්ධනය (අනුවාදය) (in Sinhala). 2017.
12. Ancient Inscriptions in Ruhuna. 2021.
13. පුරාවිද්‍යාත්මක තැන්පතු සකස්වීමේ ක්‍රියාවලිය (අනුවාදය) (in Sinhala). 2021.
14. යක්ෂි: ඉතිහාසයේ ක්ෂිතිජ යා කිරීම (in Sinhala). Colombo: Gurulugomi. 2022. ISBN 9789559713418.

==== Co-author ====
1. Silva, Nimal De; Somadeva, Raj (2010). The Galpaya Survey. Postgraduage Institute of Archaeology, [University of Kelaniya]. ISBN 9789558522035. OCLC 316737991.
2. The archaeology of mountains : holocene adaptations of prehistoric hunter-gatherers. PGIAR occasional paper series. Postgraduate Institute of Archaeology, University of Kelaniya, Colombo. 2014. ISBN 9789559159841. OCLC 933446769.
3. Kaltota Survey - Phase 1. Memoirs of the Postgraduate Institute of Archaeology. Postgraduate Institute of Archaeology, University of Kelaniya, Colombo. 2015. OCLC 1014167181.
4. ඉපැරණි ලෝක ශිෂ්ටාචාර (in Sinhala). National Institute of Education, Colombo. 2016.

==== Editor ====
1. Galle Maritime Archaeology Museum and Information Centre. Colombo: Publication Unit, Central Cultural Fund. 2010. ISBN 9789556132311. OCLC 808597992.
2. Proceedings of the National Archaeological Symposium, 2014. Department of Archaeology, Ministry of National Heritage, Colombo. 2014. ISSN 2386-1290. OCLC 896637060.

=== Select papers, articles ===
==== Conference papers ====
1. A Comprative Study of Occlusal Dimensions of the Mandibul Molars in Prehistoric and Contermporary Populations in Sri Lanka. Annual Research Sessions. University of Perdeniya. October 30, 2002. p. 63.
2. An Odontometric Study of the Permanent molars of a prehistoric population who lived in a coastal region of Sri Lanka-Pallemalala. Anthropological Science. Vol. 111. ANTHROPOLOGICAL SOC NIPPON. January 1, 2003. p. 46.
3. Colonization of Time: Some Problems in Identification of Archaeological Sites in Sri Lanka. 10th International Conference on Sri Lanka Studies. University of Kelaniya. 2005. p. 9.
4. Long-term continuity or an abrupt change?: a new conceptual frontier of cultural development in early first millennium BCE in Sri Lanka. International Conference on Social Sciences, Sri Lanka. University of Kelaniya. 2008. p. 20.
5. Virtual Reconstruction and Visualization of Pre and Proto Historic Landscapes in Srilanka. 2011 International Conference on Biometrics and Kansei Engineering. IEEE. September 19, 2011. pp. 198–203.
6. Paths, Places and Voids: some thoughts on a prehistoric symbolic representation recovered from a cave in Sabaragamuva Province, Sri Lanka. The International Conference on Land Transportation, Locomotive Heritage and Road Culture-2017. 2017.

==== Chapters ====
1. "Ancient signs, symbols and metaphors: thinking on cognitive dimension of the un-deciphered images found in Sri Lanka". Hundred and Twenty-five Years Department of Archaeology. Department of Archaeology: 182–197. 2015.
2. "Giri Dīpa: The Earliest Buddhist Religious Landscapes in Sri Lanka?". A publication of commemorating International Vesak festival held in UNESCO Paris. 2015. pp. 83–104.
3. "Prelude to the State : further thinking on the formation of early political institutions in Sri Lanka". Professor R. A. L. H. Gunawardhana Felicitation Volume. Colombo: Godage. 2017.
4. "Before Buddhism: some thoughts on transcendental beliefs in early Sri Lanka". Buddha Rashmi Vesak Volume Essays in Buddhism and Buddhist Monastic Archaeology. Central Cultural Fund, Colombo, Sri Lanka. 2017. pp. 43–58. doi:10.4324/9781003219873-6. ISBN 9781003219873. S2CID 238683737.
5. "Cultural Dynamism Prehistoric Hunter-Gatherers in Mid/Late Holocene Sri Lanka". The Resilience of Heritage Cultivating a Future of the Past Essays in Honour of Professor paul J.J. Sinclair. Uppsala University. 2018. pp. 225–252.
6. "Peripheral City of Māgama: A case of tropical urbanism in Sri Lanka". Exploring South Asian Urbanity. Routledge India. September 20, 2021. pp. 76–100. doi:10.4324/9781003219873-6. ISBN 9781003219873. S2CID 238683737.

==== Articles ====
1. "The Beliyakanda, Kaluarachchigama and Neeravva stone inscriptions". The Settlement Archaeology of the Sigiriya-Dambulla Region: 195–200. 1990.
2. සීගිරිය දඹුල්ල ප්‍රදේශයේ ශිලා ලේඛන (විශ්ලේෂණාත්මක අධ්‍යයනයකි) (PDF) (in Sinhala). 1992.
3. "The Development of Sri Lankan Epigraphy: A Summary" (PDF). Vidyodaya Journal of Humanities and Social Sciences. 8 (1–2). 1997.
4. "The Archaeology of Southern Sri Lanka: Human Responses and Contributions to Environmental Change in Sri Lanka" (PDF). Arkeologi och antik historia. December 7, 2004.
5. "Andhra-Sri Lanka sub-system: Probably another way of thinking". Journal of Indian Ocean Archaeology. 2. Indian Archaeological Society: 8–20. November 2, 2005.
6. Somadeva, Raj; Ranasinghe, Sudevi (December 1, 2006). "An Excavation of a Shell-midden at Pallemalla in Southern Littoral area of Sri Lanka: Some Evidence of Prehistoric Chenier Occupation in c. 4th millennium BC". Ancient Asia. 1. Ubiquity Press: 15–24. doi:10.5334/aa.06103.
7. Somadeva, R. (2008). "පථය, පරිශ්‍රය සහ ජනාවාසය: පුරා විද්‍යාත්මක ස්ථාන හඳුනාගැනීම සහ අර්ථ දැක්වීම් පිළිබඳ ගැටලු කිහිපයක්". සංස්කෘතිය, දේශපාලනය හා ශ්‍රී ලංකාවේ අනාගතය, සරසවි - 4, සමාජීය විද්‍යා ශාස්ත්‍රීය ලිපි සංග්‍රහය (in Sinhala). University of Kelaniya.
8. "A Probe to Locate Kerala's Early Historic Trade Emporium of Nelcynda". Journal of Indian Ocean Archaeology (5): 195–200. 2008.
9. "Visualization and Haptic rendering of Ancient Woodcarvings in Sri Lanka". International Society for Geometry and Graphics. August 5, 2010.
10. "Walking Ladder: A Brief Survey on the Development of Cultural Chronology in Sri Lanka". Nimal de Silva Felicitation Volume. University of Moratuwa: 171–178. March 1, 2015.
11. "Jhaya and Bariya: A Case in the Early Bráhmí Inscriptions of Sri Lanka" (PDF). Vidyodaya: Journal of Humanities and Social Sciences. 4 (1). University of Sri Jayawardenepura: 41–57. 2017.
12. Somadeva, R.; Wannirrayaka, A.; Devage, D.; Ambalampitiya, J. (2017). "Clay Working and Basketry: New Materiality of Hunter-gatherer/Foragers in mid/late Holocene Sri Lanka". Rajarata University of Sri Lanka. Rajarata University of Sri Lanka, Department of Archaeology and Heritage Management.
13. "Archaeology of Disorder: a site-specific surface study at a newly discovered ancient mound in Sabaragamuva Province, Sri Lanka". Roland Silva Felicitation Volume. Colombo 7: Post Graduate Institute of Archaeology, University of Kelaniya. 2018.
14. "A Review of Rock art studies in Sri Lanka". Expression - Cultural Changes Part II. 2019. pp. 70–85. ISSN 2499-1341.
15. Rock Paintings & Engraving in Sri Lanka
