= Sooriyakanda mass grave =

The Sooriyakanda mass grave is the mass burial ground of murdered school children from Embilipitiya Maha Vidyalaya (Embilipitiya High School) in Sri Lanka. These school children were killed and buried as part of the counterinsurgency during the second JVP uprising in Sri Lanka. It was alleged that over 300 bodies were buried in the location. The mass grave was located in 1994. The Sri Lankan government last reported in 1996 to have conducted a forensic analysis of the burial ground uncovering an unspecified number of bodies. Local media, NGOs and the US state department have claimed that the investigations are not satisfactory.

== Background ==
During the 1987 to 1989 period, as the war in the north became more intense, there was a marked shift in the ideology and goals of the Janatha Vimukthi Peramuna (JVP) party in Sri Lanka. It morphed from a Marxist organization into a Sinhalese nationalist organization opposing any compromise with the Tamil insurgency. Due to its alleged role in anti-Tamil riots of July 1983, although the government supplied no evidence to support this allegation, it was banned and its leadership went underground.

The group's activities intensified against the then government in the second half of 1987 in the wake of the Indo-Sri Lankan Accord to resolve the ethnic conflict. During 1987 a new group, the Deshapremi Janatha Viyaparaya (DJV), emerged. It was an offshoot of the JVP. The DJV claimed responsibility for the August 1987 assassination attempts on the president Premadasa and prime minister. In addition, the group launched a campaign of intimidation against the ruling United National Party (UNP) party, killing more than seventy members of Parliament between July and November 1987.

The JVP seriously misjudged its own strength when, through the DJV, it called for the killing of members of the families of army personnel. This destroyed the small but significant amount of support that it enjoyed among the lower ranks of the armed forces, and made it possible for the government to justify its campaign of terror. As a means of pacifying the support base of JVP, a wide range of acts of cruelty, including the torture and mass murder of school children, who were allegedly JVP supporters, was carried out by the state.

== Investigation ==
In 1994, after a request by the United Nations (UN) regarding the mass graves, the Government reported that an excavation of the graves had been carried out on 14 September 1994 under the supervision of the High Court and it resulted in the discovery of an unspecified number of skeletal remains.

The report also indicated that a team of forensic, investigative and legal experts helped the court, in order to ensure a proper and scientific excavation and to assist in the further discovery and identification of bodies and the investigation of the circumstances in which they were buried at Sooriyakanda. The Government also reported that it has started to investigate newly discovered graves, including one at Ankumbura which may contain the bodies of 36 people killed by the police in 1989.

== Follow up ==
Local newspapers, including The Island and the Sunday Times, have reported that, although the People's Alliance party had come to power in 1993, promising to investigate alleged atrocities conducted during the previous 18 years of United National Party (UNP) rule, including the Sooriyakanada mass graves, nothing had come of the efforts. Another report indicated that officers initially indicted of the crime were honorably discharged as soon as hostilities with the rebel Liberation Tigers of Tamil Eelam (LTTE) began.

Notable international jurist Neelan Thiruchelvam, in a speech at the ICES-Colombo, indicated that the appropriate investigations into massacres and disappearances of civilians, including many children in the Sathurukondan, Eastern University, Mylanthanai and the mass murder and burial of school children at Sooriyakanda, were being hampered by the adoption of emergency regulations, which were contributing to a climate of impunity. He called for the partial, if not complete, revocation of emergency regulation so that an impartial inquiry into these incidents could take place.

The United States State Department noted in 1996 and 1998 that no significant headway had been made by the Sri Lankan government with regard to investigations into the mass graves at Sooriyakanda, Ankumbura and Nikaweratiya.

== See also ==
Other notable mass graves in Sri Lanka

- Chemmani mass grave
- Mirusuvil mass grave
- Duraiappa stadium mass grave
