= Lucius Afranius (poet) =

1st-century BC Roman comic poet

Lucius Afranius was an ancient Roman comic poet who lived at the beginning of the 1st century BC.

== Life ==
Afranius' comedies described Roman scenes and manners (the genre called comoediae togatae) and the subjects were mostly taken from the life of the lower classes (comoediae tabernariae). They were considered by some ancients to be frequently polluted with disgraceful amours, which, according to Quintilian, were only a representation of the conduct of Afranius. He depicted, however, Roman life with such accuracy that he is classed with Menander, from whom indeed he borrowed largely. He imitated the style of Gaius Titius, and his language is praised by Cicero. His comedies are spoken of in the highest terms by the ancient writers, and under the Empire they not only continued to be read, but were even acted, of which an example occurs in the time of Nero. They seem to have been well known even at the latter end of the 4th century AD.

== Quintilian's judgement ==
The Spanish-Roman teacher of rhetoric Quintilian wrote of Afranius's plays:

Togātīs excellit Afrānius: utinam non inquināsset argūmenta puerōrum foedīs amōribus, mōrēs suōs fassus.
("Afranius excelled in Roman-style comedies: if only he hadn't polluted his plots with unseemly sexual affairs with boys, confessing his own habits.")

Such is the generally accepted interpretation of this sentence. An alternative view is proposed by Welsh (2010), who, noting that there is no trace of pederasty or any lewdness in any of the quoted fragments of Afranius, proposed to translate the sentence "if only he hadn't polluted his plots with disreputable love affairs (conducted) by boys", something which Quintilian perhaps thought unsuited to the moralising tone of Roman comedies. A problem with this interpretation, as Welsh himself admits, is that in Roman literature the word pueri is usually used for the boys who are object of love affairs, not the young men who conduct them.

== Surviving titles and fragments ==
Afranius wrote many comedies. The titles of forty-two of his plays are still preserved, along with associated fragments and quotations:

- Abducta (Abducted Woman)
- Aequales (Just Alike)
- Auctio (Auction)
- Augur (The Augur)
- Brundisiae (Women from Brundisium)
- Cinerarius (Male Hair-Curler)
- Compitalia (The Compitalia Festival)
- Consobrini (Cousins)
- Crimen (Crime)
- Deditio (The Surrender)
- Depositum (Deposit)
- Divortium (Divorce)
- Emancipatus (The Emancipated Man)
- Epistula (The Letter)
- Exceptus
- Fratriae (Sisters-in-Law)
- Incendium (Fire)
- Inimici (Enemies)
- Libertus (Freedman)
- Mariti (Married Couple)
- Matertertae (Maternal Aunts)
- Megalensia (The Megalensia Festival)
- Omen (The Omen)
- Pantelius
- Pompa (Procession, or Parade)
- Privignus (The Stepson)
- Prodigus (The Prodigal)
- Proditus (The Betrayed Man)
- Promus (The Steward)
- Prosa
- Purgamentum (Filth)
- Repudiatus (The Divorced Man)
- Sella (The Chair)
- Simulans (The Pretender)
- Sorores (Sisters)
- Suspecta (The Suspected Woman)
- Talio (Retaliation)
- Temerarius (The Thoughtless Man)
- Thais (Thais)
- Titulus (Notice of Sale)
- Virgo (Virgin)
- Vopiscus (Surviving Twin)
