= Mirusuvil massacre =

2000 Massacre in Mirusuvil, Sri Lanka

- Location: 9°40′0″N 80°14′0″E; Mirusuvil, Jaffna district, Sri Lanka
- Date: December 20, 2000
- Target: Sri Lankan Tamil civilians
- Attack type: Stabbing
- Weapon: Knife
- Deaths: 8
- Perpetrator: Sri Lanka Army
- Convicted: Sunil Rathnayake

Mirusuvil massacre refers to the massacre and subsequent mass burial of eight Sri Lankan Tamil civilians on 20 December 2000.

== The Massacre ==
The Mirusuvil massacre happened on 20 December 2000, when eight internally displaced refugees returning to inspect their property were arrested on 19 December 2000 in a village named Mirusuvil close to Jaffna.

They were subsequently murdered by Sri Lankan Army soldiers and buried in a mass grave, about 16 miles east of Jaffna town.

The refugees had returned from Udupiddy, further north. They returned to Mirusuvil on 19 December to inspect their houses and to collect firewood, when they were seized by the Army. The refugees had obtained permission from local authorities before visiting their former properties.

One of the arrested, Ponnuthurai Maheswaran allegedly escaped from Army custody with serious injuries and informed relatives. Major Sydney de Soyza who headed the military police in the Jaffna region received orders from Brigadier Thoradeniya on 23 December to launch an investigation. Major Soyza led a military investigation and accompanied Maheswaran to the site where they discovered blood-like stains on a concrete slab covering a cesspit which when removed revealed parts of an animal. A nearby building occupied by a unit of the army was led by Sergeant Ranasinghe. According to Major Soyza, Maheshwaran identified two of the soldiers who came with Sergeant Ranasinghe were the soldiers who restrained and assaulted him. These two were identified as Lance Corporal Rathnayake and Private Mahinda Kumarasinghe. Major Soyza took five soldiers including Rathnayake and Kumarasinghe into custody. The site was then put on guard by the Military Police personnel while the Police were informed. A police force headed by Senior Superintendent of Police Kankesanthurai arrived on the scene followed by the Magistrate who ordered the police to dig. In the process 8 bodies were recovered. The location was discovered based on information collected by Major Soyza from Rathnayake.

According to the evidence of District Medical Officer, Dr. C. Kathirvetpillai, their throats had been slashed. The dead included three teenagers and five-year-old Vilvarajah Prasath One of the arrested, Ponnuthurai Maheswaran allegedly escaped from Army custody with serious injuries and informed relatives. Eventually the Sri Lankan government charged five Sri Lankan Army soldiers with illegal arrests, torture, murder and burial of their dead bodies in a mass grave.

== Reactions ==
In a letter to the then President Chandrika Kumaratunga, the local member of parliament Mavai Senathirajah said that a woman's body was seen partially buried in the area, leading to suspicions that there were other mass graves. He urged the president to order further excavations in Mirusuvil.

Human rights groups such as Center for Human Rights Development (CHRD) along with other civilian groups initiated a campaign and demanded the government to arrest the murderers and as a result 14 Sri Lanka Army Soldiers were taken into custody. They were produced before the Magistrate in Chavakachcheri, located in Jaffna district and remanded. CHRD lawyer Mr. M. Remadious was instrumental in participating in legal proceedings against the suspects and also met and interviewed the relatives of the victims to collect more information.

The case was then transferred to the Magistrate Court in Anuradhapura and was taken up on 20 May 2002. Attorney General then nominated three Judges to hear the case at Trial at Bar, High court, Colombo on 27 November 2002. Group of volunteer lawyers took care of the interests of the victim's families and key witnesses.

Later the case was referred to the Colombo High Court and it longed for about 13 years.

== Case follow up ==
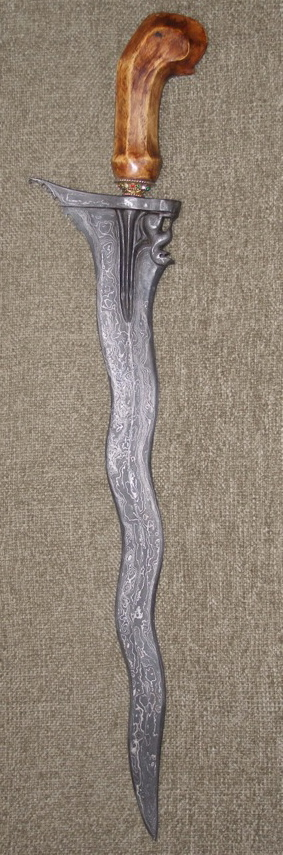
A typical Kris knife

The government in 2002 agreed to try the arrested army officers without a jury. During the proceedings of the court case the main witness in the court case was quoted as saying that:

[H]e was caught by some army personnel armed with weapons while he was collecting firewood with other villagers. He said the army men ordered them to put down the knives and started to assault them. Later he was blindfolded with his own sarong and taken near a toilet pit where another soldier was waiting with a kris knife. He described that there were blood stains at the place. While the army men were talking, the main witness Ponnadurai Maheshwaran had managed to escape by running away from the place....

Although the case was still being heard in 2005, Human rights agencies have complained of delays in hearing of this and other human rights related cases.

== Death Sentence ==
Initially 14 Soldiers were taken into custody and later nine of them were acquitted from all charges. But after Attorney General had filed charges against 5 soldiers in connection with this case.

After about 13 years of the case, the first accused army Staff Sergeant Sunil Ratnayake was found guilty for the murder of eight civilians in Mirusuvil, Jaffna has been sentenced to death by the Colombo High Court on 25 June 2015. He was found guilty of 15 offences. However, four other soldiers were acquitted as there was insufficient evidence to connect them to the murders.

== Pardon ==
In January 2020 it was alleged by opposition MP Ajith Perera that Sunil Ratnayake who was on death row over the massacre was going to be pardoned and "applauded" the move. On 26 March 2020 Ratnanayake was granted a full presidential pardon which was condemned by human rights groups and the Tamil National Alliance. However Ajith P Perera's official Twitter account replying to a tweet by Sumanthiran clarified that the original comment was meant to be sarcastic and condemned the release. Former Army Commander Sarath Fonseka also criticised the decision claiming that the military should never show mercy to soldiers who committed murder.

== Notes ==
- Internally displaced: Sri Lanka has many people who are internally displaced due to the effect of the Sri Lankan civil war since 1983 and the 2004 Tsunami. They live in refugee camps and resettlement villages unable to go back to their original place of residence due to security concerns and lack of infrastructure. Most are looked after by a combination of help from the local communities, the government, NGO's and international aid agencies such as UNHCR.
- Disappearances: More than 700 people disappeared in Jaffna from 1996 to 1997. The Sri Lankan government has said that 765 complaints of disappearance had been received. Sixteen people were ascertained as killed in custody and 201 were said to be in prisons. The fate of 548 remains unknown. The UN Working Group on Disappearances urged the government in March, to abolish the Prevention of Terrorism Act and the Emergency regulations which facilitate disappearances.

== See also ==
- List of attacks on civilians attributed to Sri Lankan government forces
