= List of Intangible Cultural Heritage elements in Azerbaijan =

UNESCO's list of intangible cultural heritage from Azerbaijan includes twenty-three elements: twenty-one of them were included in the "Representative List of the Intangible Cultural Heritage of Humanity", and two (the Chovgan horse-riding game played with the Karabakh horse and the traditional group dances of Nakhchivan – yalli, kochari, tanzera) were included in the "Intangible Cultural Heritage in Need of Urgent Protection". No examples from Azerbaijan were included in the "Register of Good Safeguarding Practices". The Azerbaijani mugham, the first sample from Azerbaijan to be added to the list of intangible cultural heritage of UNESCO, was included in the list in 2008.

The concept of intangible cultural heritage is regulated by the Convention on the Safeguarding of Intangible Cultural Heritage, which was adopted at the 32nd session of UNESCO in Paris in 2003 and entered into force in 2006. The inclusion of new heritage elements in UNESCO's lists of intangible cultural heritage is determined by the Intergovernmental Committee for the Safeguarding of Intangible Cultural Heritage established by the convention. According to UNESCO, intangible cultural heritage includes holidays, festivals, performances, oral traditions, music and handicrafts.

UNESCO intangible cultural heritage elements selected from Azerbaijan are taken in the "Europe and North America" category. Eleven of Azerbaijan's heritage elements are unique to Azerbaijan, and twelve are multinational. Countries with shared multi-ethnic heritage patterns are from West and Central Asia. Iran, Turkey and Kazakhstan are the countries with the most examples of shared heritage with Azerbaijan.

Some cultural elements are exclusive to certain Azerbaijani localities (Nakhchivan, Basqal, Lahic, Goychay, Shaki). Particularly, the Ismailli district is the one with the greatest amount of cultural treasures (Basqal pottery and Lahic copper art).

The first element, Azerbaijani mugham, was included into the list in 2008.

== Intangible Cultural Heritage of Humanity ==
Legend and domains:

+ Transnational element
KP Knowledge and practices concerning nature and the universe
OT Oral traditions and expressions
PA Performing arts
SR Social practices, rituals and festive events
TC Traditional craftsmanship

=== Representative List ===
Name (date)	D.	Description	Image	Registration	
Name (date)	D.	Description	Image	UNESCO	National
Azerbaijani Mugham (2008)	PA	Mugham is the classical musical and poetic art of Azerbaijanis. Until the 19th century, mugham art developed in the palaces of feudal lords, and later in literary and musical gatherings. The Azerbaijani mugham currently includes of seven primary mughams (Rast, Shur, Segah, Chahargah, Bayaty-Shiraz, Shushtar, Humayun, and Kurd-Ovshari), as well as percussion mughams (Heyraty, Arazbari, Samayi-Shams, Mansuriyya, Mani, Ovshari, Heydari, Kara (Mahur-Hindi, Orta Mahur, Bayaty-Qajar, Dughah). In Azerbaijan, a mugham trio made up of performers of the tar, kamancha, and gaval is typically used to accompany mugham performances. The tasnif can be done either before or after the mugham. Ghazals make up the majority of the texts for the classifications, while couplets, garayli, bayati, and other syllable-weighted poetry may also be utilized. The classifications cover topics such as love songs, societal issues, and Azerbaijani culture. Related topics: Sufism, religious experience etc. Biome: mountain, urban places Risk Factors: rapid socio-cultural changes		00039	FM0300000001
Art of Azerbaijani Ashiq (2009)	OT; PA; TC	Ashik art is a continuation of the minstrels' history and is a synthesis of poetry, narrative, dance, and vocal instrumental music. In the past, ashiks wrote poems in the style of epics, fairy stories, lyrical and satirical songs about love, beautifications, master poems, mukhammas, dubeyt, and dodagdymez while performing in teahouses, caravanserais, and market squares. Ashiq music spread in Ganja (north-west, Tovuz, Gazakh), Karabakh and Nakhchivan regions of Azerbaijan, as well as in Salyan, Tabriz, Garadag, Maragha, Khoy and Urmia regions of South Azerbaijan. (Note: The music of the ashyg is mainly to be found in the south, above all in the Kirovabad (north-east, Tauus, Kazakh), Karabakh and Nakhcivan (south-west) districts of Azerbaijan as well as in Salyany (south-west) and in Azeri Iran in Tabriz, Karadagh, Maraghe, Khoy and as far as Orumïye (Rezaye). In certain regions such as Ganja both traditions exist alongside each other. Ashyg tend to perform in rural and provincial regions. Mugam, by contrast, has a largely urban audience. Apart from gatherings of experts, the festivities which are organized at weddings (toj) are preferred opportunities for performance in both genres.) Tariyel Mammadov mentions the names of eleven Ashiq schools: Goyche, Tovuz, Borchali, Ganja-Shamkir, Shirvan, Karabakh, Garadag, Tabriz, Urmiya, Childir and Derbent. Related topics: Nomad, Storytelling etc. Risk Factors: Migration to cities from villages		00253	FM0100000001
Nawrouz, Novruz, Nowrouz, Nowrouz, Nawrouz, Nauryz, Nooruz, Nowruz, Navruz, Nevruz, Nowruz, Navruz (2009) + (Note: Shared with Afghanistan, India, Iran, Iraq, Kazakhstan, Kyrgyzstan, Mongolia, Pakistan, Tajikistan, Turkey, Turkmenistan, and Uzbekistan.) (See also: Nowruz in Azerbaijan)	KP; OT; PA; SR; TC	The Nowruz celebration honors the beginning of a new year and the regeneration of the natural world. Kosa and Kekal are two of the holiday's most well-known heroes. During the celebrations held over the holidays, jugglers demonstrate their skills and various performances are given. People build bonfires in the streets in the nights and leap over them while chanting, "May my struggles and successes be poured into the fire, may it be burnt in the fire." On holidays, they prepare pilaf, shakerbura, baklava, and gogal at home. During the holiday, they also fight eggs and sprout malt. On the table is placed a festive khoncha decorated with candles. Everyone should spend the holiday at home with their family. Before the holiday, Wednesdays named after four elements are held. Related Topics: Celebrating the New Year, fertility ritual, etc.		02097	DB0102000001
Traditional art of Azerbaijani carpet weaving in the Republic of Azerbaijan (2010)	OT; SR; TC	Groups of carpets from Azerbaijan include those from Absheron, Ganja, Gazakh, Shirvan, Karabakh, Guba, and Tabriz. The Safavids' rise to power in the 16th century marked the beginning of carpet weaving's unmatched perfection and rise to industrial significance in Azerbaijan. The main region for the production of Caucasian carpets was Azerbaijan, and the ideas and weaving prowess of Azerbaijani weavers were felt all throughout the Caucasus. The intricate geometric designs found in Guba, Shirvan, and Gazakh carpets, which feature animal and human schematic figures positioned along the same axis in the center of polygonal or star-shaped medallions, are their defining feature. Karabakh carpets are distinguished by their numerous flower themes and various plant embellishments. Among the geometric shapes seen in Azerbaijani carpets are the swastika, which goes back to the historical beliefs of polytheism, and the octagonal star surrounded by rhombuses and squares. Later, under the influence of Tabriz culture, elements of the plant world appear in other schools. Related Topics: Azerbaijani mythology, natural dyes etc. Bioms: Agroecosystem		00389	SD0100000001
Craftsmanship and performance art of the Tar, a long-necked string musical instrument (2012)	PA; TC	Tar is the main musical instrument of Mugham triads in Azerbaijani folklore orchestras and ensembles, and played an important role in the formation of the cultural identity of Azerbaijanis. Tar has been popular in Azerbaijan since the 18th century. Azerbaijan tar was created in the 19th century by Mirza Sadiq and swiftly gained popularity in Iran, Azerbaijan, Armenia, Georgia, and, after some time, Dagestan, Turkey, Turkmenistan, Tajikistan, and Uzbekistan. The bowl part of the tar is made of mulberry wood, the handle is made of walnut wood, and the head part is made of pear wood.The art of making tar is frequently passed down to family members who work as apprentices. There are currently numerous such masters in Baku and the country's surrounding areas. Bioms: pastures, mountains		00671	ST0803000001
Traditional art and symbolism of Kelaghayi, making and wearing women’s silk headscarves (2014)	KP; SR; TC	Kalagayi is a square-shaped headdress woven from silk thread belonging to women in Azerbaijan. The art of making kalaghayi, whose origins go back to traditions along the Great Silk Road, is being developed in the city of Shaki and Basgal. This process includes cloth weaving, painting, and decoration using wooden molds. Since the art of making kalagai is passed down within the family, each family has its own characteristics and ornaments. The color of pumpkins has a symbolic meaning and should be appropriate for weddings, funerals, daily activities and participation in events. Geographical indicators: yalkhi ispirak kelagayi, duvag kelagayi, Heirati kelagayi, 7-colors kelagayi, Abbasali kelagayi Related topics: illustration printing, natural dyes, etc. Bioms: Agroecosystem, Mountain,		00669	SD0302000001
Copper craftsmanship of Lahij (2015)	KP; SR; TC	Lahıc settlement has been famous for coppersmithing, tableware and weapon decoration for a long time. LLahij tableware spread in the Caucasus, Persia and Asia Minor. The development of coppersmithing in Lahij affected the structure of the settlement and the daily life of the residents, and led to the development of about forty types of crafts and auxiliary fields in the 19th century. At the end of the 19th century, the import of cheap Russian products led to a decrease in the number of copper workshops. However, despite this, the traditions of this type of craftsmanship have survived to this day. Related Topics: Engraving, Furniture etc. Bioms: mountain, urban places		00675	ST0702000001
Flatbread making and sharing culture: Lavash, Katyrma, Jupka, Yufka (2016) + (Note: Shared with Iran, Kazakhstan, Kyrgyzstan, and Turkey. Lavash is the name used in Azerbaijan. Katyrma, jupka, and yufka are the names used in the other countries.)	KP; OT; SR	Lavash is one of the most common types of bread in Azerbaijan. The word lavash is used in the sense of "thin bread". This type of bread is baked on a tava. When the bride comes home after the wedding in Sabirabad region, the mother-in-law throws lavash on the bride's shoulder: "Blessings come to this house with you, may your feet fall." After mourning in Novkhani, sometimes "kulche", lavash with halva is served. In Erzurum, taking into account the fact that lavash is also prepared in Azerbaijan, the expression "acem bread" (Turkish: acem ekmeği) is used. Related Topics: nomad, fertility ritual, commemoration of the dead, etc. Bioms: Agroecosystem, urban places		01181	ST0901000002
Dolma making and sharing tradition, a marker of cultural identity (2017)	KP; SR	There are different types of Azerbaijani dolma according to the material in which the minced meat is wrapped (leaf stuffing, stuffed sorrel, cabbage roll, eggplant stuffing, plantain stuffing), as well as the characteristics of the prepared stuffing (false stuffing, wonderful stuffing, etc.). In Azerbaijan, dolma is divided into two groups: leaves and stuffing. Leaf stuffing is made by wrapping the filling in various vegetable leaves. Grape leaves, as well as mulberry leaves, plantains, pip (peanuts), zikh (sorrel, sorrel), quince, and cabbage leaves are used for this purpose. Stuffed dumplings are made by filling vegetables or fruits with stuffing. Tomato, sweet pepper, eggplant, apple, quince, borage, cucumber, onion, etc. are included in this dish. It refers to the types of stuffing. In addition, the stuffing of the dolman is cucurbita stuffing (made from cucurbita filled with filling), mushroom stuffing (stuffing is made from cheese and crumbled bread), quince stuffing (stuffing is made from meat, quince, chestnut, salt and herbs), cucumber stuffing, potato stuffing, onion stuffing although there are types, they are characteristic of certain regions. Geographical indications: lemon stuffed, dry stuffed, white egg stuffed, olive stuffed, kira stuffed, walnut filling, apple stuffed, fish stuffed, pip stuffed, guba stuffed Related topics: hospitality, gender distribution of work, etc. Bioms: agroecosystem, mountains, urban places		01188	ST0902040001
Art of crafting and playing with Kamantcheh/Kamancha, a bowed string musical instrument (2017) + (Note: Shared with Iran.)	PA; TC	Kamancha is the main element of Azerbaijani classical music and Azerbaijani folk music. The art of playing kamancha plays an important role in social and cultural gatherings. According to the Encyclopædia Iranica, Azerbaijani musical art was performed in other regions of the Caucasus, especially among Armenians who mastered the mugham system and stringed musical instruments such as tar and kamanchah. (Note: Azeri art music is also played in other regions of the Caucasus, especially among the Armenians, who have adopted the system of maqām and the instruments kamāṇča and tār.) Related topics: epic poetry, hospitality, etc. Bioms: agroecosystem, urban places		01286	ST0803000002
Heritage of Dede Qorqud/Korkyt Ata/Dede Korkut, epic culture, folk tales and music (2018) + (Note: Shared with Kazakhstan and Turkey.)	OT; PA; SR	The Dede Gorgud saga is about the wars "against the infidels" in the Caucasian lands captured by the Oghuz Bahadirs. Although its origin is Central Asia, it was formed in the territory of Azerbaijan, where the Oghuz are densely populated. The last form of the saga was written in the 15th century in the territory of modern Azerbaijan. The epic is written in Azerbaijani in the Dresden manuscript and Anatolian Turkish in the Vatican copy. There are fantastic motifs of Azerbaijani fairy tales along the border. The theme of the Dede Gorgud saga has been used in Azerbaijani literature, theater and cinematography. In 2018, the third copy of the Dede Gorgud epic was written in the dialect of South Azerbaijan, especially Tabriz. It belongs to the 17th–18th centuries. Related Topics: nomad, Mythology of Azerbaijan etc. Bioms: agroecosystem, mountains		01399	FL0104010003
Nar Bayrami, traditional pomegranate festivity and culture (2020)	KP; OT; PA; SR; TC	Pomegranate Day is a holiday that celebrates the traditional use and symbolic meaning of the pomegranate product in Goychay district every year in October–November. Pomegranate cultivation is not only a source of inspiration for culinary arts, but also for handicrafts, decorative arts, legends, storytelling and other creative fields. Both the pomegranate and the holiday itself serve a variety of cultural and social functions, from traditional food to poetry. Symbolically, the pomegranate is associated with long-lasting fertility and abundance, and is considered a source of energy. In Azerbaijani legends, pomegranate is a symbol of love and desire. Pomegranate holiday was celebrated in Moscow on the initiative of cultural autonomy of Moscow Azerbaijanis. Related Topics: Myths, storytelling etc. Bioms: agroecosystem, mountain		01511	
Art of miniature (2020) + (Note: Shared with Iran, Turkey, and Uzbekistan.)	KP; TC	In the middle of the 15th century, the "Turkmen" style of the Tabriz miniature school, which was widespread in the territory of the Qara Qoyunlu and later Aq qoyunlu states, appeared. Many miniature examples of this style appeared not only in Tabriz, but also in some medieval cities located in the territory of modern Azerbaijan, in Shamakhi, the capital of the Shirvanshah state (Shamakhi anthology manuscript, 1468, British Museum, London). In the Middle Ages, book illustration was a traditional art in Azerbaijan. The famous miniaturists of the 19th century, Avazali Mughani ("Kalila and Dimna", 1809), Mirza Aligulu ("Shahnameh", 1850), Najafgulu Shamakhili ("Yusuf and Zulaikha", 1887) continued this art. The book miniatures of artist Mir Mohsen Nawab have reached our time. The most famous of them are the five miniatures he painted in 1864 for "Bahr ul-hazan" ("Sea of Sorrow"). Miniature art continued during the Soviet and independence periods. Related topics: dying technology, handwritings etc.		01598	SV0400000001
Pehlevanliq culture: traditional zorkhana games, sports and wrestling (2022)	PA; SR; TC	In the second half of the 18th century, all Azerbaijani khanates had wrestlers whom ordinary people called expensive. The games performed by the wrestlers include hand shows (chest game, picking up certain objects from the ground with teeth, etc.), yekba played with puduk stones, and elements of dancing on a string. After Iran, Azerbaijan is the second place where violence is spread. In Azerbaijan, zorkhana is a series of complex games ("sino game" or "sword fighting", "mil game", "foot button", "kebbada" or "fiddle", "sangi-stone throwing", "wheel", or "tanduvr", "wrestling" or "wrestling"). One of the oldest zoorkhaneh in Azerbaijan is the 15th century Icherisheher zoorkhaneh in Baku. From the 19th century, prisons were built in the cities of Ganja, Shusha, Sheki, Nakhchivan, and Shirvan. Over time, the zorkhana lost its status as a school where military methods were taught, and took on a ceremonial character. In the national wrestling of Azerbaijan, holding onto the legs and pants is widespread, and the tricks of the stick, hook, mill, and throw are allowed. To warm up for the fight, the wrestlers greet each other and go to opposite sides of the mat with dance steps. At the same time, they make hand movements: one hand first goes up, then down, the other first goes down, then up, and then the movements are reversed. After the referee's whistle, the fight begins and the competitors greet each other in the center of the mat. The battle is carried out to the accompaniment of trumpets and drums.		01703	DA0104000004; FO0105000003; FO0105000002; FO0105000005; FO0105000006; FO0105000004
Culture of Çay (tea), a symbol of identity, hospitality and social interaction (2022) + (Note: Shared with Turkey.) (See also: Tea culture in Azerbaijan)	KP; OT; SR; TC	Azerbaijan is considered a traditionally tea-drinking country in the Caucasus. It is a tradition to bring tea to the table before the main meal. Jam, sugar or sweets are served with the tea. Tea is considered a symbol of hospitality and respect for the guest. There is always a teahouse in any residence in Azerbaijan. There people discuss the happenings, read newspapers and play backgammon.		01685	DB0201000001
Telling tradition of Nasreddin Hodja/ Molla Nesreddin/ Molla Ependi/ Apendi/ Afendi Kozhanasyr Anecdotes (2022) + (Note: Shared with Kazakhstan, Kyrgyzstan, Tajikistan, Turkey, Turkmenistan, and Uzbekistan. Molla Nasreddin is the name used in Azerbaijan. Nasreddin Hodja, Molla Ependi, Apendi, and Afendi Kozhanasyr are the names used in the other countries.)	OT; PA; SR	Molla Nasreddin's anecdotes have been known in Azerbaijan for many years and have been written down since the 19th century. "Molla Nəsrəddin" satirical magazine was published by Azerbaijani writers in 1906–1932. According to tradition in Azerbaijan, the person who mentions Molla Nasreddin's name must tell his seven anecdotes, and those who listen to him must continue to do so.		01705	FL0108020001
Sericulture and traditional production of silk for weaving (2022) + (Note: Shared with Afghanistan, Iran, Tajikistan, Turkey, Turkmenistan, and Uzbekistan.) (See also: Silk industry in Azerbaijan)	KP; OT; SR; TC	The silk industry has existed in Azerbaijan since ancient times. Shirvan was the most important center of silk production in Azerbaijan. The population of Shamakhi, Basgal, Ganja, Sheki and Shusha engaged in silk farming.		01890	DA0104000012; SD0700000001
Craftsmanship and performing art of balaban/mey (2023) + (Note: Shared with Turkey. Balaban in Azerbaijan, mey in Turkey.)	KP; PA; SR; TC	Balaban is used both in ashiq music and mugham art. According to musicologist Gubad Gasimov, a wind musical instrument made of bone, which can be considered the prototype of the modern balaban, was discovered in Mingachevir territory of the 1st century BC. Among the music sent into space by the Voyager 1 ship in 1977, the Azerbaijani mugham performed by the balaban was also included.		01704	ST0802000004
Craftsmanship of mother of pearl inlay (2023) + (Note: Shared with Turkey.)	KP; TC	The method of "carving" is used in art of inlay. The inlayt method is used to decorate musical instruments in professions such as saz and tar. Musical instruments such as tar, saz, kamancha, tambourine, drum, dagger receipts, and various household equipment made by Azerbaijani craftsmen are exhibited in local and foreign museums.		01874	DA0104000054
Iftar/Eftari/Iftar/Iftor and its socio-cultural traditions (2023) + (Note: Shared with Iran, Turkey, and Uzbekistan.)	KP; OT; PA; SR			01984	
Art of illumination: Təzhib/Tazhib/Zarhalkori/Tezhip/Naqqoshlik (2023) + (Note: Shared with Iran, Tajikistan, Turkey, and Uzbekistan.)	KP; TC			01981	
Tandir craftsmanship and bread baking in Azerbaijan (2024)	TC; SR			02120	

=== List of Intangible Cultural Heritage in Need of Urgent Safeguarding ===
Name (date)	D.	Description	Image	Registration	
Name (date)	D.	Description	Image	UNESCO	National
Chovqan, a traditional Karabakh horse-riding game in the Republic of Azerbaijan (2013)	SR	Chowgan (or chovgan) is a national sport in Azerbaijan. Depicting the fragments of the chovgan game on a bowl found in Orangala indicates that this game existed in Beylagan (Beylagan district) in the 11th century. In Nizami Ganjavi's work "Khosrov and Shirin" and in the epic "Kitabi-Dada Gorgud", a blizzard is found. Starting from 1960, blizzard competitions were held in Azerbaijan first as a demonstration, and then officially. Related Topics: horse riding games, nomad etc. Bioms: agroecosystem, mountains Risk Factors: conflicts, declining youth interest, insufficient financial resources, loss of relevance, material shortages, rapid economic changes, repressive policies, rural-urban migration		00905	FO0101000002
Yalli (Kochari, Tenzere), traditional group dances of Nakhchivan (2018)	OT; PA; SR	Yalli is an Azerbaijani dance performed as a group. Azerbaijani researcher M.K.Allahverdiyev divides mane dances into two groups. The first group includes nomadic, "qazı-qazı", "çop-çoğu" and second group include "urfanı", "tənzərə", "dönə" . Nomadic dance reflects elements of pastoral play. In relation to totemism in nomadic choreography, animal movements and habits indicate the archaic nature of the dance. Since the tanzare dance is simpler in terms of choreography than the nosheri, it is played more often during entertainment (weddings, folk ceremonies). Trumpets and drums accompany the dance. Related topics: games, mime artist Bioms: agroecosystem, dry areas, mountains Risk Factors: conflicts, decline of performers, loss of importance, disuse, decline of repertoire, rural-to-urban migration, theatricalization		01190	FM0401000001; FM0401020006; FM0401020002

=== Register of Good Safeguarding Practices ===
No example from Azerbaijan is included in this UNESCO list.

== Nominations ==
=== Reserved Nominations ===
Name (date)	D.	Description	Image	Registration	
Name (date)	D.	Description	Image	UNESCO	National
Cultural Environment of Nij (2012)	SR	Udins, Azerbaijanis and Lezgis live in Nij. There are three churches (Church of Saint Elisæus, St. Mary Mother Church, Tsilin Church) and a mosque. The Nic Udins have a separate dialect and traditionally celebrate Easter and Kala Akhsibay.			
Cultural environment of Gyrmyzy Gasaba (2012)	SR	Gyrmyzy Gasaba is the last remaining shtetl in the world. Juhuri language is spoken here. The mountain Jewish community of the Red Settlement has traditionally been engaged in agriculture, gardening and carpet making for 300 years. The examples of carpet weaving, which is one of the main indicators of the economic activity of the Mountain Jews, are woven on the basis of wool and belong to the Guba school of carpet weaving.			

== Intangible cultural heritage cooperation ==
	Registered intangible cultural heritage												Total
Countries	Novruz	Lavash	Kamancheh	Dede Qorkut	Miniature	Tea Culture	Molla Nasreddin	Silk culture	Balaban	Pearl inlay	Iftar	Təzhib	Total
AFG	✓							✓					2
IND	✓												1
IRN	✓	✓	✓		✓			✓			✓	✓	7
IRQ	✓												1
KAZ	✓	✓		✓			✓						4
KGZ	✓	✓					✓						3
MNG	✓												1
PAK	✓												1
TJK	✓						✓	✓				✓	4
TKM	✓						✓	✓					3
TUR	✓	✓		✓	✓	✓	✓	✓	✓	✓	✓	✓	11
UZB	✓				✓		✓	✓			✓	✓	6

== See also ==
- List of World Heritage Sites in Azerbaijan
