= Khila-Afshan carpets =

Handwoven Persian-style decorative rugs

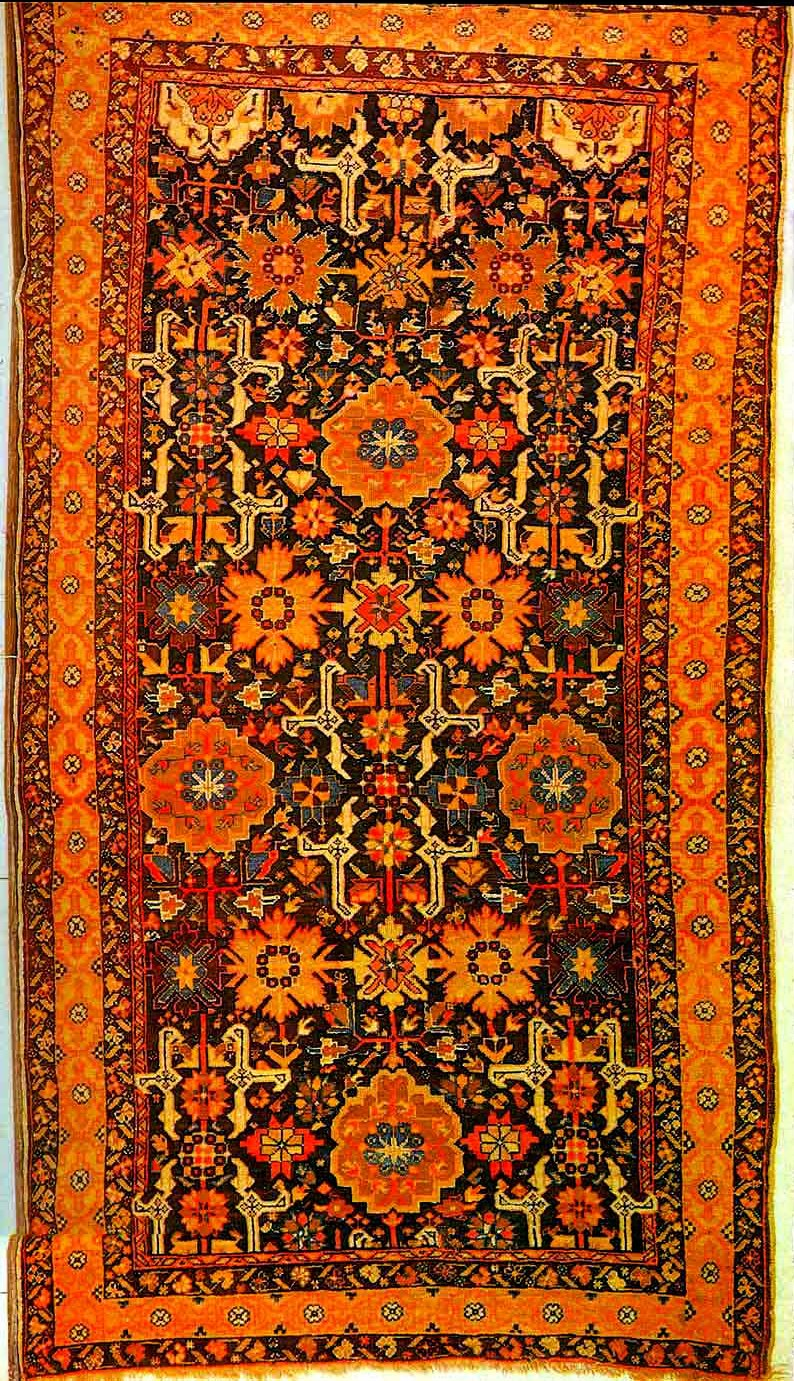
“Khila-Afshan” carpet, Absheron carpet weaving school, Azerbaijan

"Khila-Afshan" (Azerbaijani: Xilə-əfşan) - pile carpets belonging to the Baku group of Absheron carpet weaving school.

== Overview ==
“Khila-Afshan” carpets received their name from the village of Khila (known as Amirjan now) in the administrative-territorial unit of the Absheron Peninsula, located 15 km away from Baku. The meaning of the word "Afshan" in dictionary is to scatter, to grind, colorful. These carpets were later produced in Bulbula and Surakhani carpet weaving factories. These carpets, popularly known as "Sajayagi" (Azerbaijani: Sacayağı), are often called "Shirvan" by some foreign authors in their works, and mistakenly "Derbent" by others.

== Artistic particularities ==
The composition of the middle field of the “Khila-Afshan” carpet is divided into two types called “Gadim Afshan” (English: Ancient Afshan) and “Gullu Afshan” (English: Afshan with flowers) carpets.

"Gadim Afshan" carpets - the composition of the middle field is based on the principle of a wide network. In this network, khonchas which have lighter tones perform a schematic function. Khonchas are of “nabati” origin in terms of contours and interior design. The spaces in the center are also filled with khonchas of other shapes and sizes. All elements are connected by thin lines one another. These lines are also of plant origin. The resulting pattern can be read both vertically and horizontally.

"Afshan" composition is also used in carpets of Tabriz group. This complex composition, which is spread in such cities as Ardabil, Sarab, Arasbaran, where carpet weaving is developed, is especially characteristic for the city of Tabriz. For this reason, it is known as "Afshan - Tabriz".

Although "Afshan" carpets is produced in the north-east of historical Azerbaijan (Maraza, Bico), their complex composition is typical of the "Baku-Khila" carpet group and is known as "Khila-Afshan".

"Gullu Afshan" carpets - the main difference of the composition is that each of its long-distance rapports is independent and makes up a quarter of the middle area of the carpet. In addition, the composition "Afshan" is completed with a lake in the middle, which is characteristic of "Khila".

The edge strip consists of a middle border and two small borders on either side of it. The edge that surrounds the composition "Gollu Afshan" (English: Afshan with a lake) is more complicated: four or two strips are added to the edge strips. The middle border is called the "Gadim heykal" (English: Ancient statue). The background of the middle field of "Khila-Afshan" carpets is usually navy blue, sometimes turquoise, blue, red or white. The color of the corners, lakes and stripes matches the background of the middle area.

== Technical particularities ==
The size of "Khile-afshan carpets" can vary from 130x200 cm to 150x250 cm. Elongated carpets were mostly produced in these carpet weaving centers.

The density of loops per square decimeter in "Khila-Afshan carpets" ranges from 40x40 loops to 45x45 loops. The number of loops per square meter varies from 160000 to 200000 loops.

The height of the pile of “Khila-Afshan carpets” is 5-7 mm.

== See also ==
- Azerbaijani rug
- Absheron carpet weaving school
- Shabalyt buta carpet
