= Absheron carpet weaving school =

Azerbaijani carpet weaving school

The Absheron Carpet Weaving School is one of the Azerbaijani carpet weaving schools. The school covers the Absheron villages: Goradil, Novkhani, Surakhani, Nardaran, Bulbul, Fatmai, Mardakan, Qala, Khila, as well as the Khyzy region. Such centers of carpet weaving as Gadi, Khil, Kesh, Fyndygan and others are also known.

== Carpets of the Absheron school ==
=== Characteristic ===
The carpets are characterized by softness and intensity of colors, original geometric patterns. The geometric patterns and images of plants are often associated with the decorations of these carpets.

Most of the carpets bear the names of the places and villages where they were woven. Examples of such carpets are such famous compositions as Khilabuta, Hila-Afshan, Novkhani, Surakhani, Kala, Baky, Goradil, Fatmai, Fyndygan, Gadi, etc. One of the best products of the Baku carpet weaving school is the "Zili" carpet, woven in a manner similar to the "Shadda" carpet.

== Gallery ==
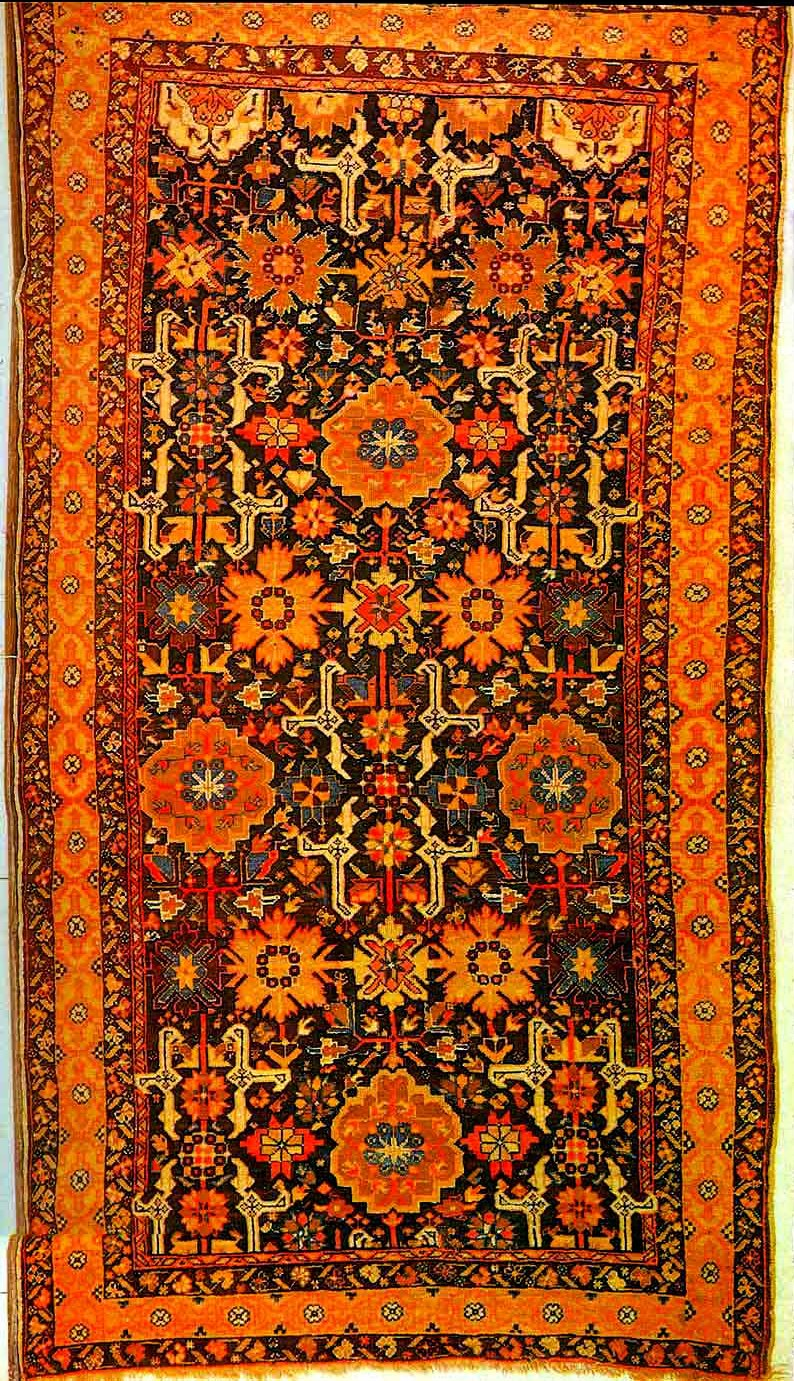

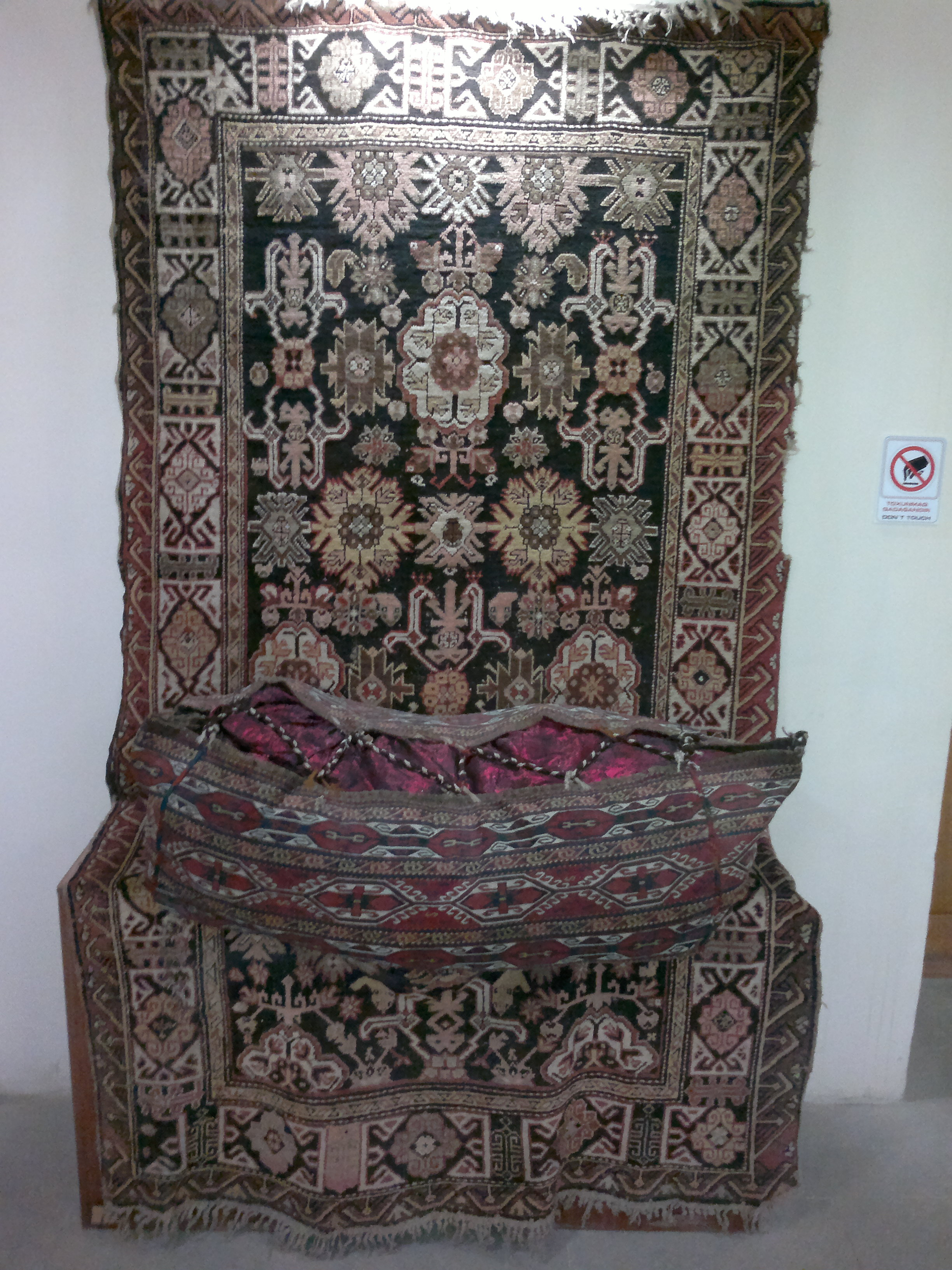

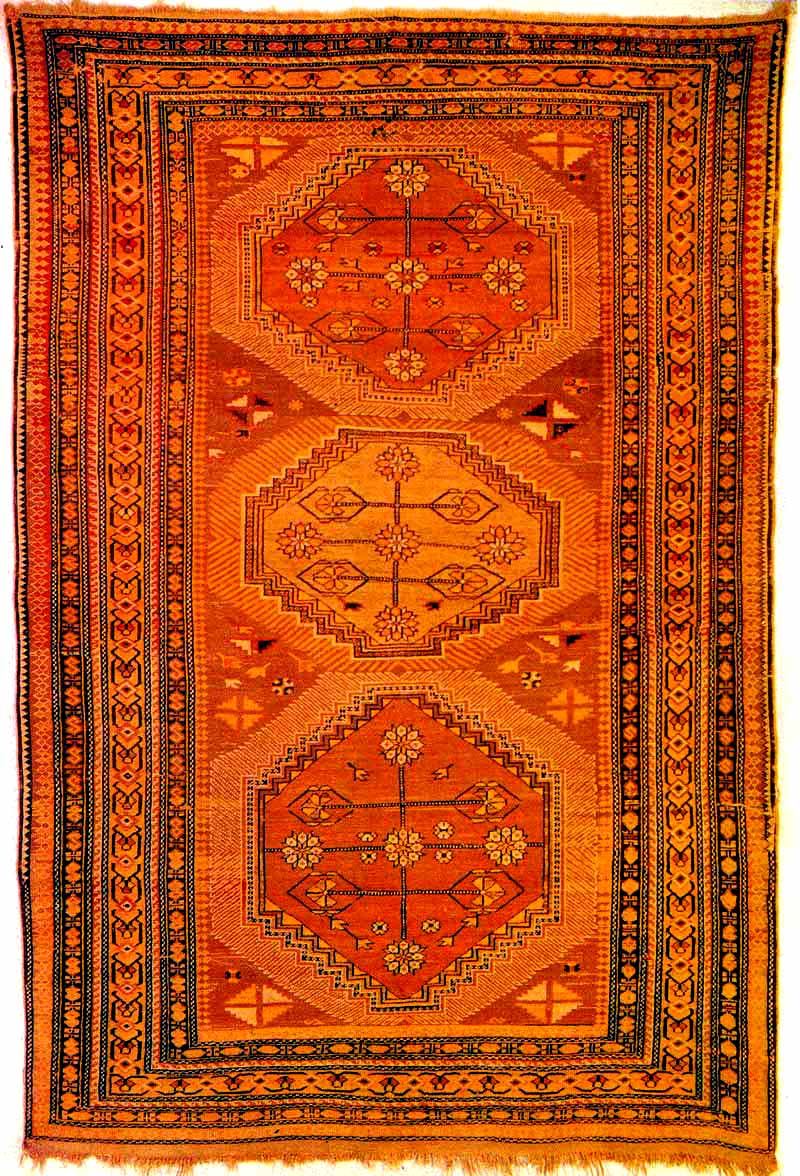

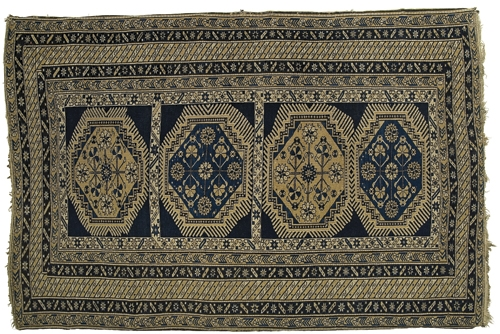

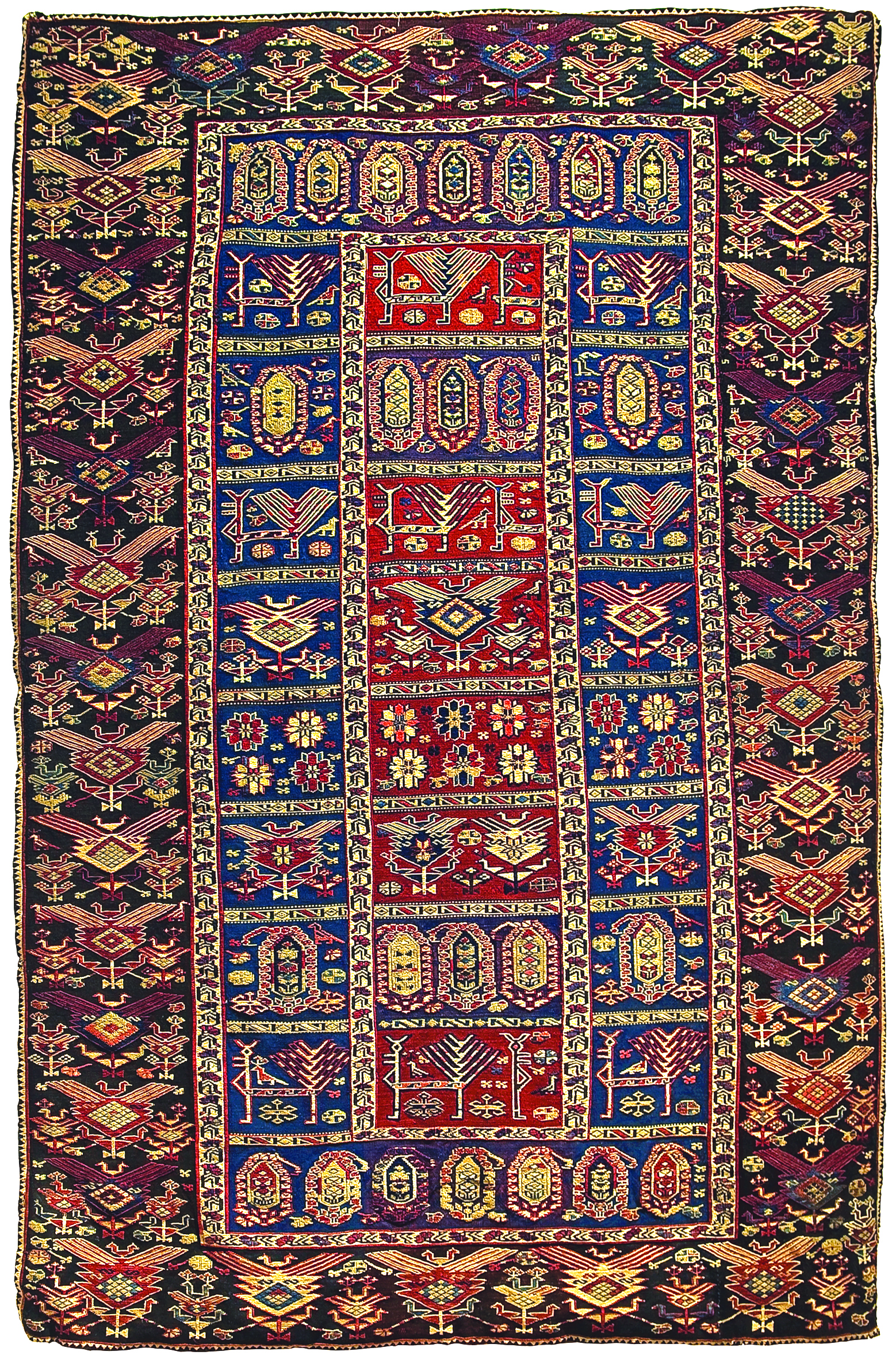

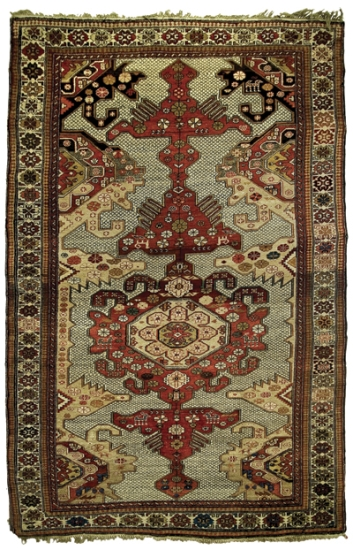

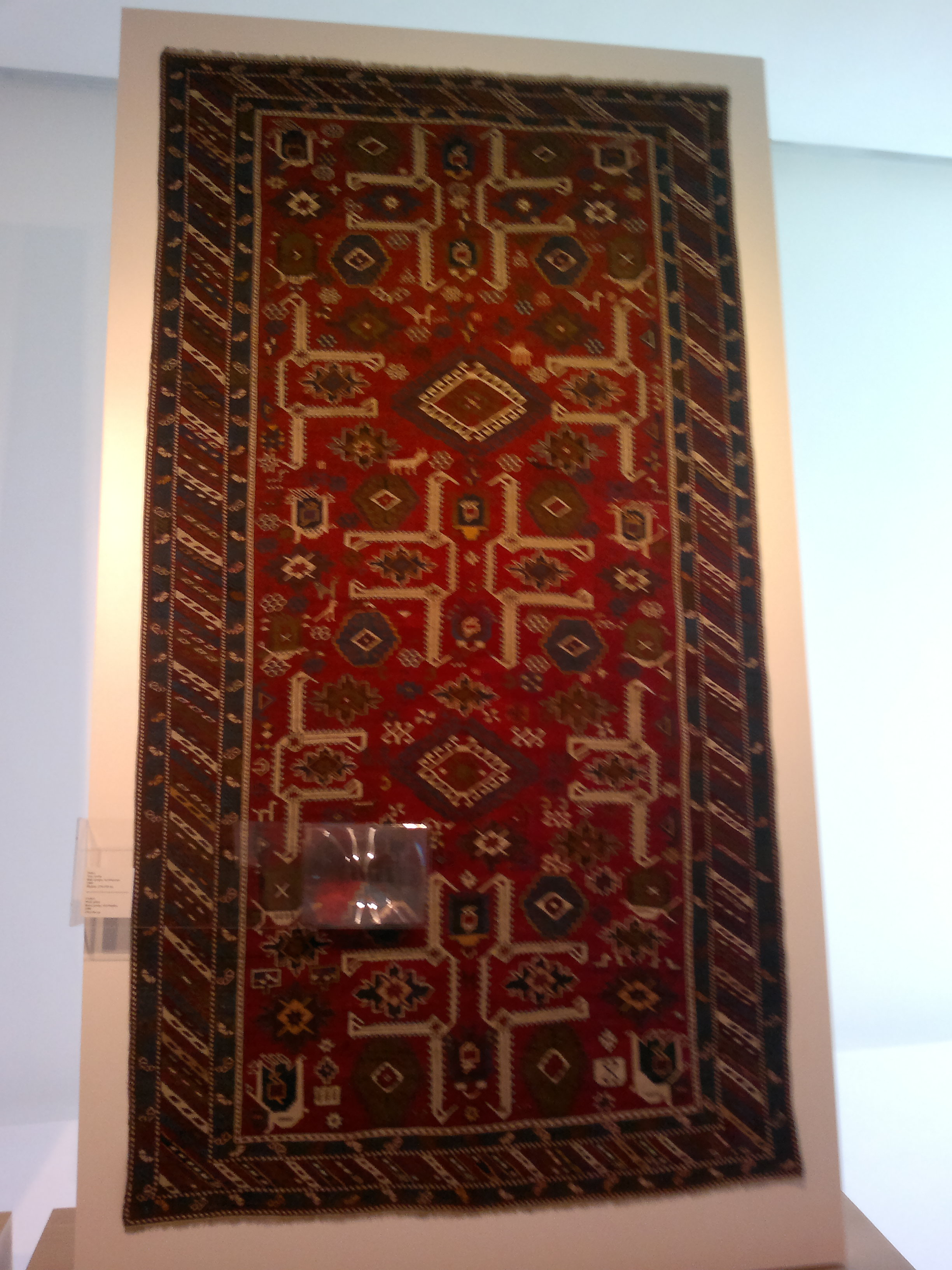

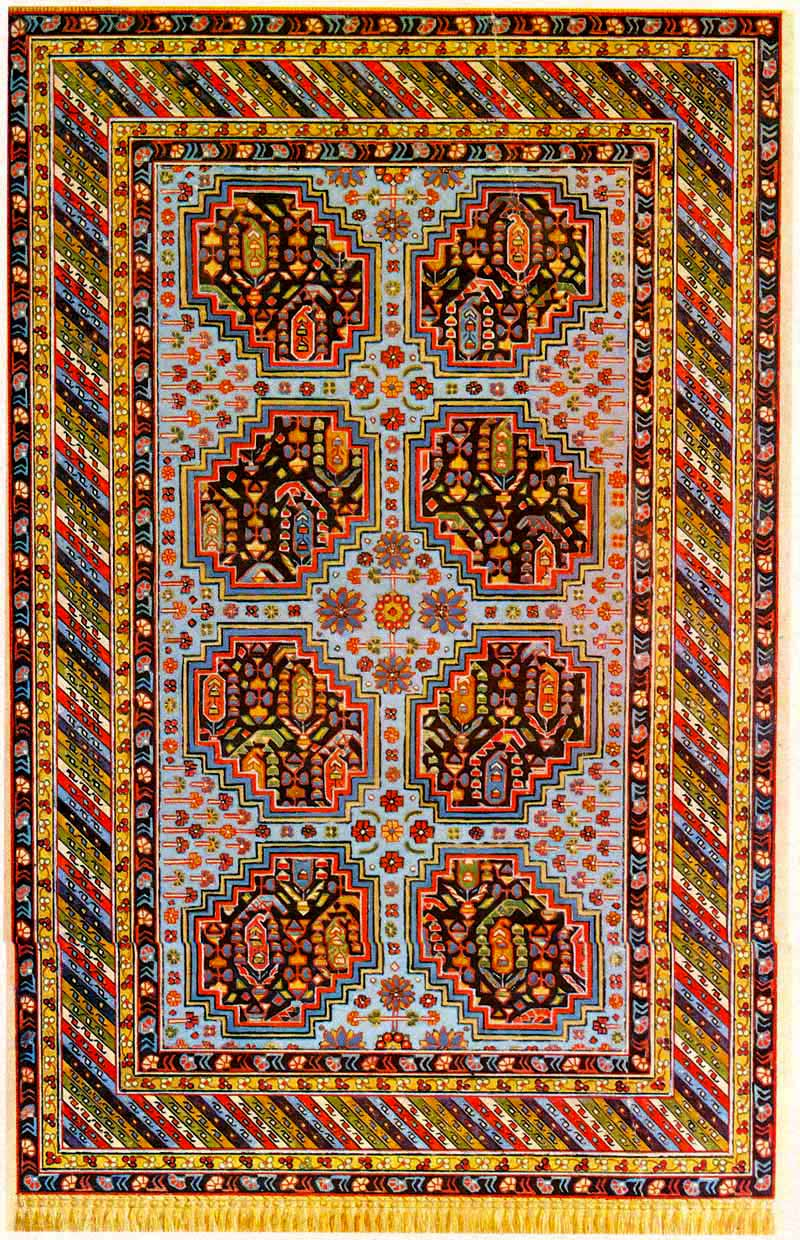

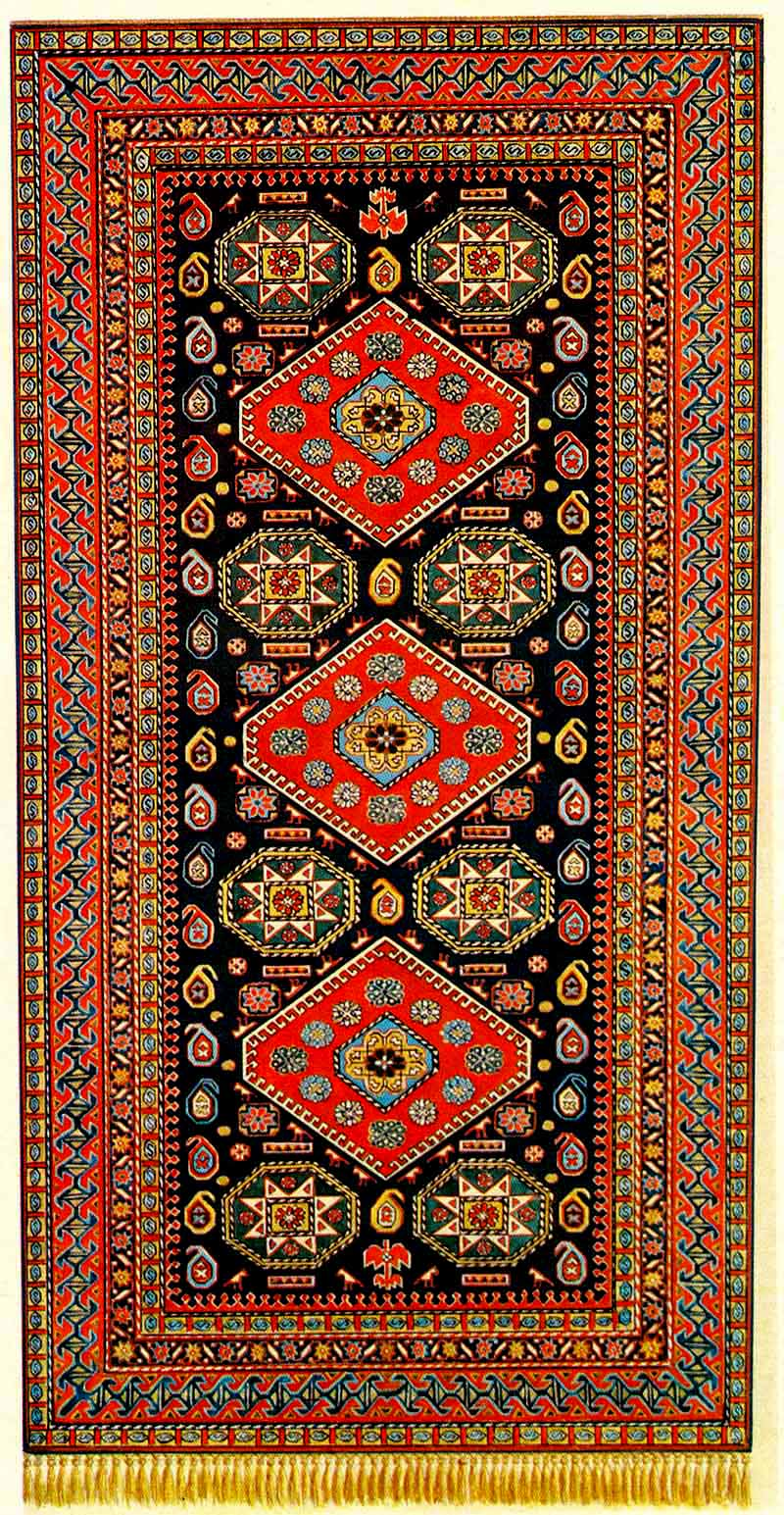

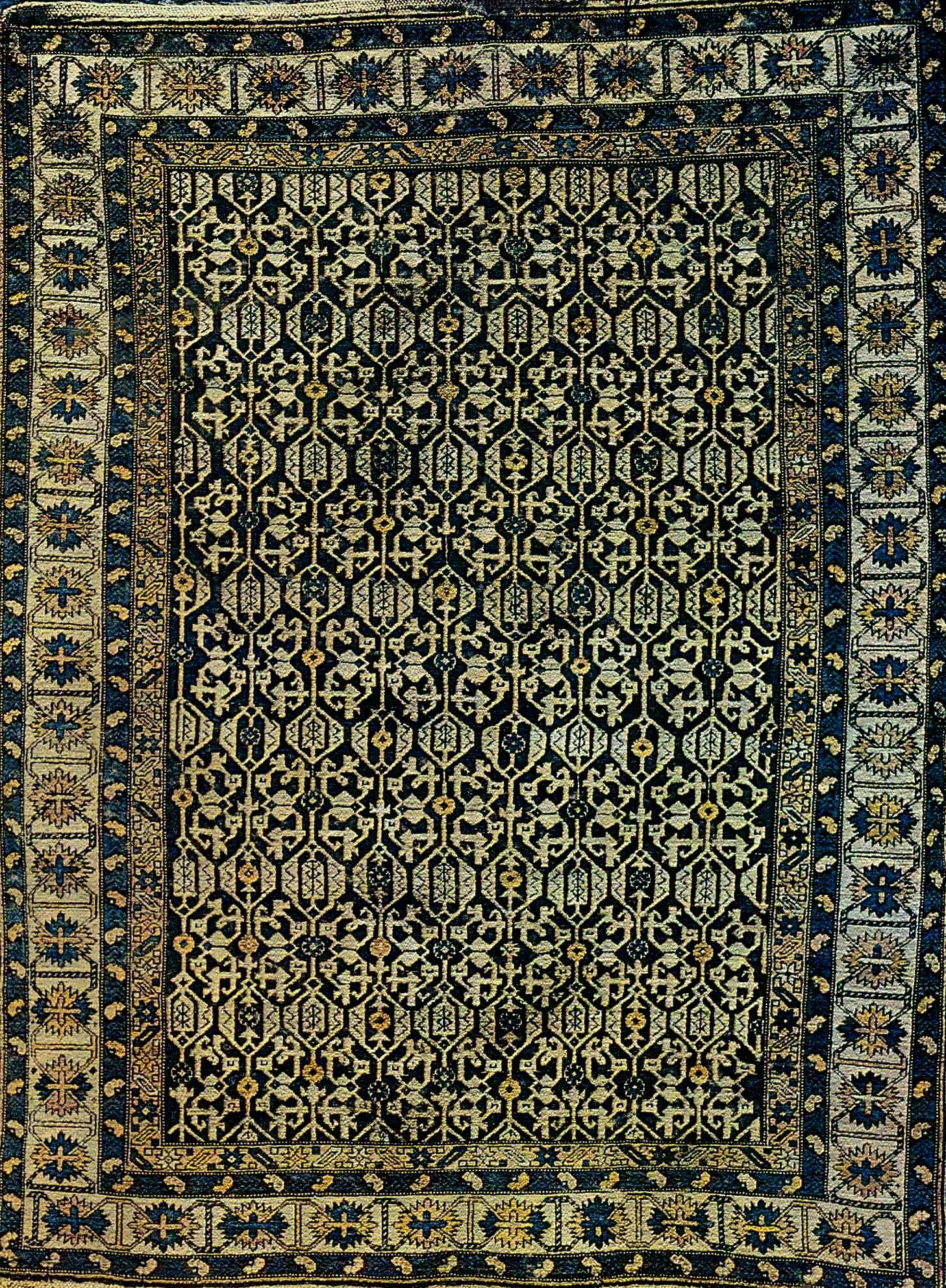

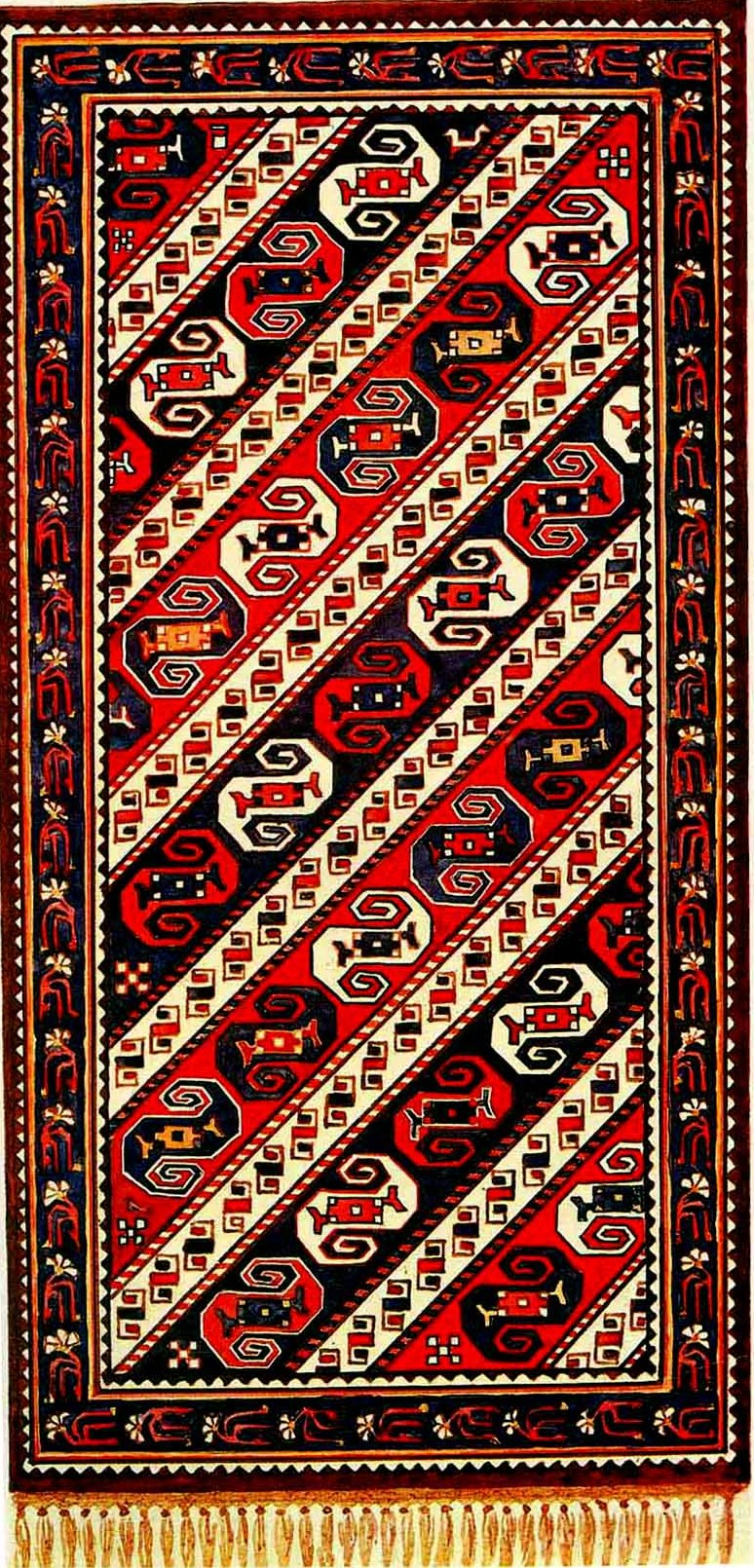

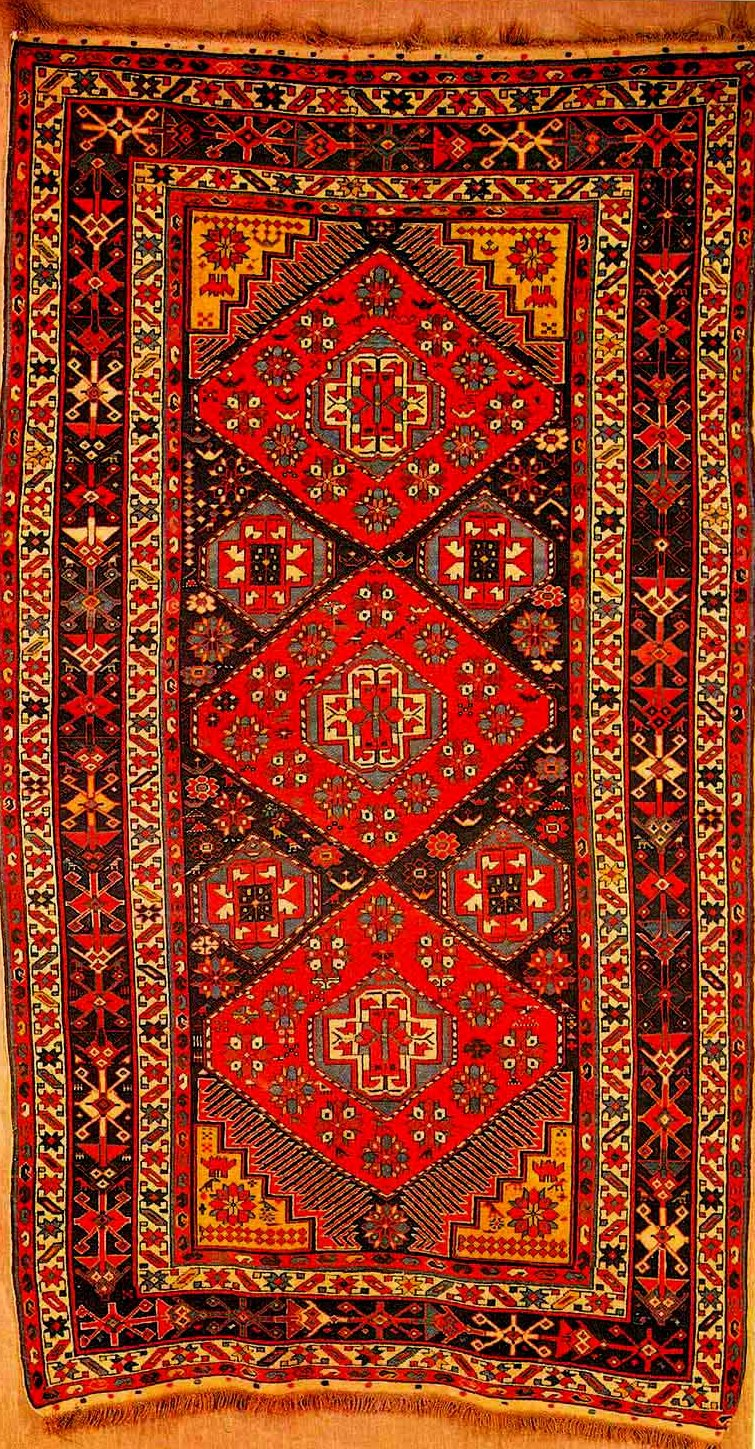

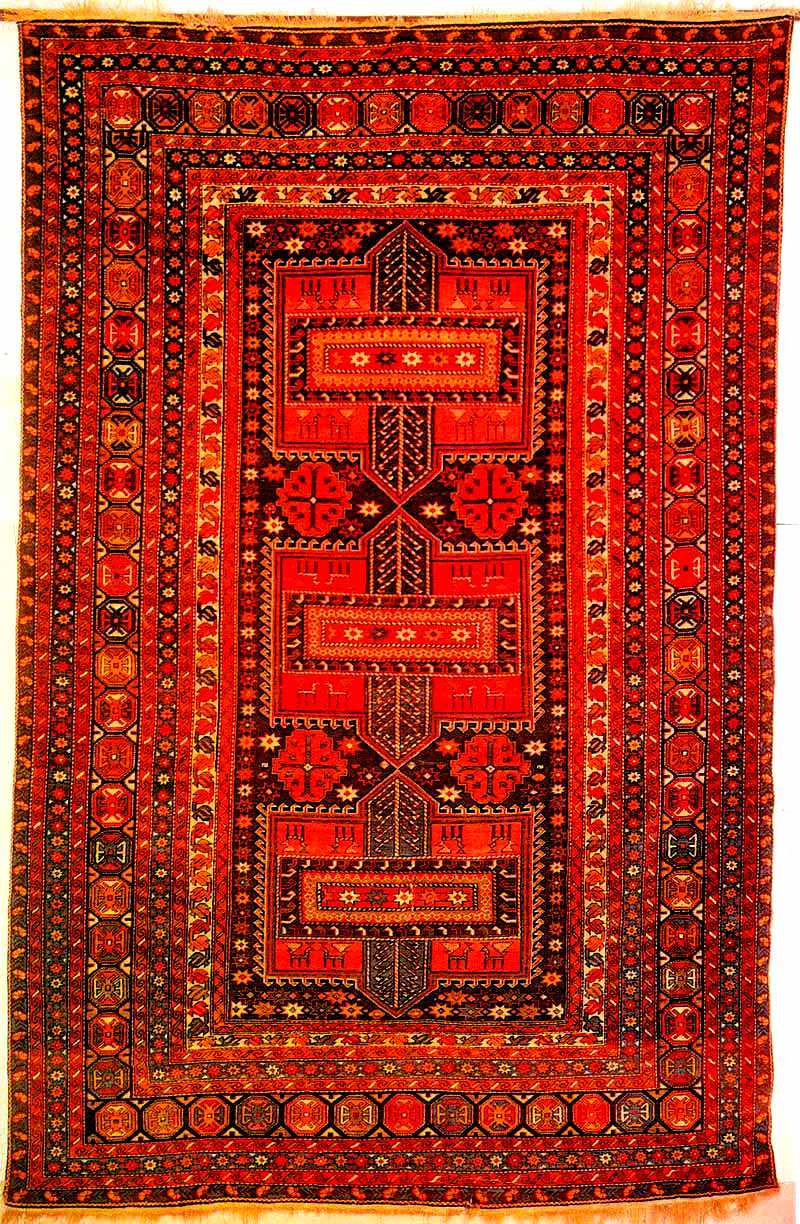

== See also ==
- Quba rugs and carpets
- Ganja rugs
