= List of World Heritage Sites in Azerbaijan =

World Heritage Sites in Azerbaijan

The United Nations Educational, Scientific and Cultural Organization (UNESCO) designates World Heritage Sites of outstanding universal value to cultural or natural heritage which have been nominated by countries which are signatories to the UNESCO World Heritage Convention, established in 1972. Cultural heritage consists of monuments (such as architectural works, monumental sculptures, or inscriptions), groups of buildings, and sites (including archaeological sites). Natural heritage consists of natural features (physical and biological formations), geological and physiographical formations (including habitats of threatened species of animals and plants), and natural sites which are important from the point of view of science, conservation, or natural beauty. Azerbaijan ratified the convention on 16 December 1993.

Azerbaijan has five sites on the list. The first site added to the list was the Walled City of Baku with the Shirvanshah's Palace and Maiden Tower, in 2000. Due to the damage sustained in the 2000 Baku earthquake, the site was listed as endangered from 2003 to 2009. The Gobustan Rock Art Cultural Landscape was listed in 2007. In 2013, these two sites were given enhanced protection status by the Committee for the Protection of Cultural Property in the Event of Armed Conflict. The most recent addition were the Hyrcanian forests and the cultural landscape of Khinalig, in 2023. This is the country's only natural site and is shared with Iran. In addition, Azerbaijan has ten sites on the tentative list.

== World Heritage Sites ==
UNESCO lists sites under ten criteria; each entry must meet at least one of the criteria. Criteria i through vi are cultural, and vii through x are natural.

* Transnational site

World Heritage Sites
Site	Image	Location	Year listed	UNESCO data	Description
Walled City of Baku with Shirvanshah's Palace and Maiden Tower	Stone tower with some surrounding walls	Baku	2000	958; iv (cultural)	The urban ensemble of the Walled City of Baku demonstrates the influences of several cultures that were present in the area through history: Zoroastrian, Sassanian, Arabic, Persian, Shirvani, Ottoman, and Russian. The defensive walls date to the 12th century, as does the Maiden Tower (pictured), which was built upon earlier structures dating from the 7th to 6th centuries BCE. The Shirvanshah's Palace was built in the 15th century. In 2003, the site was listed as endangered due to the damage sustained in the 2000 Baku earthquake, as well as by the absence of conservation policies, dubious restoration efforts, and pressures of urban development. After improvements in management and preservation, the site was removed from the endangered list in 2009.
Gobustan Rock Art Cultural Landscape	Rocks at the entrance to the park	Garadagh District and Absheron District	2007	1076rev; iii (cultural)	The petroglyphs on rocky boulders at Gobustan document the human presence in the area spanning 40,000 years. There are over 6,000 rock carvings that depict human figures, plants, animals, as well as hunting and fishing scenes. In the period following the Last Glacial Maximum, the climate and vegetation of the area were warmer and wetter than today. In addition to rock art, the remains of settlements and burials have been found on the site as well.
Historic Centre of Sheki with the Khan's Palace	Stained glass windows in the palace	Sheki	2019	1549rev; ii, v (cultural)	The city of Sheki (or Shaki) lies below the Greater Caucasus mountains and was an important city on the trade routes crossing the Caucasus. The historic centre dates to the 18th century, built after the previous town was destroyed by mudflows. Traditional houses feature high gable roofs. The city became rich due to the breeding of silkworms and trade in their cocoons in the late 18th and 19th centuries. The wealth is reflected in the Khan's Palace and merchant houses.
Hyrcanian Forests*	A stream in a lush green forest	Lankaran District and Astara District	2023	1584bis; ix, x (natural)	These broadleaf deciduous forests grow between the shores of the Caspian Sea and the arid interior. The evolution of the forests was never interrupted by the Quaternary glaciations, allowing evolution and speciation of animal and plant species. The forests are home to the endangered Persian leopard and to endemic tree species Parrotia persica, Pterocarya fraxinifolia, and Zelkova carpinifolia. The forests in Iran were independently inscribed in 2019, the two forest areas of Hirkan National Park in Azerbaijan were added in 2023.
Cultural Landscape of Khinalig People and “Köç Yolu” Transhumance Route	Look at the village on a hill	Quba District	2023	1696; iii, v (cultural)	Khinalig is a village located in the Greater Caucasus mountains, at an elevation of 2,300 metres (7,500 ft). It has been inhabited since the Bronze Age. People in the area speak their own language and have unique cultural traditions. Annually, they are using the Köç Yolu transhumance route to bring the livestock between winter and summer pastures. This route, which is 200 km (120 mi) long, has numerous camping sites, mosques, and mausoleums.

== Tentative list ==
In addition to the sites on the World Heritage list, member states can maintain a list of tentative sites that they may consider for nomination. Nominations for the World Heritage list are only accepted if the site has previously been listed on the tentative list. Azerbaijan has twelve sites on its tentative list.

Tentative World Heritage SitesTentative sites
Site	Image	Location	Year listed	UNESCO criteria	Description
Surakhany, Atashgyakh (Fire – worshippers, temple – museum at Surakhany)	Fire temple in stone, surrounded by walls	Baku	1998	i, iii (cultural)	The fire temple at Surakhany was one of the main centres of the Zoroastrian religion in history. The present buildings were constructed in the 17th century and were an active place of worship until 1883. The complex has a pentagonal plan with an open courtyard and a tetragonal altar in the middle.
The mausoleum of Nakhichevan	Garabaghlar Mausoleum with intricate decoration and two minarets in the background	Nakhchivan	1998	i, iv (cultural)	This nomination includes several mausoleums in Nakhichevan, including the Garabaghlar Mausoleum (pictured), Momine Khatun Mausoleum, Yusif ibn Kuseyir Mausoleum, and Gulustan Mausoleum. They were constructed in the 12th century for the local nobles. Some mausoleums were designed by the architect Ajami Nakhchivani. Mausoleums typically feature an octagonal plan and are decorated with glazed bricks with elaborate patterns.
"Binegadi" 4th Period Fauna and Flora Deposit	Skeleton of Rhinoceros binagadensis in a museum	Baku	1998	viii, ix (natural)	This nomination covers the tar pits in the Baku area. They are rich in fossils from the Pliocene period. About 50,000 bones have been uncovered at the site, including 40 species of mammals and 120 species of birds, as well as over 100 species of insects and several plant remains. A rhinoceros skeleton uncovered at the site is pictured.
"Lok-Batan" Mud Cone	–	Baku	1998	vii, viii, ix (natural)	The "Lok-Batan" Mud Cone is a mud volcano located in the Baku area. The first documented eruption took place in 1864, followed by around 20 since. The deposits around the cone date to the Pliocene period.
"Baku Stage" Mountain	–	Baku	1998	viii, ix (natural)	The "Baku Stage" Mountain is a stratigraphic column with a height of 70 metres (230 ft) in the Baku area. It is interesting in view of geological deposits and palaeontological remains.
The Caspian Shore Defensive Constructions	Stone castle with walls and a tower	several sites	2001	(cultural)	While the northern border of Azerbaijan is protected by the Caucasus Mountains, the Caspian Shore presented a possible way for an invasion. The defensive line stretched from Derbent (now in Russia) to the Absheron Peninsula. The narrowest passage between the Besh Barmag Mountain, the end of the Caucasus range, and the shore is 11.75 kilometres (7.30 mi). Some of the defensive structures from the 12th and 13th centuries include the Maiden Tower, the now submerged Sabayil Castle, and the Mardakan Castle (pictured).
Susha historical and architectural reserve	Susha, view from above	Shusha District	2001	i, iv, v, vi (cultural)	Susha was the capital of the Karabakh Khanate, one of several independent khanates that appeared in the South Caucasus in the 18th century. In addition to its defensive location on the top of a mountain (the highest point is at an elevation of 1,600 metres (5,200 ft)), it was fortified with walls and towers. It was an important stop on the Silk Road.
Ordubad historical and architectural reserve	Geysarriya monument, a building in light-coloured stone and brick	Nakhchivan	2001	i, iv, v (cultural)	Ordubad is located under the Zangezur Mountains. It was an important stop on the Silk Road. The first city, Gala, was founded in the 15th century on the bank of the Ordubadchay river. In the 17th and 18th centuries, trade activities moved to the other side of the river. The period architecture includes mosques, market squares, bathhouses, and caravan sheds.
Prehistoric sites of the Azykh and Taghlar caves	Stone tools on display	Khojavend District	2021	i, iii (cultural)	The two caves are nominated because of their archaeological importance. Primitive stone tools and fireplaces, created by Homo erectus who settled there over a million years ago, were found in Azykh Cave. Later layers unveiled remains related to Homo heidelbergensis and Neanderthals, as well as animal remains. Taghlar cave was occupied by the people of the Mousterian culture (flint tools pictured).
Khudafarin Bridges and related sites	An old stone bridge over a river	Jabrayil District	2021	ii, iv (cultural)	These two bridges cross the Aras river. The fifteen-span bridge (pictured) dates to 11-12th centuries and was likely constructed on earlier foundations. It was destroyed and rebuilt several times. It can still be used today. The eleven-span bridge was built in the 13th century. It was largely destroyed in the 1930s so only three arches remain. Historically, the two bridges were used by the caravans of the Silk Road and were connecting empires during different periods.
Ancient Gabala City	Ruins of ancient city walls	Qabala District	2024	ii, iii, iv (cultural)	In the classical era, Gabala was the capital of the Caucasian Albania region and the largest city in the Caucasus. It was influenced by the Roman and Parthian Empires and it was a cosmopolitan city with numerous communities and religions. Later, it was part of several different empires. Important archaeological remains include oval buildings that were likely used for sport events, and remains of a castle and city walls.
Gamigaya and Goy-gol Historical-Cultural and Natural Complex		Ordubad District	2024	ii, iii, vi, vii (mixed)	The petroglyphs at Gamigaya date to the Chalcolithic and Bronze Age periods. The main petroglyph area is located high in the mountains, at an elevation around 3,700 m (12,100 ft). There are over 7000 rock carvings, depicting motifs from a semi-nomadic society, such as human figures and animals, including goats, deer, and aurochs. From the natural perspective, the area is rich in biodiversity, with vegetation zones spanning from semi-desert climate at the foot of the mountains to Alpine tundra at the highest elevations.

== See also ==
- List of Intangible Cultural Heritage elements in Azerbaijan
