= Lahıc copper craft =

Traditional folk art of Lahıc, Azerbaijan

Copper craftsmanship of Lahij
- UNESCO Intangible Cultural Heritage
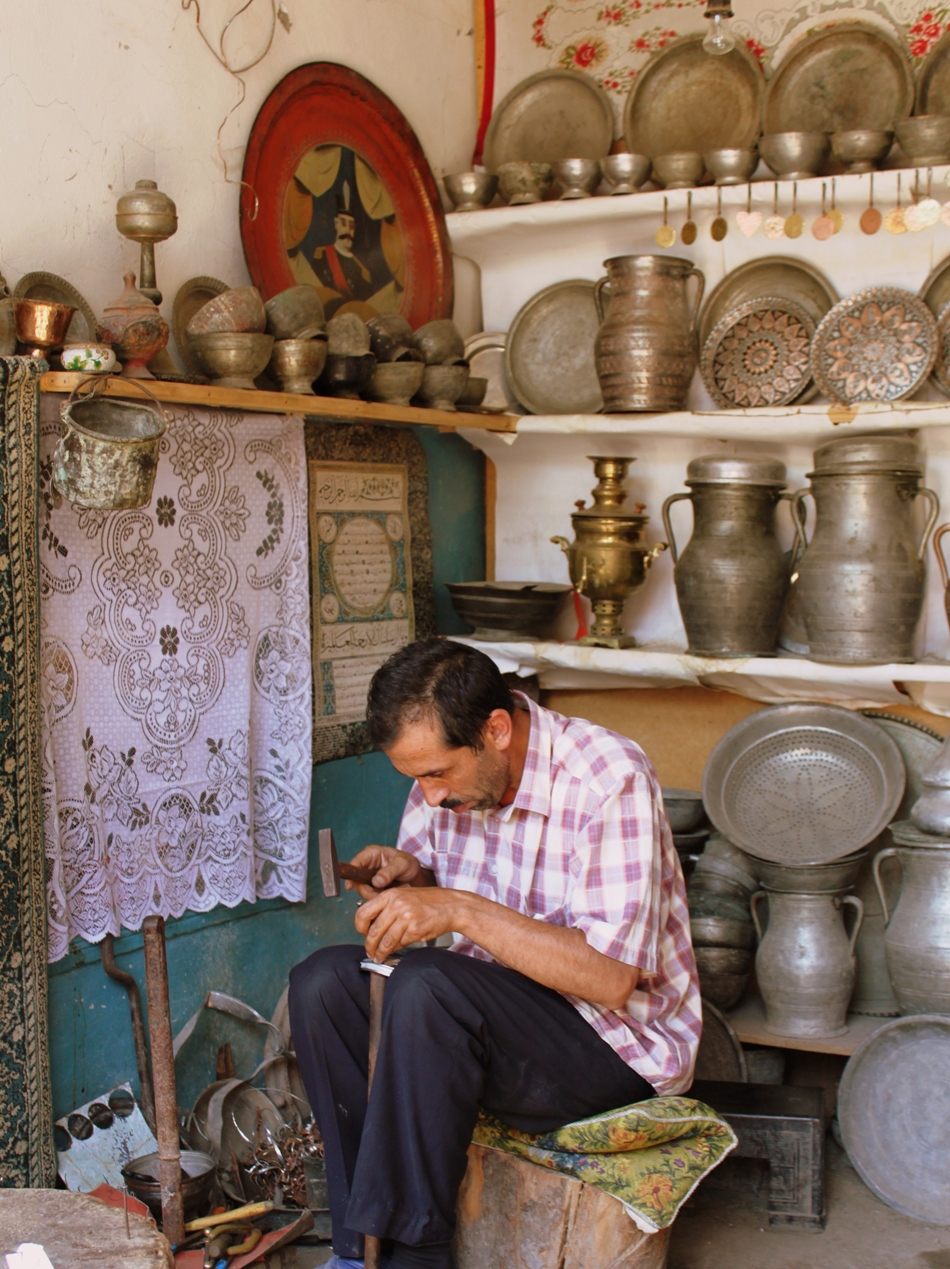
- Country: Azerbaijan
- Reference: 675
- Region: Europe and North America

Inscription history
- Inscription: 2015 (10th session)

Lahıc copper craft is a traditional folk art of Lahıc, Ismailli in Azerbaijan. It includes the production of copper crockery and other products. It was added to UNESCO's Representative List of the Intangible Cultural Heritage of Humanity in 2015.

== History ==
The Aliyev family, one of the copper-smith families of Lahıc, Ismailli, started this craft for the first time in 1725.

Since the 19th century Lahıc, Ismailli has become the main center of copper in Azerbaijan. Large quantities of household goods and home appliances were made in Lahıc. In the middle of the nineteenth century, there were about 200 workshops in Lahıc, Ismailli.

In 1878, a copperware that prepared in Lahic village awarded with a gold medal at the Paris World Exposition. Currently, many handmade Lahic crafts are displayed in museums from London and Paris to Moscow and Istanbul.

On April 19, 2010 in Lahıc, Ismailli a course was opened regarding copper craft. Twelve young men graduated from the first course. The director of the course was the teacher – Nazar Aliyev. Many of the young people who have completed the first year have been employed at the Lahıc Historical and Cultural Reserve. The rest were engaged in copper craft in shops.

In November 2015, the Lahıc copper craft was nominated to the UNESCO Intangible Cultural Heritage Lists. On December 3 of that year, this craft was included in the UNESCO Representative List of Intangible Cultural Heritage.

== Process ==
The whole process is realized under the coordination of the copper-smelting master and usually there are apprentices help the master in order to get essential knowledge and techniques. The coppersmith-hammerer is responsible for pumping the air into the smelting furnace and then the copper hammered into thin plates. These plates are shaped and then polished and decorated with engravings by the craftsperson in the final stage of the process. The decorations on the copperware reflects the traditional and cultural values of the local population. The final products are sold by the masters in the local workshops.

== Products ==
The ready copperwares include household goods and home appliance such as churns, trays, carafes, colander, bowls, and boilers. It is estimated that there are over 40 types of copper handmade items, and categorized in five groups: the copperwares for dishes, tableware, dairy products, carrying water, and other household items for daily requirements.

== On postage stamp ==
Lahıc copper craft was depicted in postage stamps belonging to the "Azerbaijan-Romania Joint Issue" in December 2014.

Joint Issue Azerbaijan - Romania

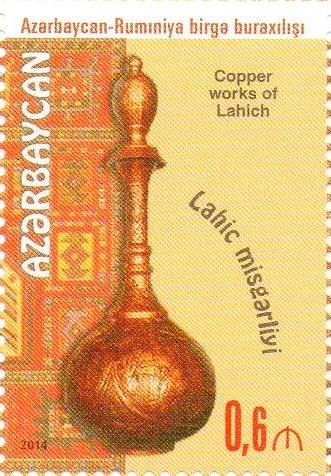
Azerbaijan postage stamp issued in 2014

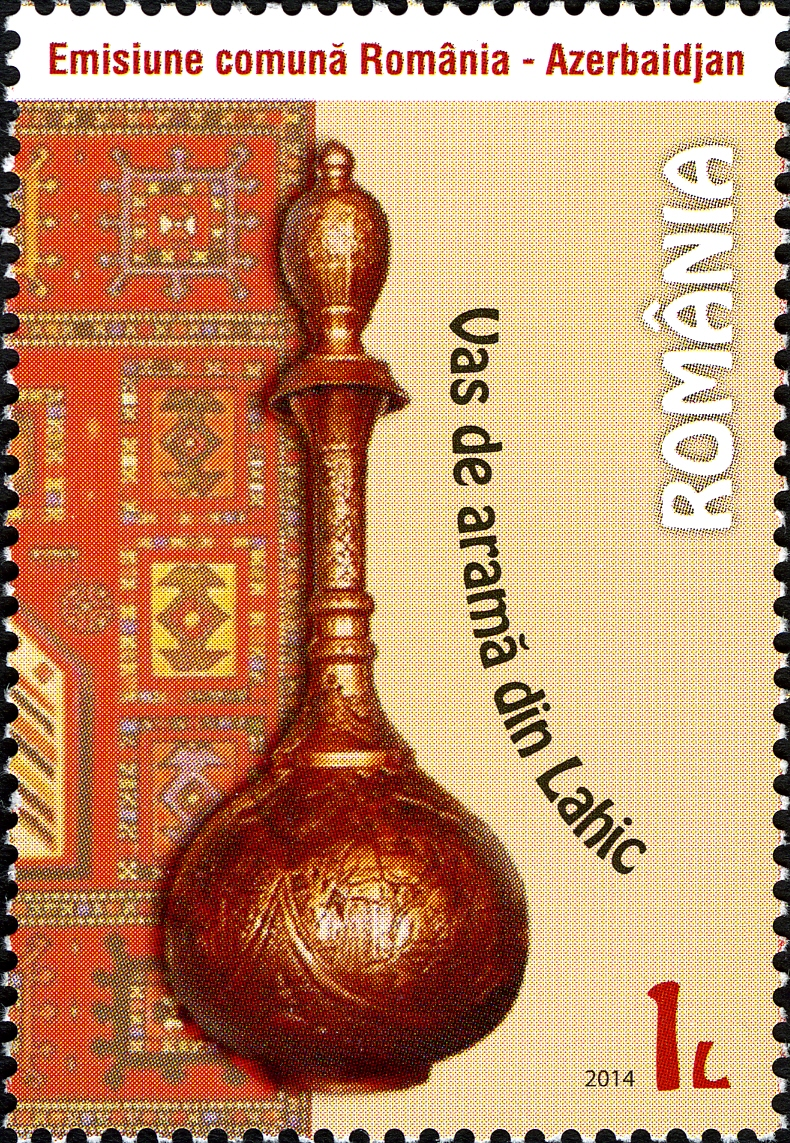
Romania postage stamp issued in 2014

== Gallery ==
Copper Craftsmanship of Lahıc, Ismailli

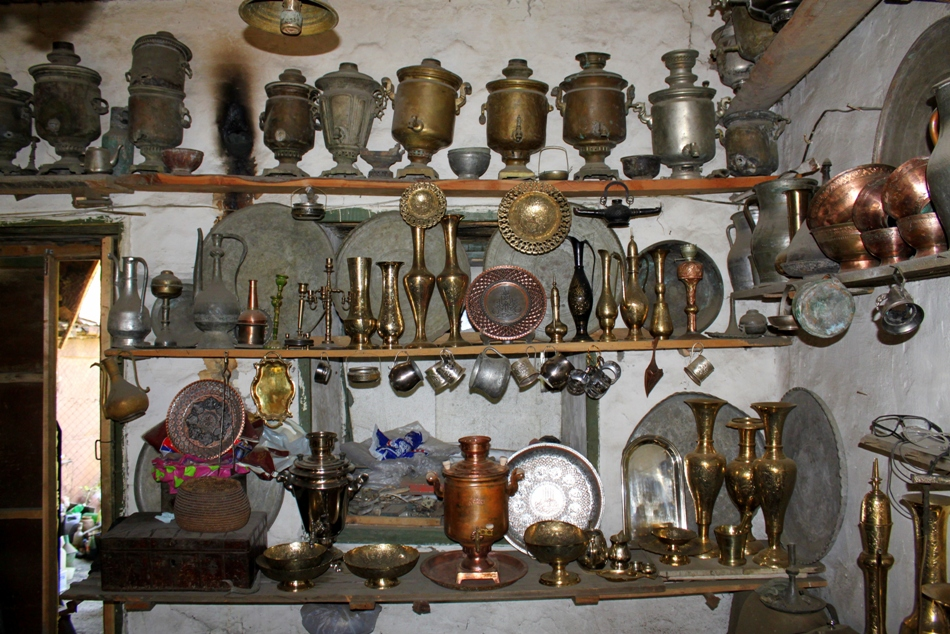

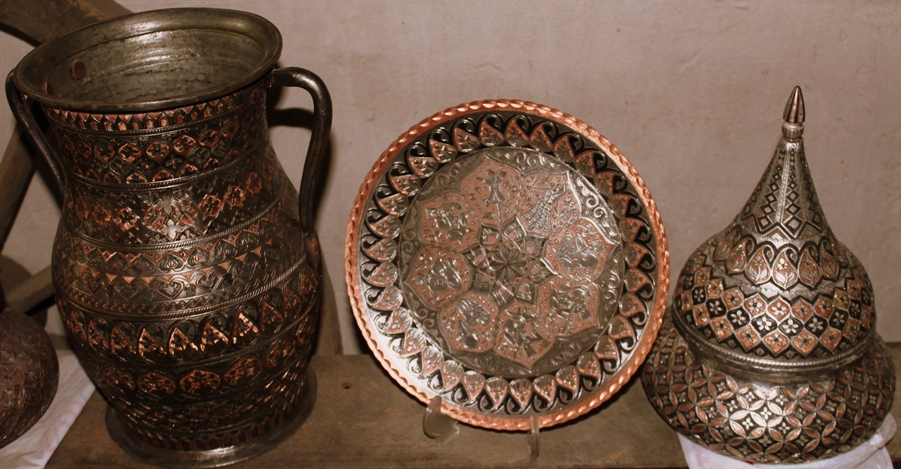

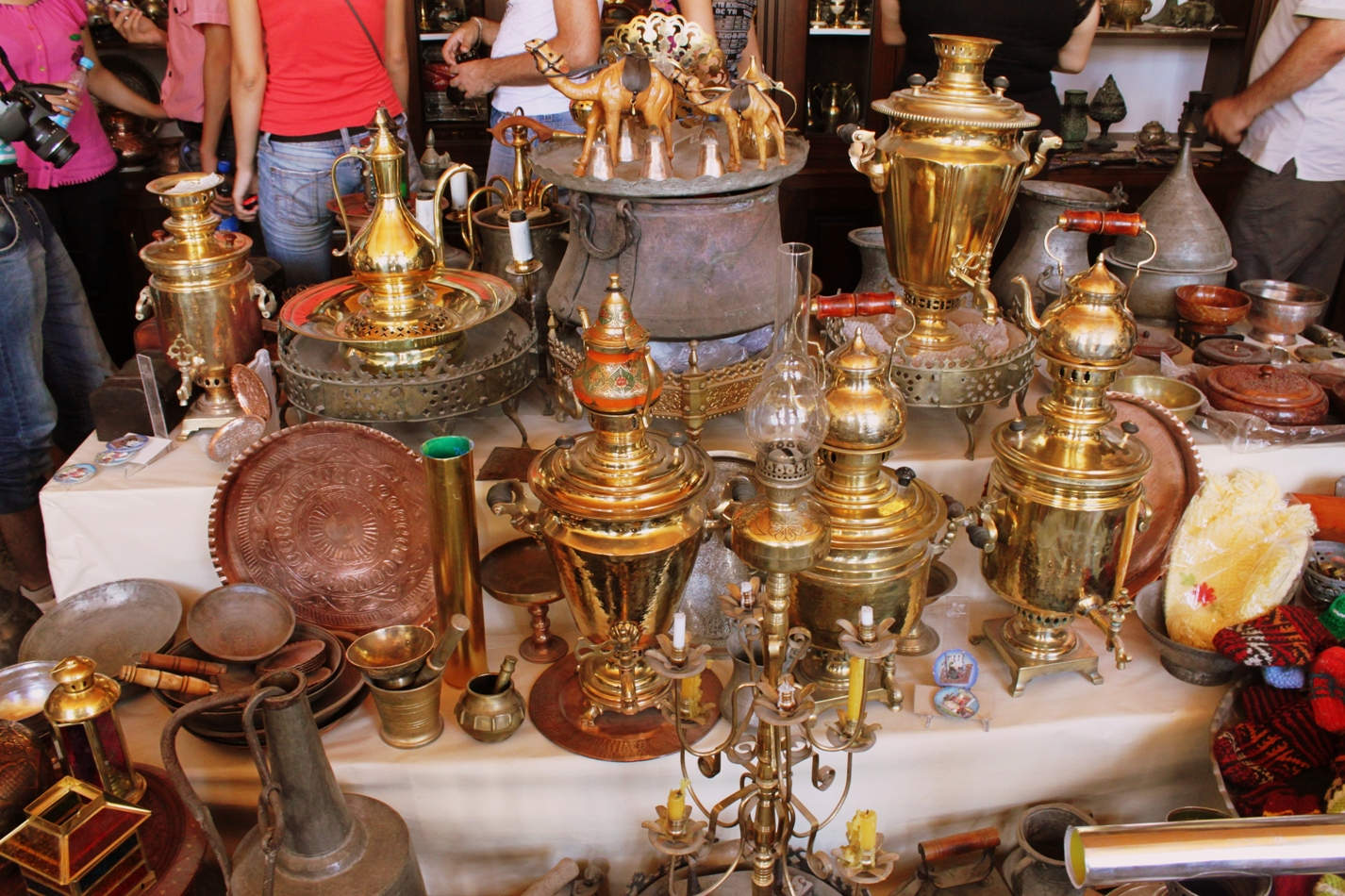

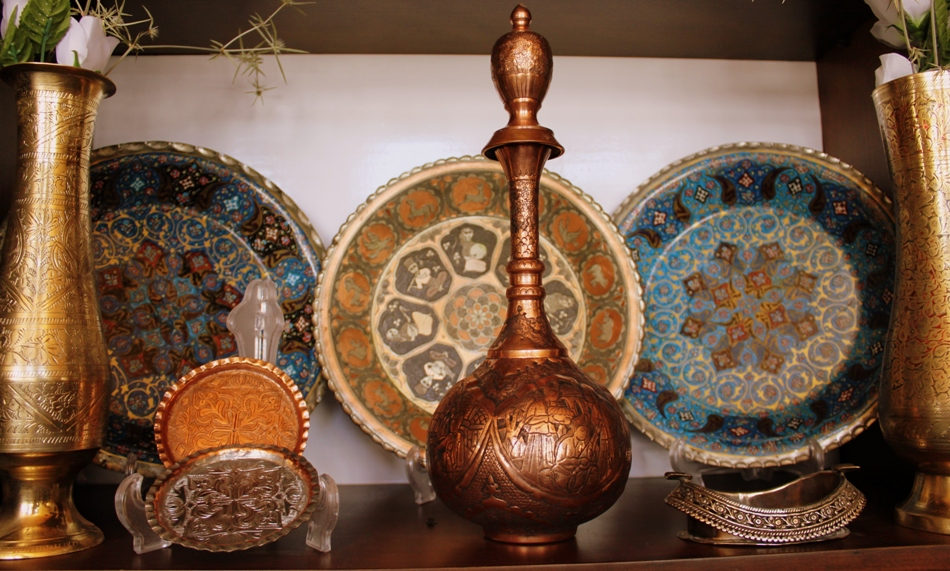

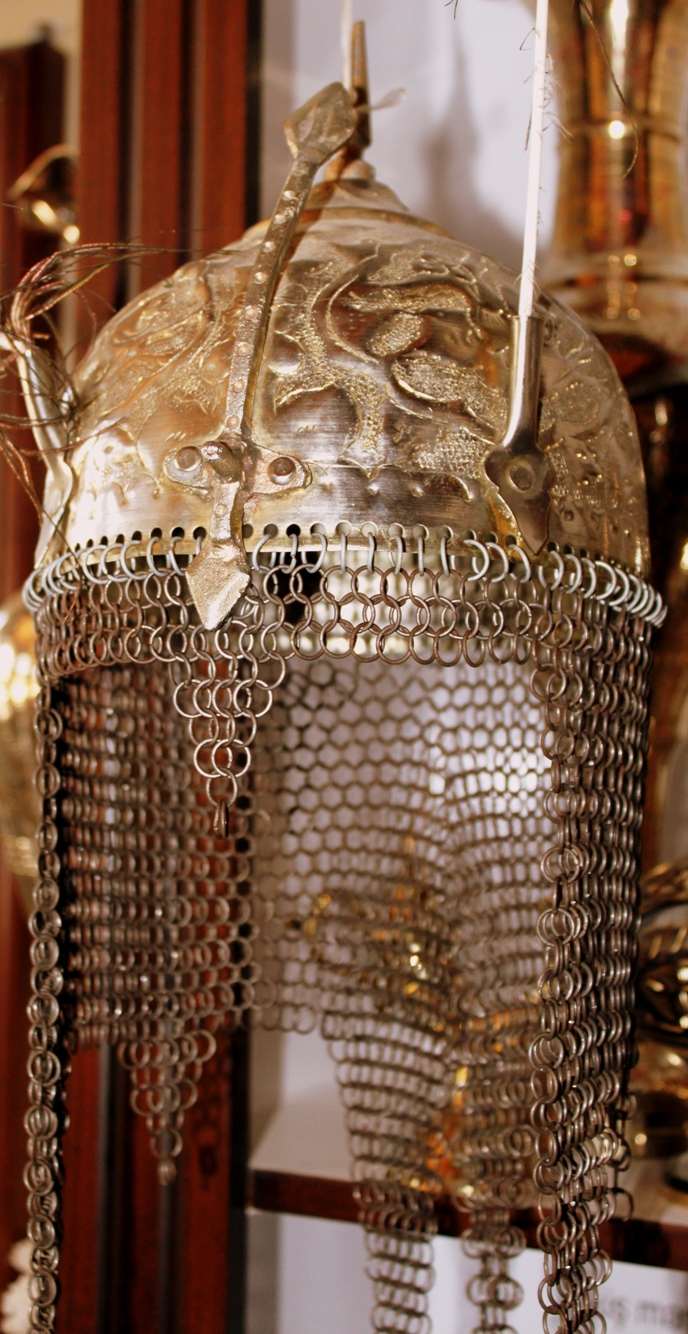

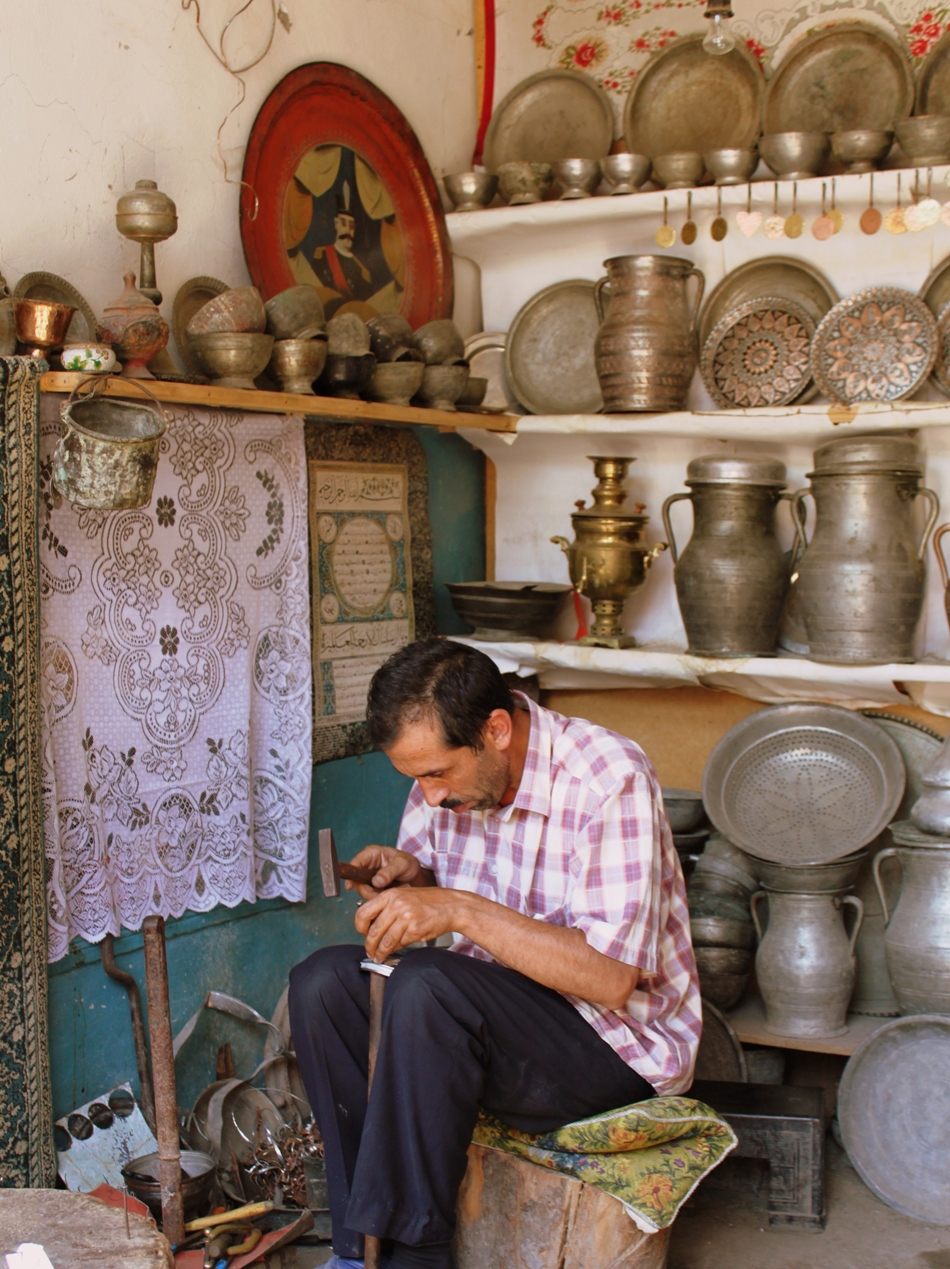

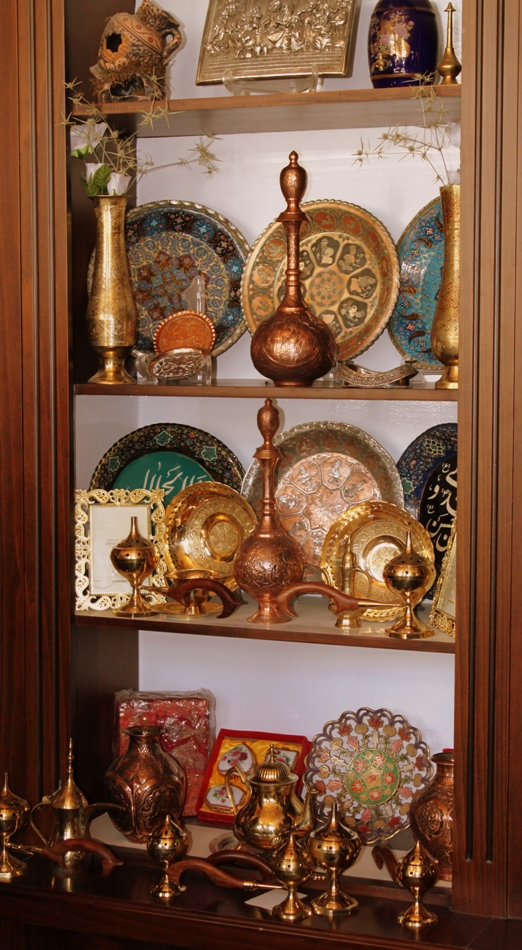

== See also ==
- Lahıc, Ismailli
- UNESCO Intangible Cultural Heritage List in Azerbaijan
