= Caucasian carpets and rugs =

Carpet and rug history

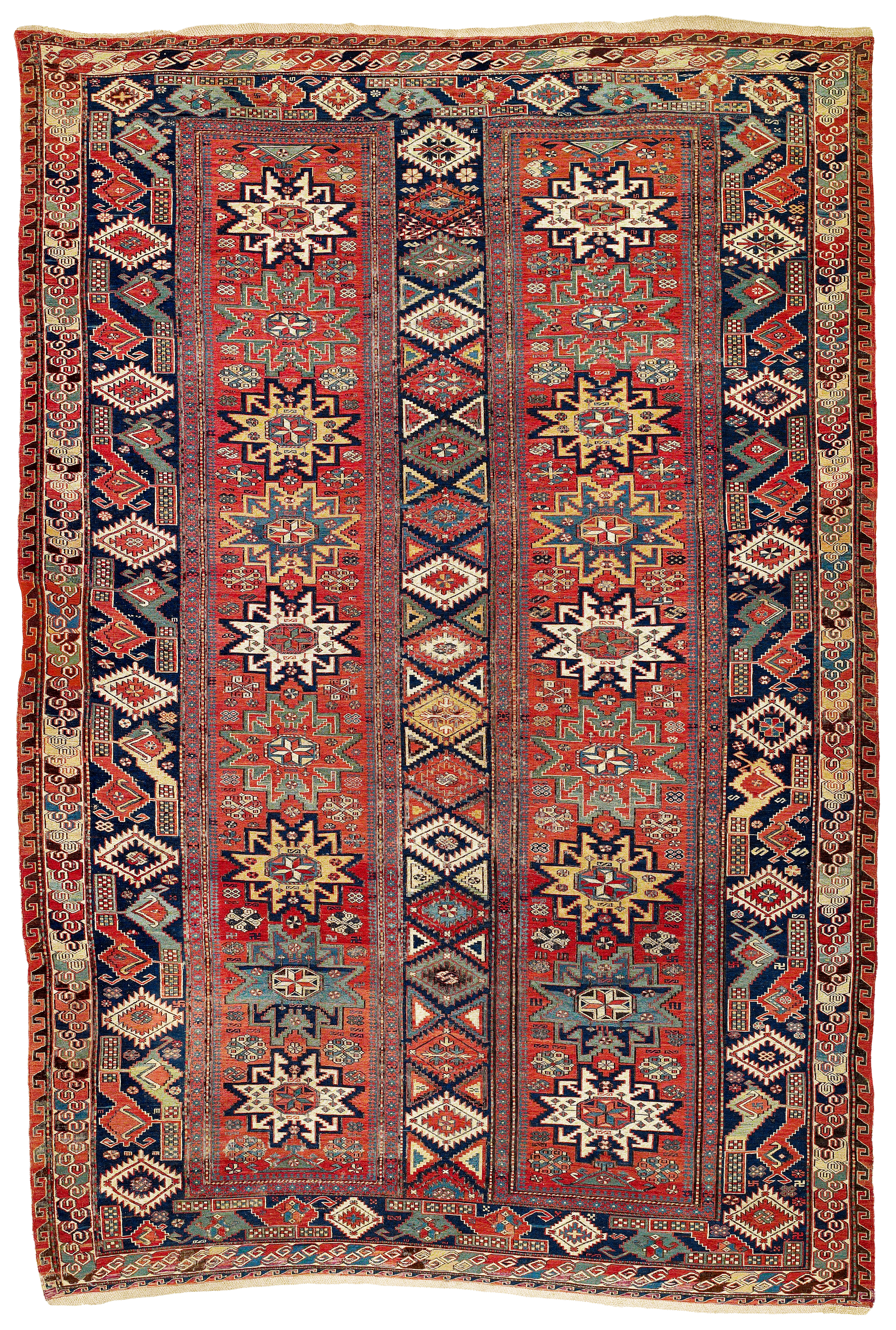
Soumak flat-weave rug from Quba Rayon or Daghestan, mid-19th century.

Caucasian carpets and rugs are primarily made in villages, rather than in cities. They are made from materials particular to individual tribal provinces, the rugs of the Caucasus normally display bold geometric designs in primary colors. Styles typical to the Caucasus region are Daghestan, Verne, Shirvan, Ganja, Kazakh, Karabagh, and Quba rugs. Several carpet styles from contemporary northwestern Iran also fall largely into this bracket, such as the Ardabil rugs.
