= Ganja rugs =

Category of Caucasian rugs from Gəncə, Azerbaijan

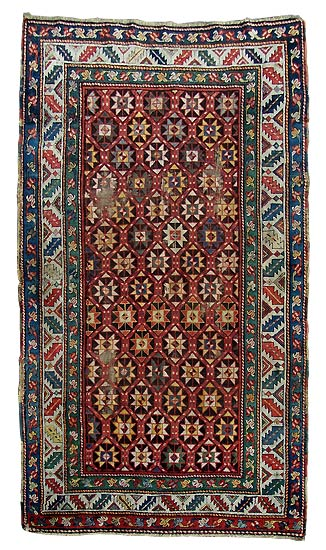
Ganja Rug with hexagonal lattice

Ganja rugs or Geunge rugs are a category of Caucasian rugs from the town of Gəncə (also written as Geunge, Gendje or Ganja) in Azerbaijan.

== Carpets ==
Ganja carpets were produced not only in the city of Ganja, but also in Garabaghli, Borsunlu, Shadyli, Garadagli, Shamkir and other carpet-making points. The carpets woven in Ganja were called “Ganja-city". The market price of such carpets was higher than the cost of Ganjacarpets made in the villages.

Ganja carpets' composition, color selection, and style differ from other Azerbaijani rugs. The first type of Ganja carpets is characterized by designs composed of octagons, stars, or three geometric medallions arranged on the carpets` longitudinal axis. The carpets` color is usually blue, dark blue and madder red. The intermediate area of the second type of Ganja carpets is decorated with several lakes. These lakes are often found in cross and octagonal forms.

== Gallery ==
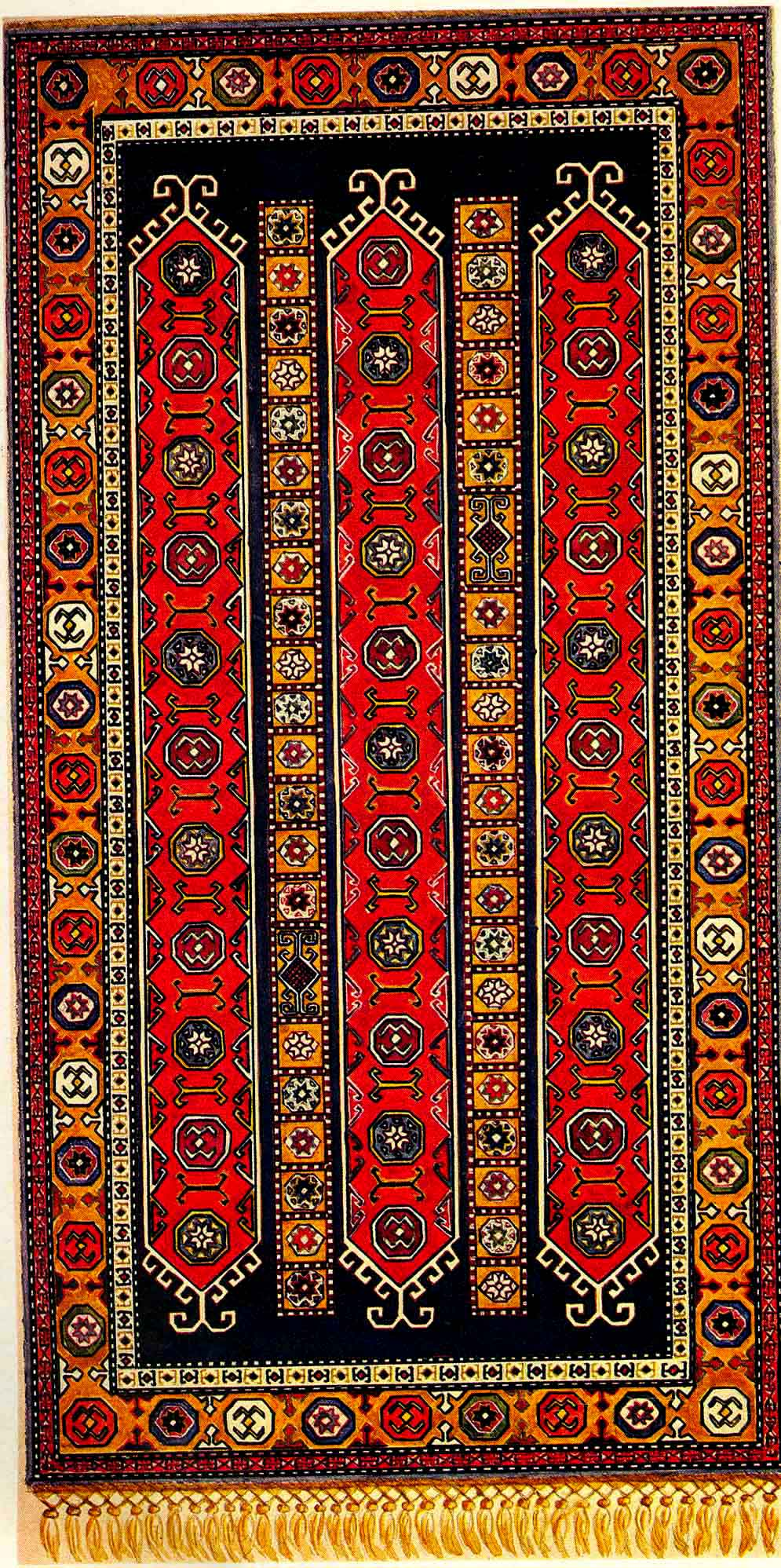
Ganja rug

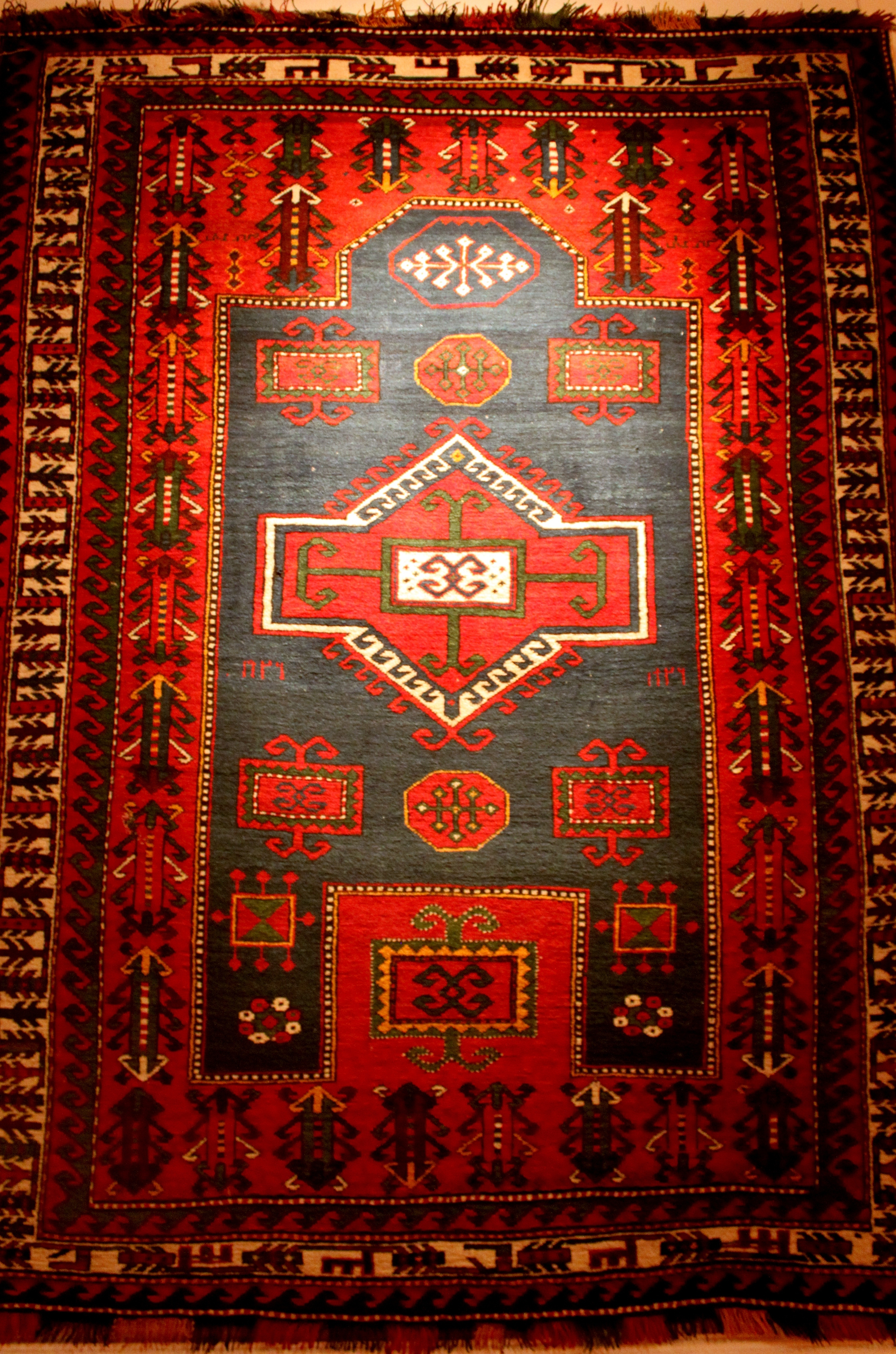
Damirchilar carpet, Ganja group of Azerbaijani rugs

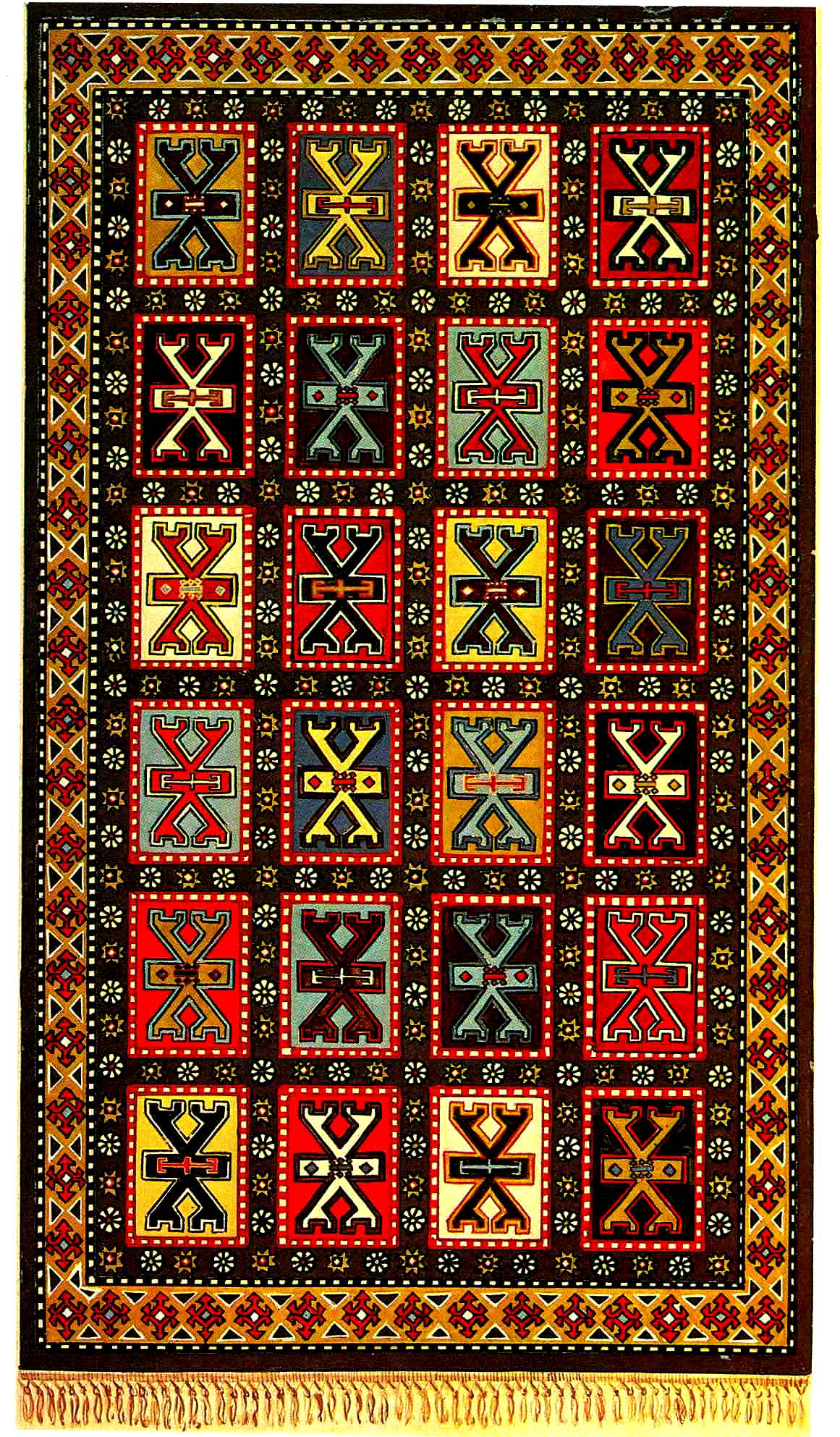
Gadim Ganja

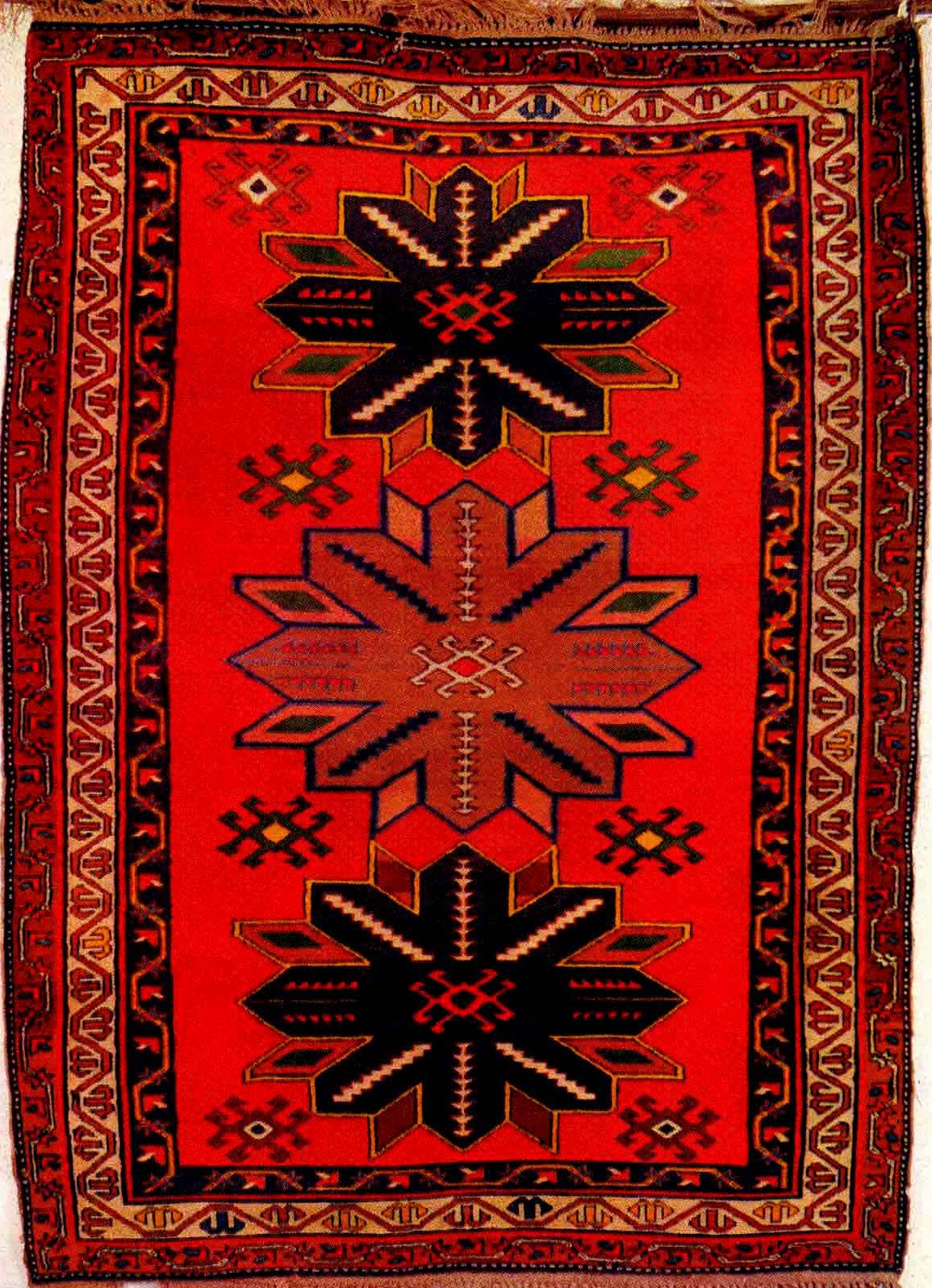
Ganja carpet

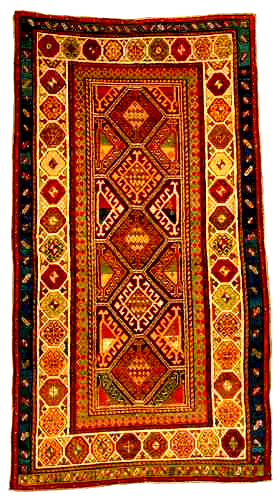
Ganja long rug

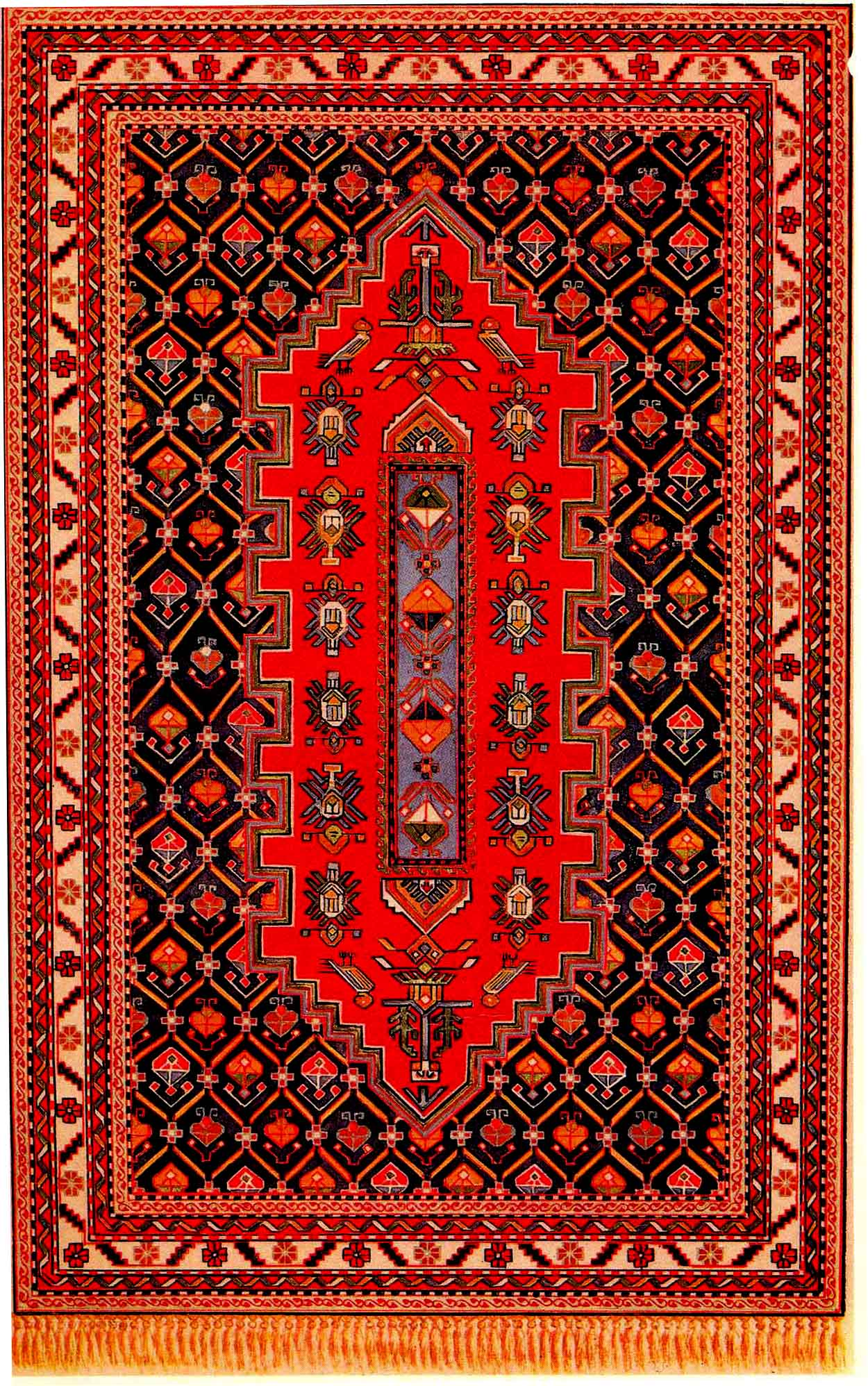
"Chayli" Ganja carpet

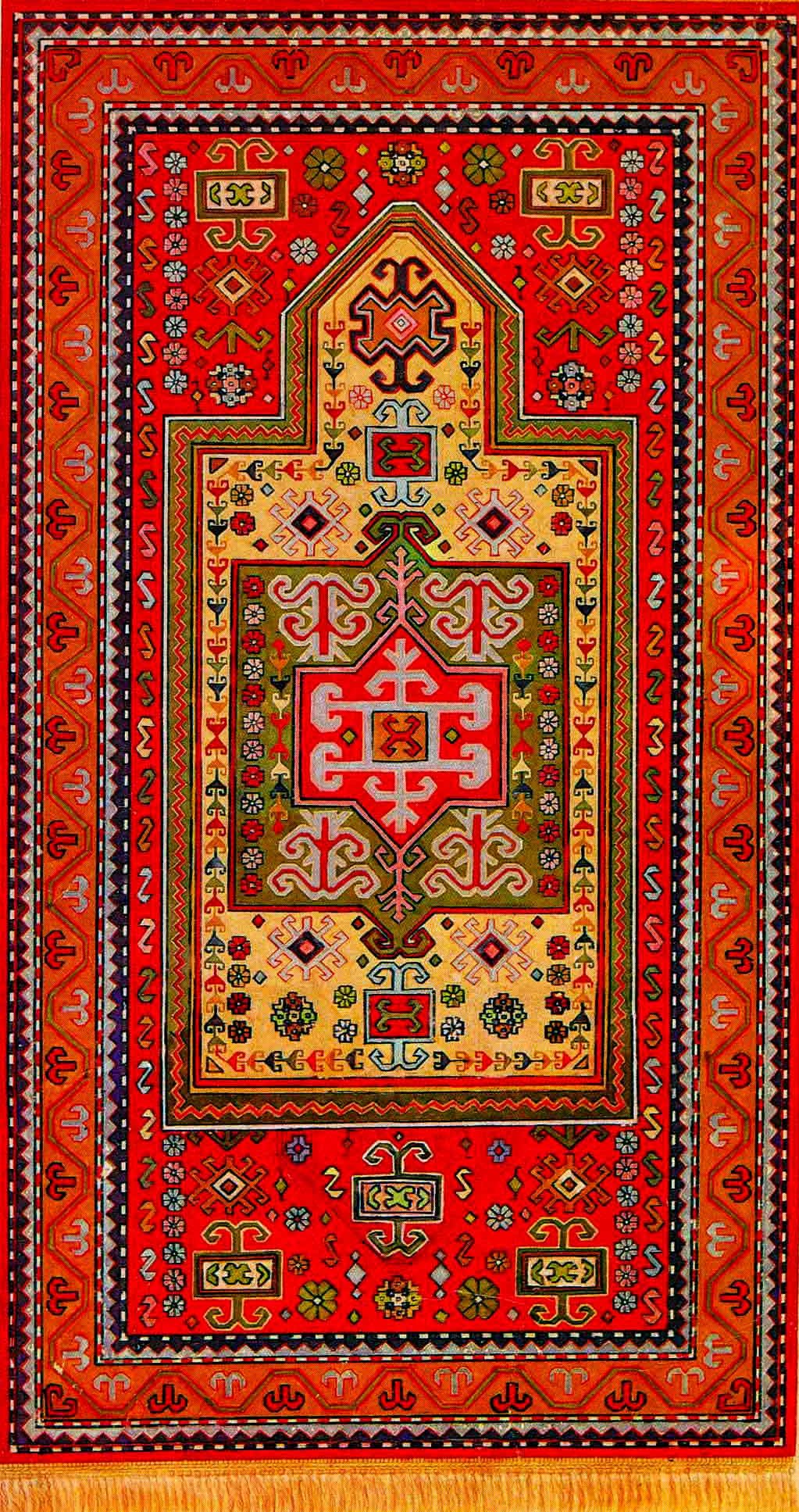
"Fakhrali" Ganja carpet

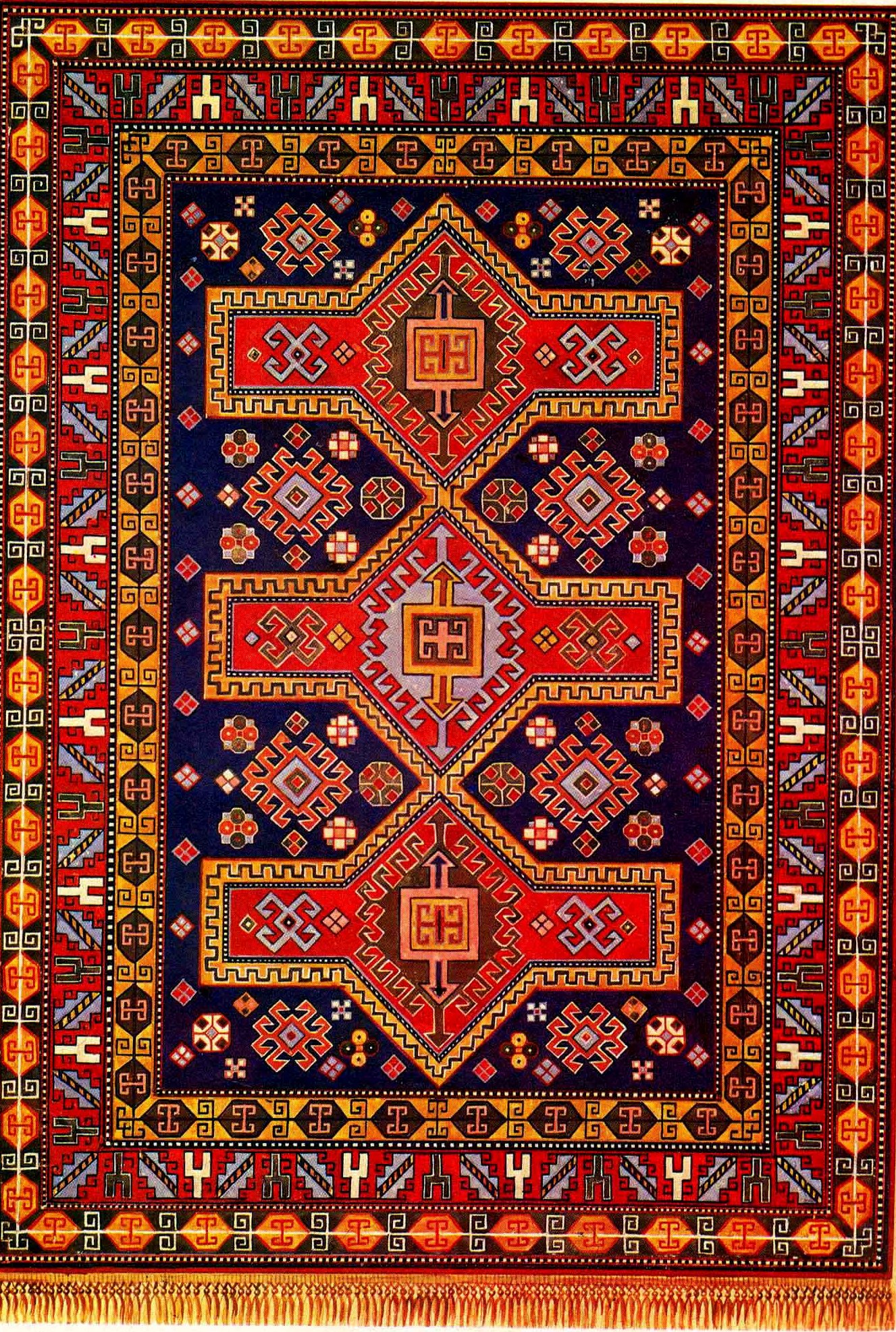
"Chirakhli" Ganja carpet
