= Gadim Minaret carpets =

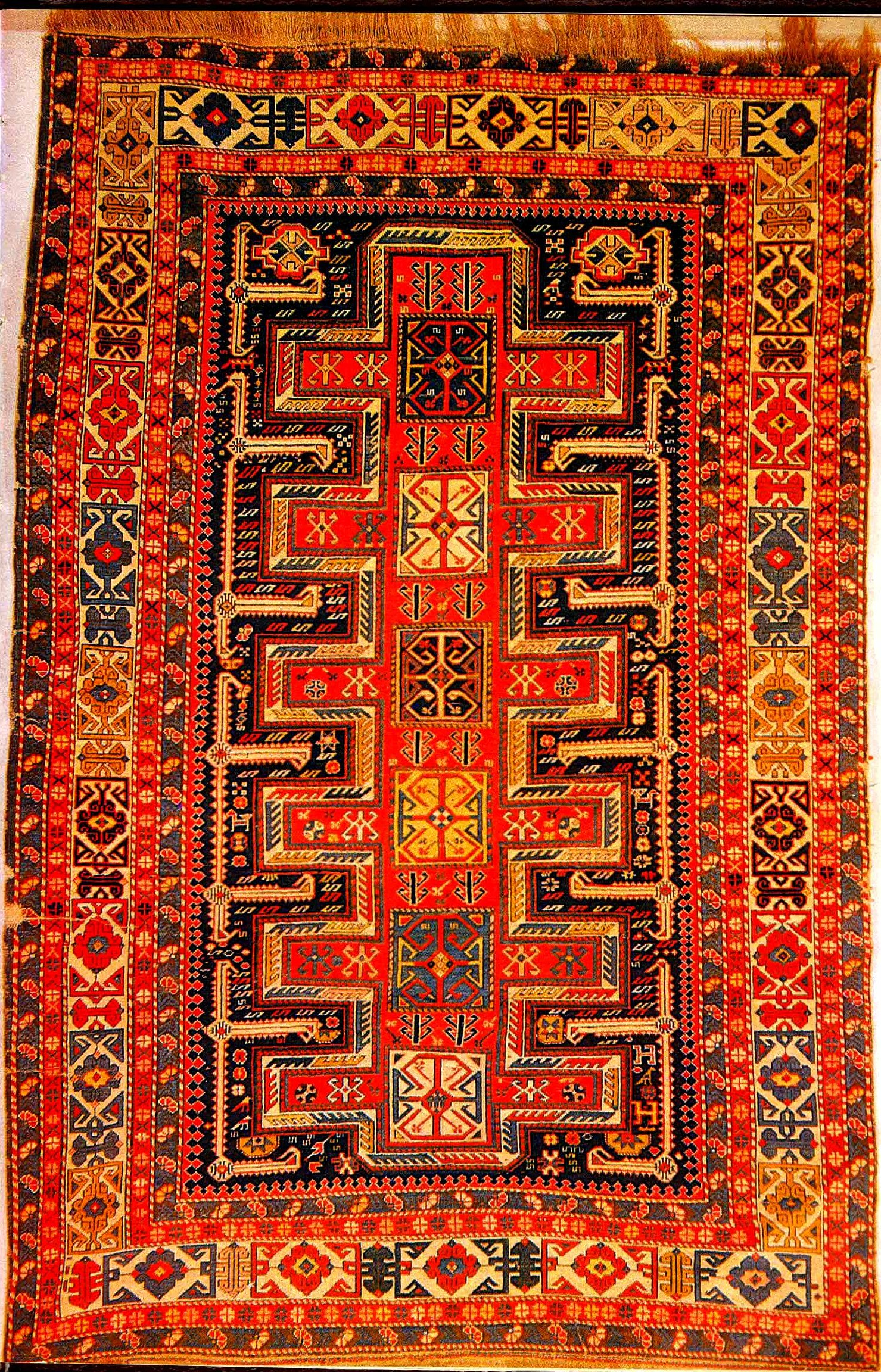
Gadim Minaret carpet (19th century). Azerbaijan Carpet Museum, Baku

Gadim Minare carpets — Azerbaijani carpets belonging to the Guba carpet-weaving school.

== Classification ==
It is mainly produced in the city of Guba. Some carpet weavers simply call it "Darayi" or "Salyan khilasi".

== Specifications ==
Ancient minaret carpets are among the excellent examples of Guba-Shirvan carpet weaving school.

The size of such carpets starts from 120x400 cm. Carpets are 145,000 to 200,000 per square meter, and the height of the loops is 5-7 mm.

== See also ==
- Azerbaijani rug
- Shabalyt buta carpet
- Gollu-chichi carpets
