= Gollu-chichi carpets =

Type of Azerbaijani carpets

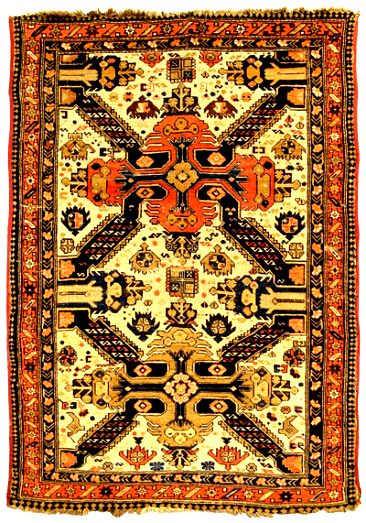
Qollu chichi carpet (19th century). Azerbaijan Carpet Museum, Baku

Gollu-chichi or Gollu carpets — Azerbaijani carpets belonging to the Guba school of carpet weaving.

== Classification ==
These carpets were woven for the first time in Karabakh. Later this type of carpets in the villages were woven in the villages of Nabur in Gobustan and Derachichi in Guba. The weaving of these carpets spread from here to other regions of Guba. Currently, apart from Azerbaijan, these carpets are also woven in Dagestan and Turkmenistan. This composition gained fame in the Near and Middle East, and later on a wider scale, for its colour and beauty. Some art experts call these carpets "Shirvani" and "Dagestan". Craftsmen from Karabakh called this carpet "Machine", and those from Shirvan called it "Gollu" or "Gollu gol". Carpet weavers from Chichi call these carpets "Gollu chichi" or "Isbigulchichi".

== Artistic features ==
This composition, created in the Azerbaijan carpet weaving school in 1775-1800, stands out for its construction and decorative elements. For two hundred years, this composition has existed under different names and in different forms. This type of carpet is related to the production of thick fabric developed in Russia, not related to carpet making. At the beginning of the 20th century, the demand for large Karabakh carpets with a large thick weave at the Nizhny Novgorod fair and the Istanbul market decreased. There is already a growing demand for "Gollu chichi" carpets, which are relatively small Guba carpets with a softer texture.

The composition of "Gollu Chichi" carpets is composed of several flowers in the middle area of the carpet. They are arranged by 4 diagonally extending and intersecting branches (arm – gol). This is where the name of the carpet comes from. The margins of the carpets use different margin strips of the same group of carpets. Margins called "Dolangach" or "chakmaq" are widely used. Although the "Dolangach" margin does not correspond to the "Gollu chichi" carpet, this margin, which resembles the letter S and consists of the "water" element that is part of the margin, is widely used in carpets.

== Technical characteristics ==
"Gollu Chichi" carpets are usually from 120x180 cm to 135x210 cm. Sometimes larger sizes are found. The density of loops varies from 40-50 to 50-60, and their height is 4-6 mm. The biggest factor that brought popularity to "Gollu Chichi" rugs was their appearance on a white background.

== See also ==
- Shabalyt buta carpet
- Gadim Minaret carpets
- Karabakh carpet
