= Shusha Carpet Museum =

- Şuşa Xalça Muzeyi
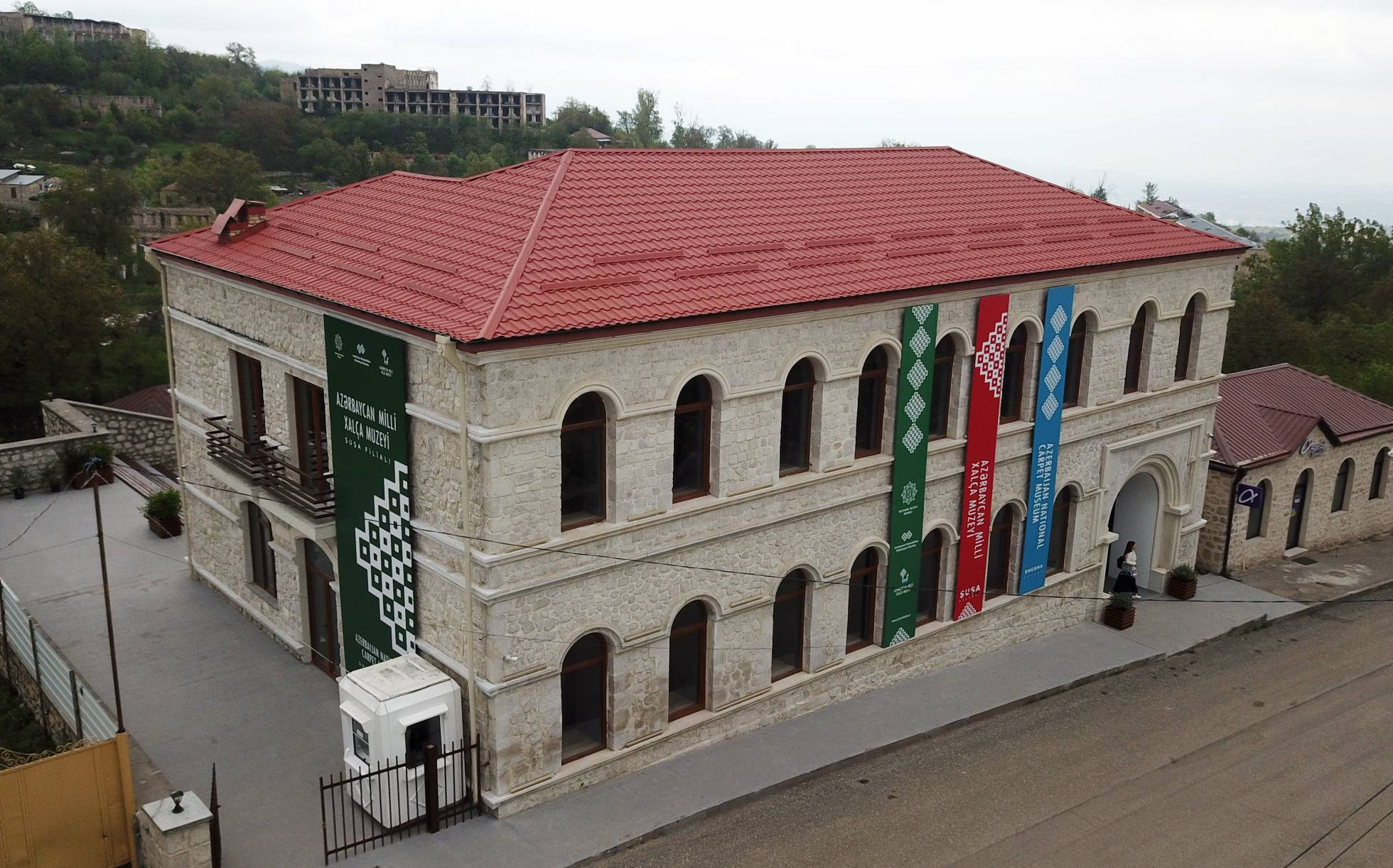
- Established: 26 September 1985
- Location: Until 1992, in Shusha, in the mansion belonging to General Samad bey Mehmandarov; After 1992, in Baku, Azerbaijan
- Type: carpet museum

Shusha Carpet Museum is the Shusha branch of the State Museum of Azerbaijani Carpets and Applied Art, established by the Order of the Ministry of Culture of the Azerbaijan SSR No. 502 of September 26, 1985, to study, preserve and live the traditions of Karabakh carpet weaving. The branch began its activity on May 19, 1987, in the 18th-century mansion belonging to General Samad bey Mehmandarov.

During the period in which the Republic of Artsakh controlled the city, the museum's collection was relocated to the Azerbaijan Carpet Museum in Baku.

After Azerbaijan took control of Shusha in the 2020 Nagorno-Karabakh ceasefire agreement, the museum announced plans to return to its original location in Shusha. The restored museum reopened in 2023.

== See also ==
- Shushi Carpet Museum, the Armenian institution which operated in the city from 2011 to 2020
