= Shushi Carpet Museum =

Museum in Shusha, Azerbaijan

- Շուշիի գորգերի թանգարան
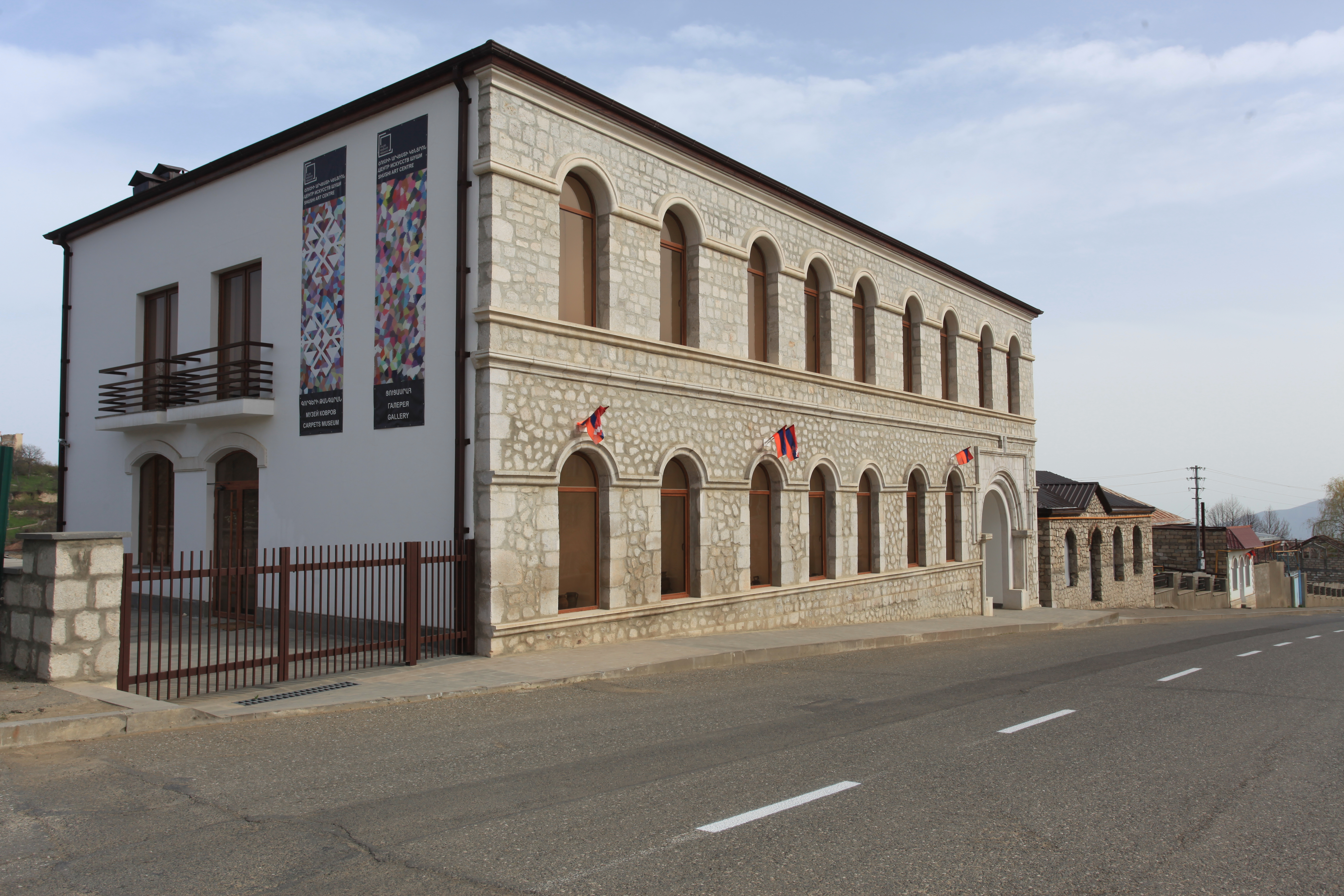
- Established: 2011–2013
- Location: Yerevan, Armenia
- Coordinates: 39°45′36″N 46°44′50.6″E
- Founder: Vardan Astsatryan

Shushi Carpet Museum (Armenian: Շուշիի գորգերի թանգարան) was a museum in Shusha that operated while the city was under the control of the Republic of Artsakh. It was founded by Vardan Astsatryan in 2011 and opened to the public in 2013.

The museum has been closed since Azerbaijan retook control of the city in 2020. 71 rugs and carpets from the museum's collection are now on display in Yerevan at the National Museum-Institute of Architecture after Alexander Tamanyan.

The building now houses the Azerbaijani Shusha Carpet Museum.

== History ==
The founding private collection included old carpets made by famous Armenian carpet weavers from different villages in Armenia and Nagorno-Karabakh. The collection comprised old Armenian carpets found and bought by its founder, Vardan Astsatryan.

Until November 1, 2020, the museum had two buildings under its supervision. A fund was established in 2011 by donors from the United States. In 2012, a proper building was designated for displaying the carpets given by donors from Moscow, Russia.

The museum had carpets on display, as well as traditional Historical and cultural artifacts. These artifacts received expert evaluation, underwent restoration and then were put on display.

Until the end of October 2020, the museum consisted of about three hundred (300) carpets and flat weaves. This original collection had dated from the 17th century to the beginning of the 20th century. The majority of the collection presented traditional Karabakh carpet-weaving and Armenian carpet-weaving styles. In addition to the locally woven carpets, there were few rugs, carpets, and flat weaves from Turkman, Afghan and Persian in the museum's collection. There were also Russian cultural artifacts in the museum. During his visit to the museum in August 2013, the President of the Republic of Artsakh Bako Sahakyan stated that the carpet museum plays an important role in preserving our national traditions and values and also for the development of tourism.

On October 29, 2020, an explosion of a large rocket, amidst heavy shelling of the city of Shushi (Azerbaijani: Şuşa) by Azerbaijani Armed Forces during the 2020 Nagorno-Karabakh war, damaged the museum buildings. On November 1, 2020, the most valuable items of the collection (about 160 carpets and rugs) were evacuated to Yerevan (Armenia) to avoid further destruction. The remainder of the collection, consisting of 100–120 carpets as well as other cultural artifacts were left in Shusha.

Currently, the collection is on display in the National Museum-Institute of Architecture after Alexander Tamanyan and History Museum of Armenia, both in Yerevan.

== Gallery ==
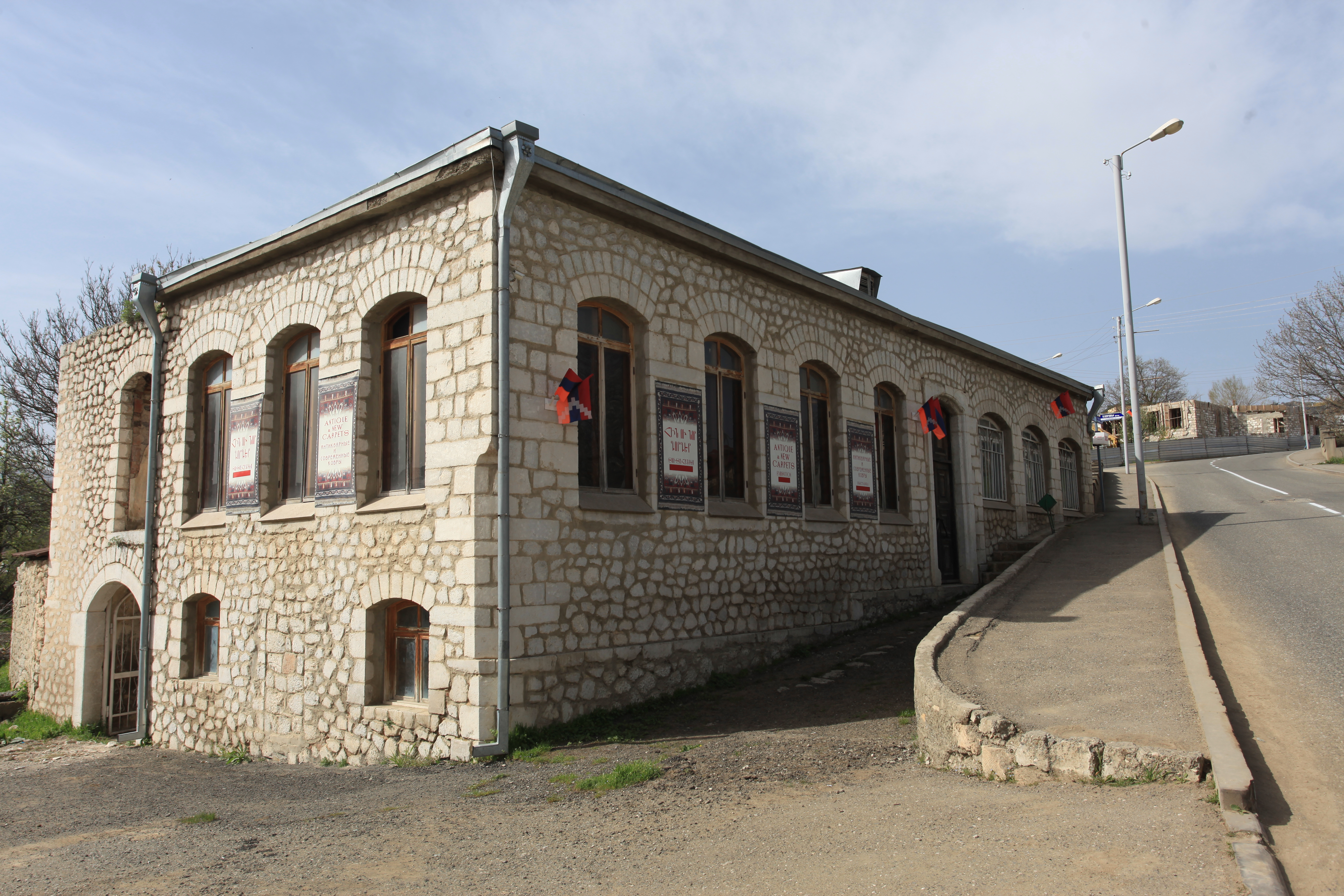

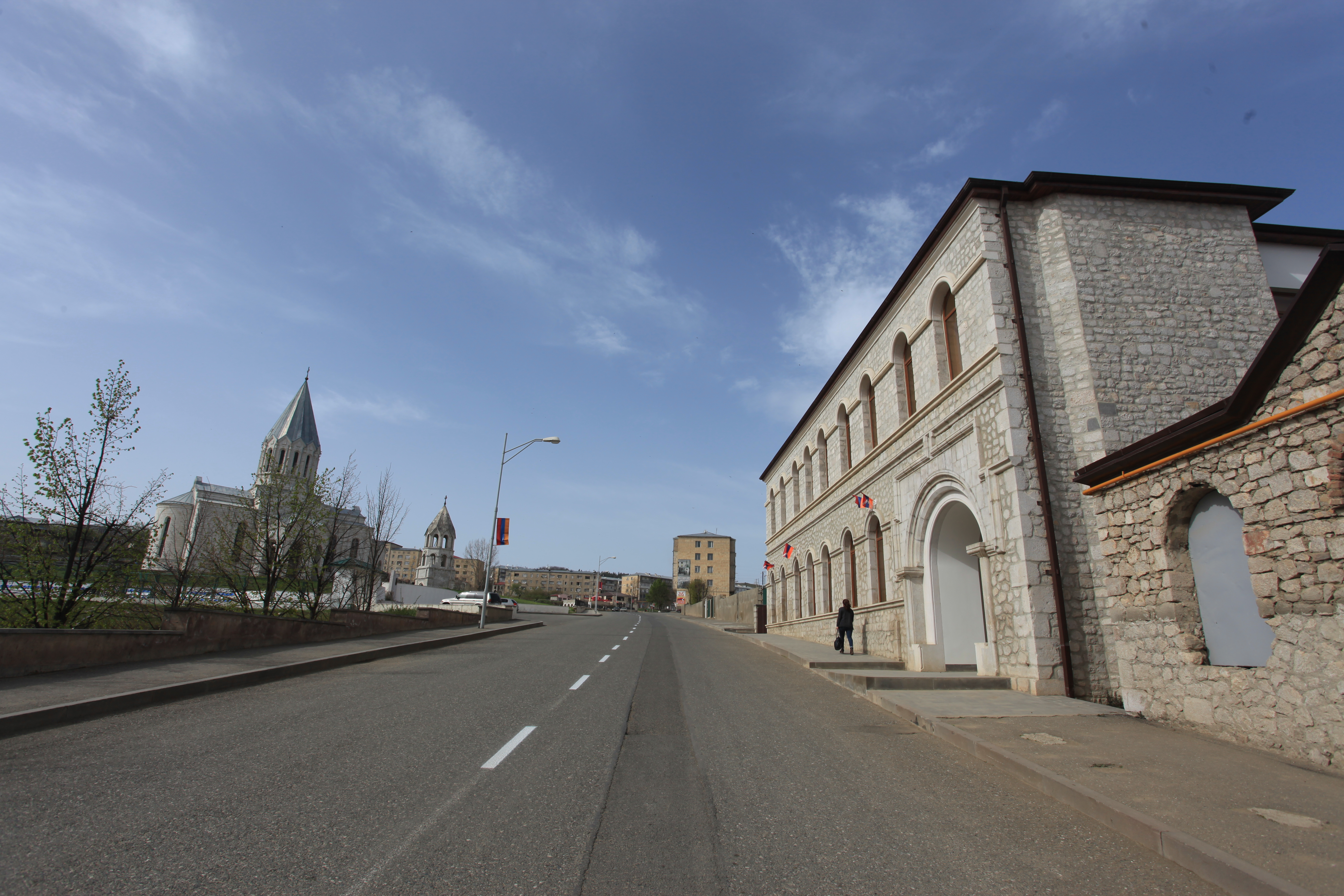

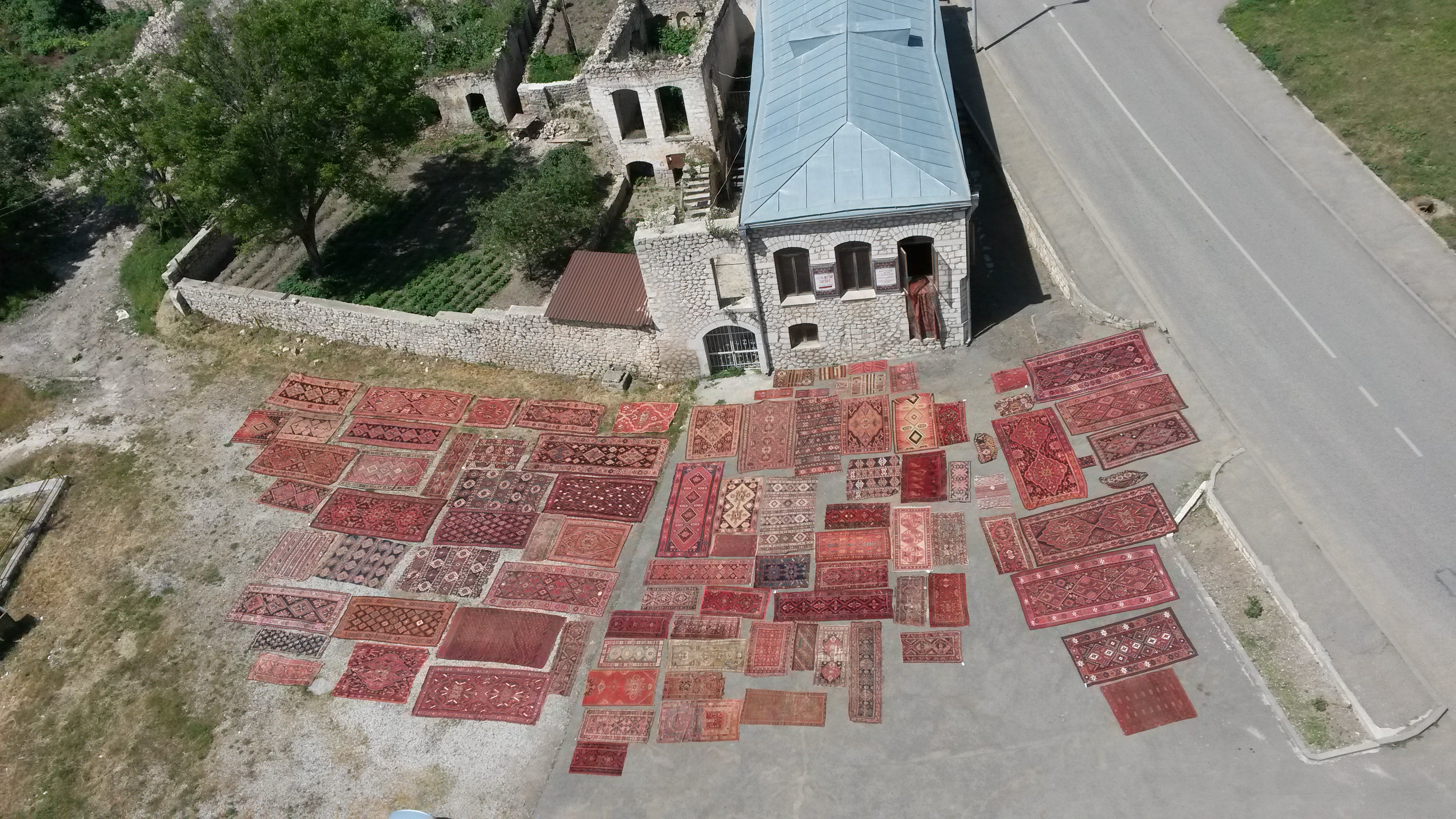

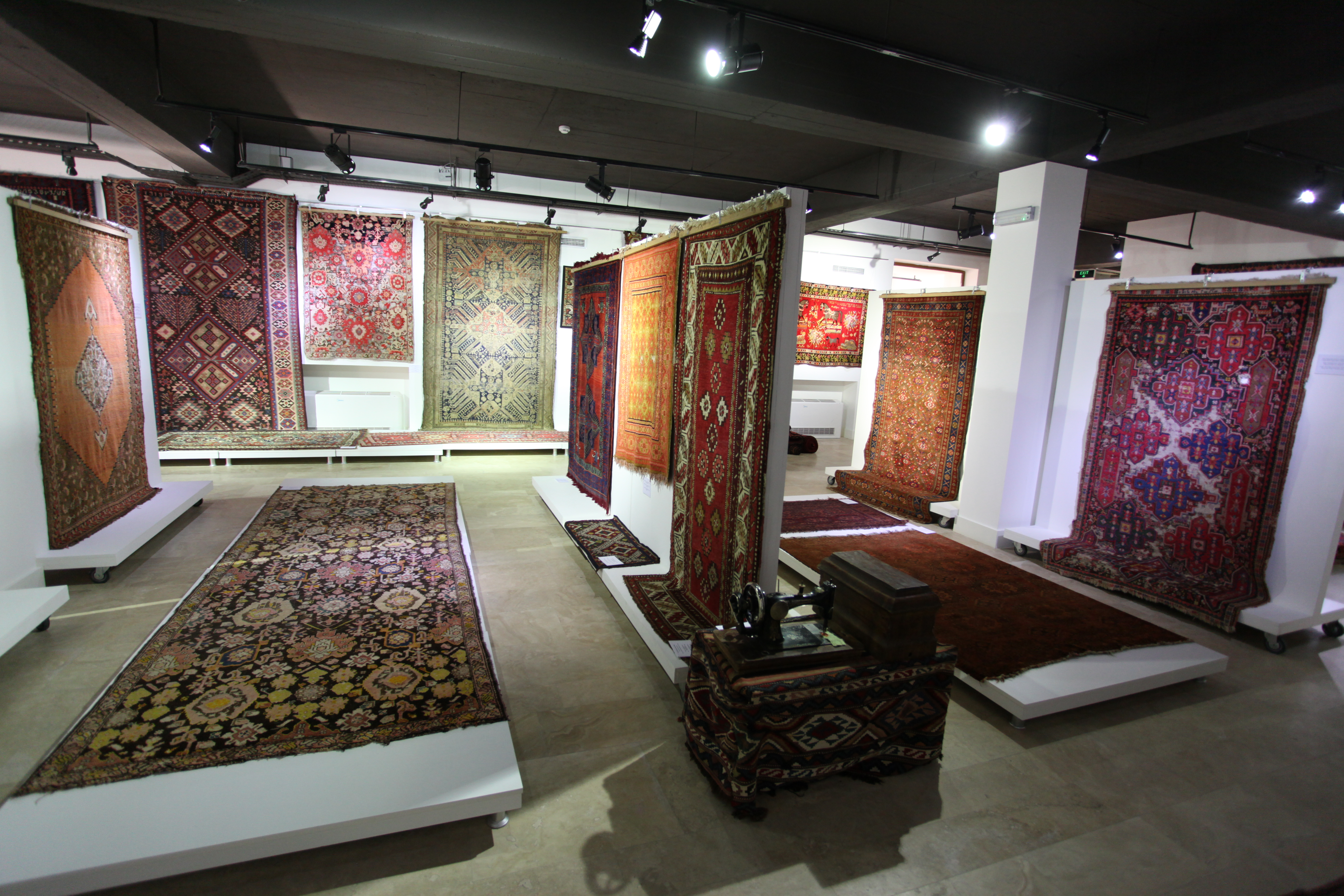

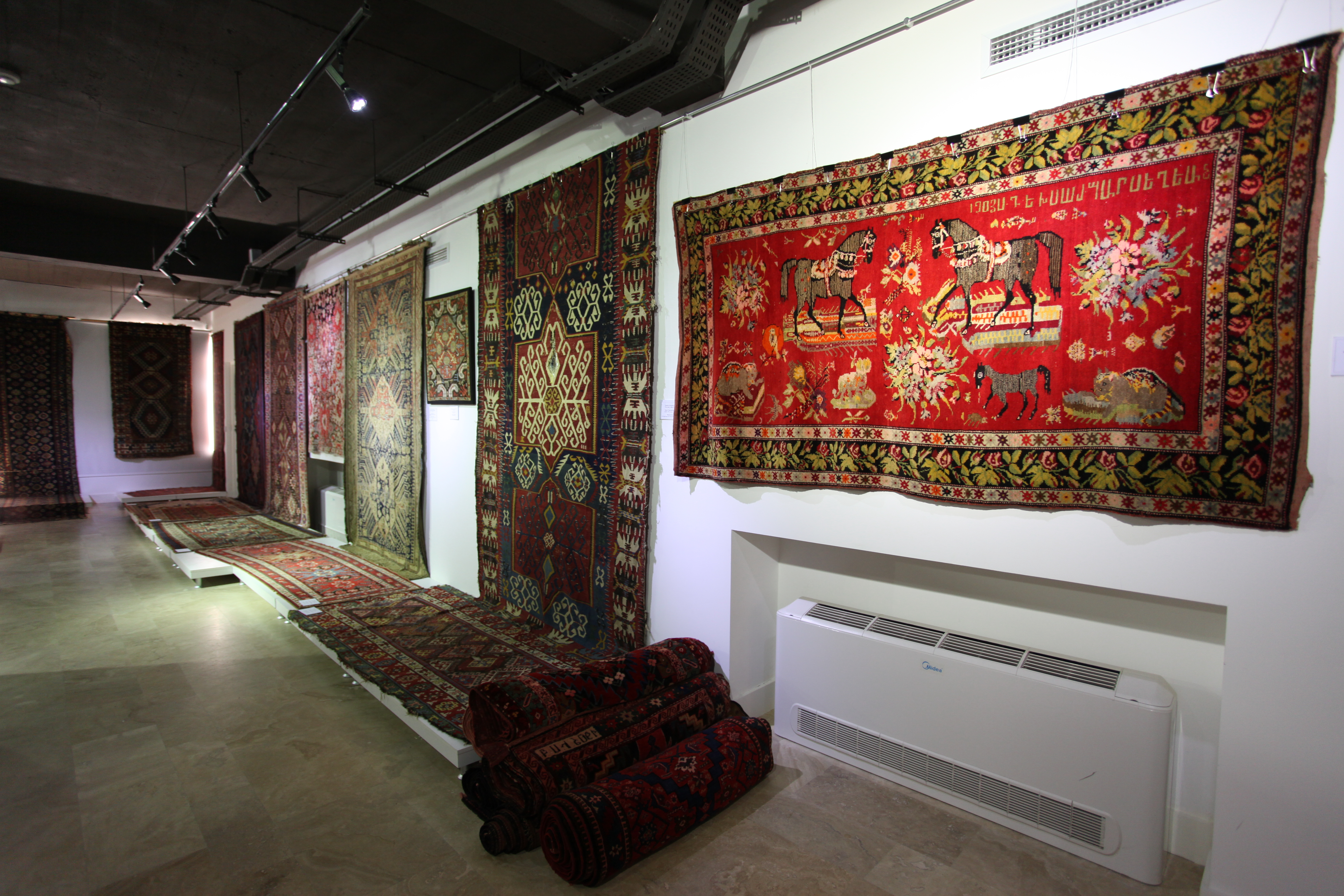

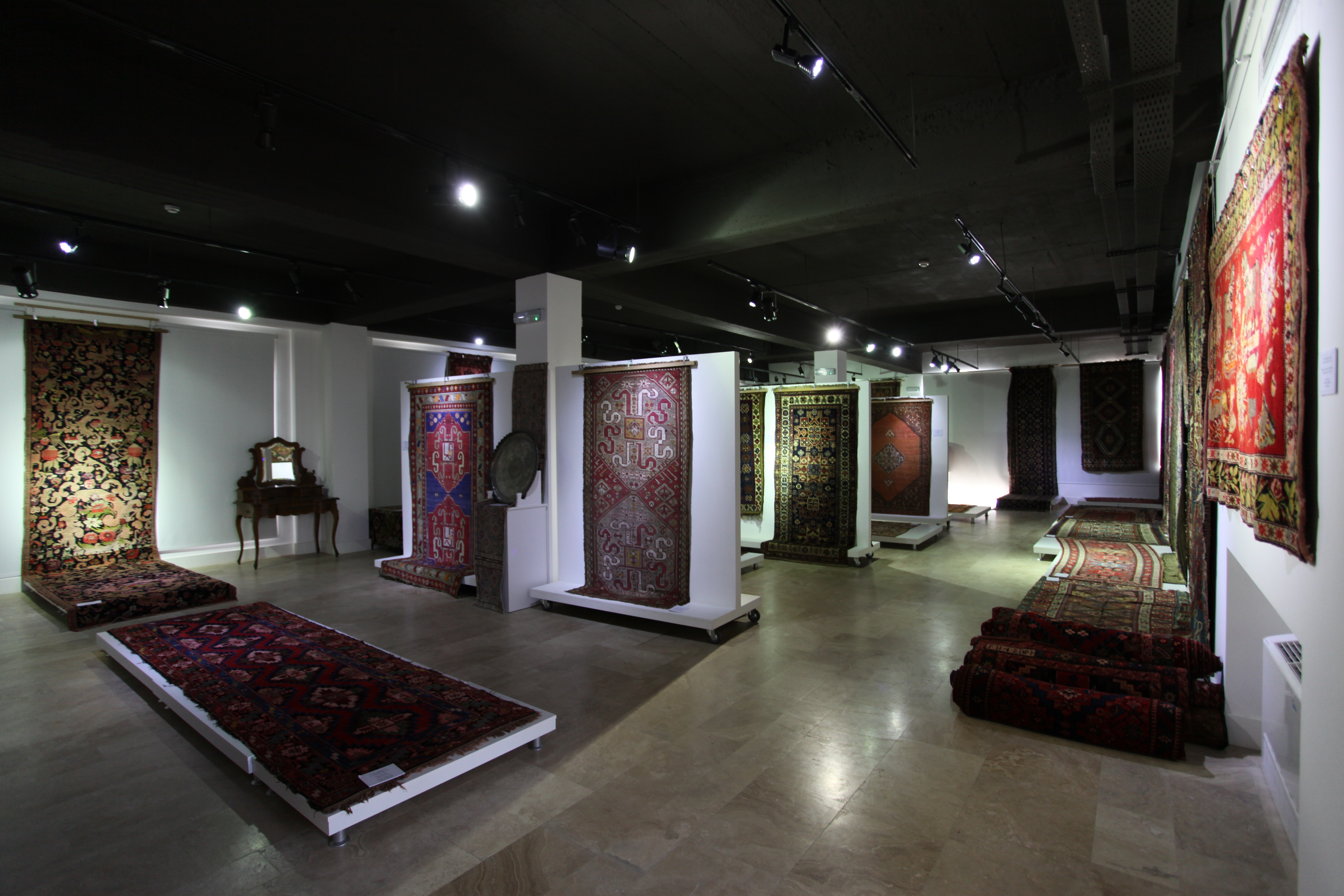

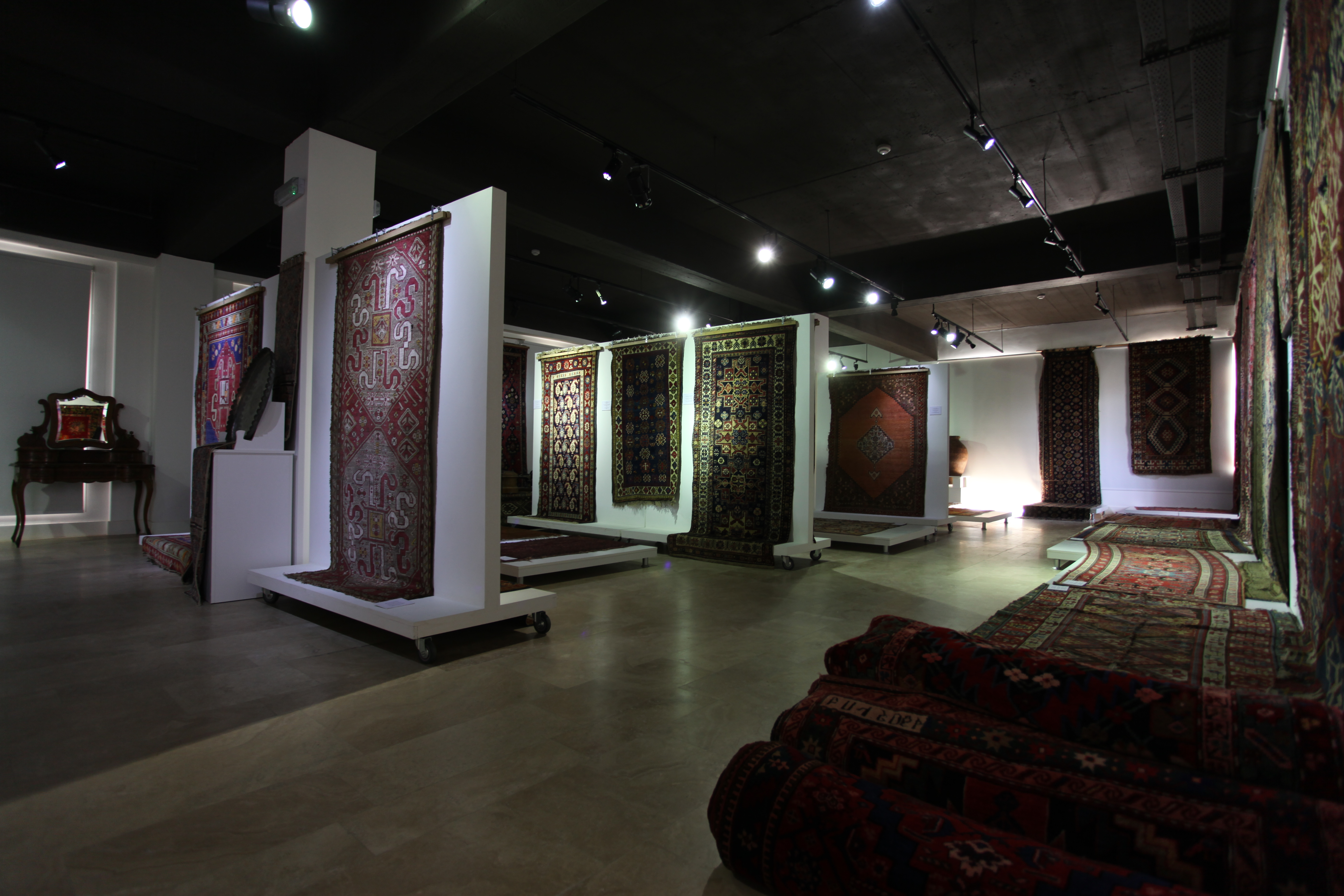

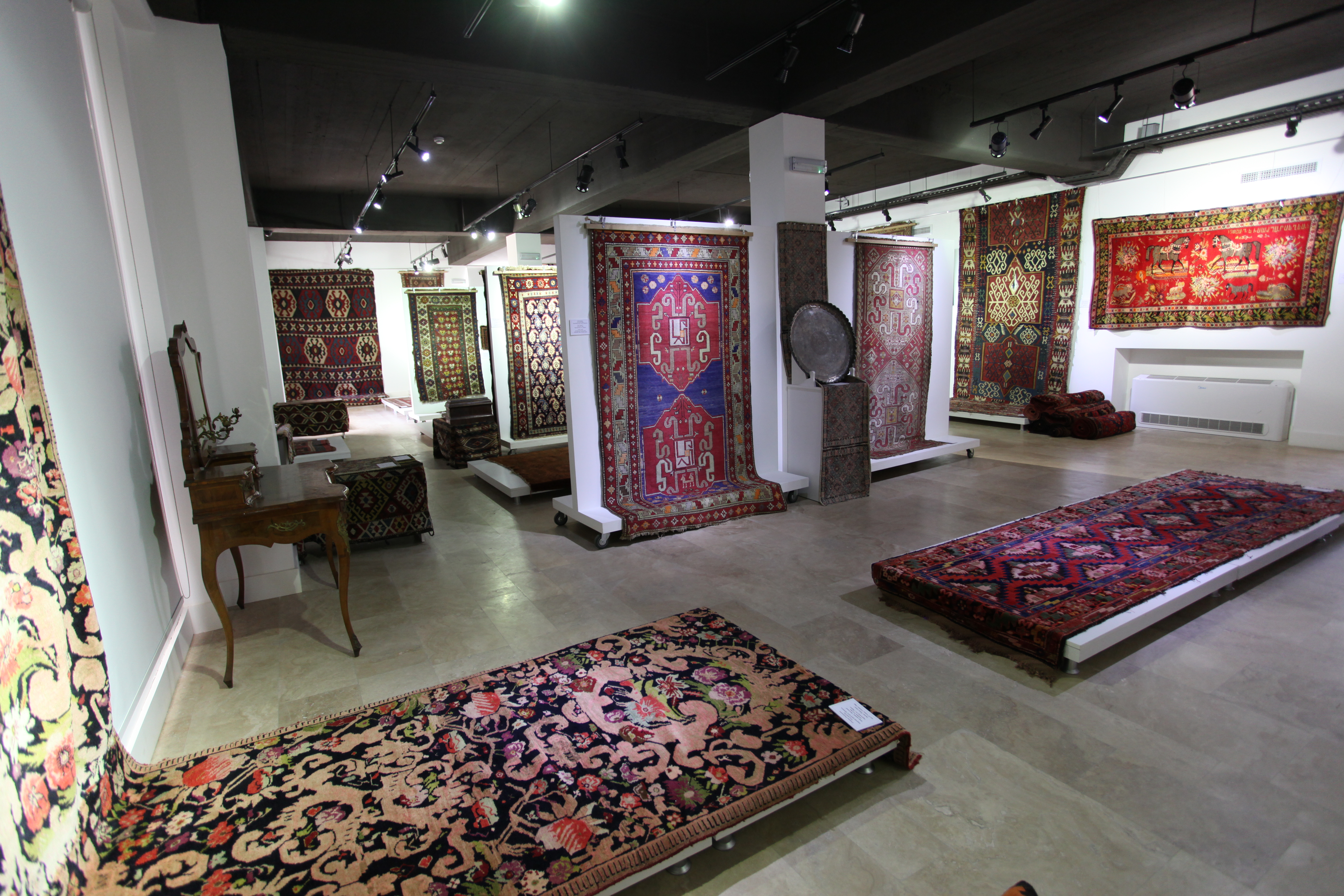

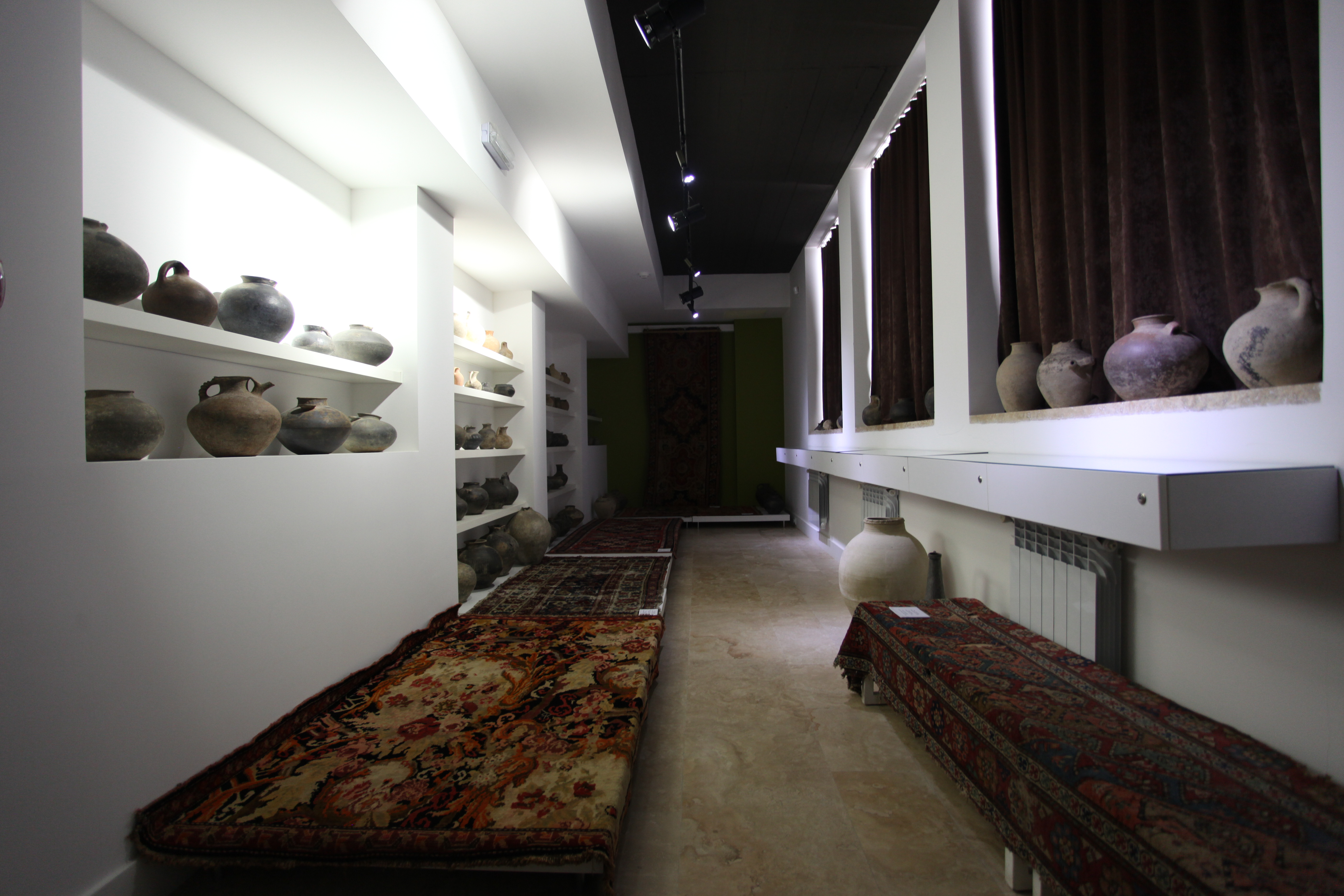

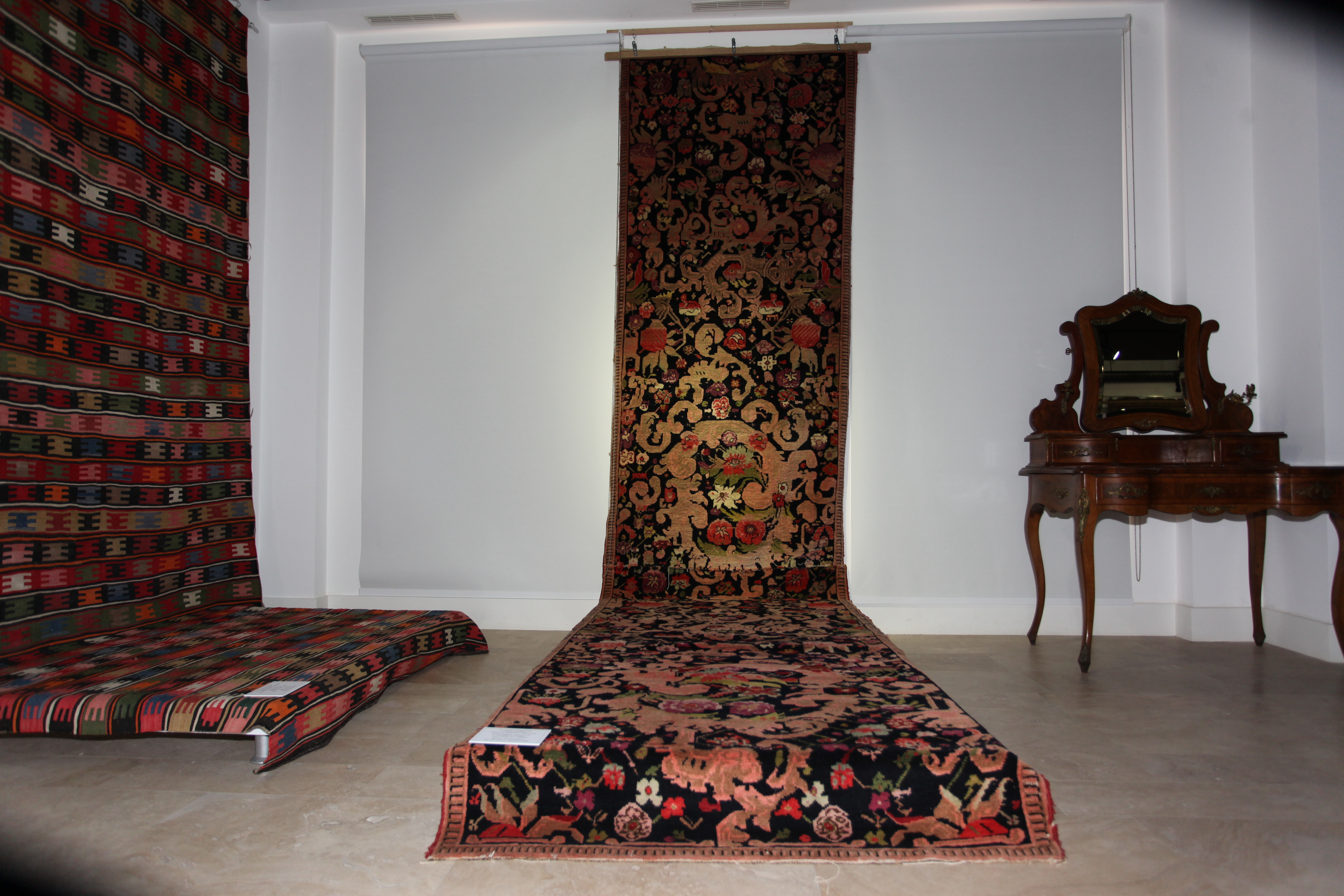

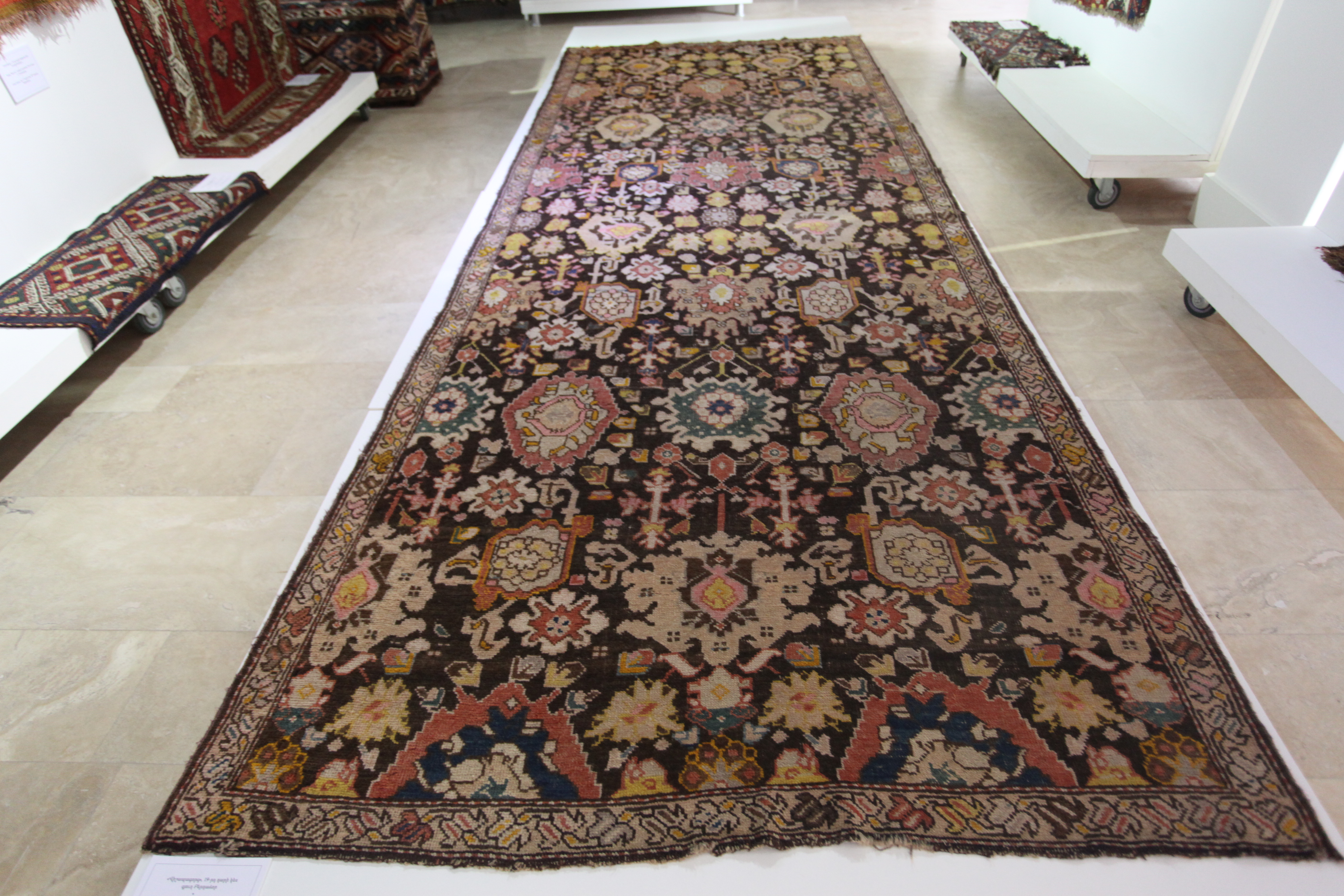

== See also ==
- Shusha Carpet Museum, the Azerbaijani institution which operated in same building from 1985 to 1992, and again since 2023.
