= Azerbaijani carpet =

Rugs made in Azerbaijan

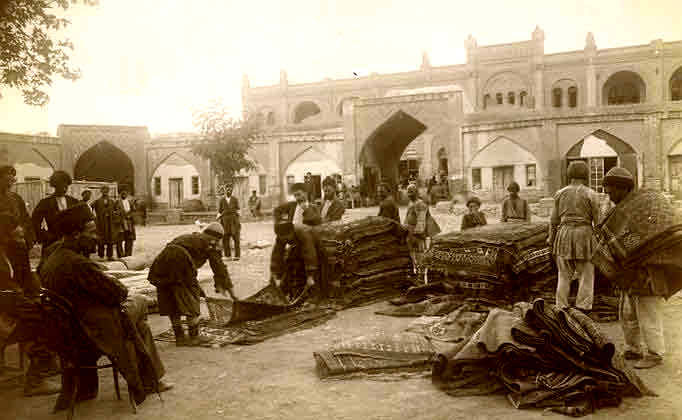
The rug trade in Ganja, Azerbaijan in the late 19th century.

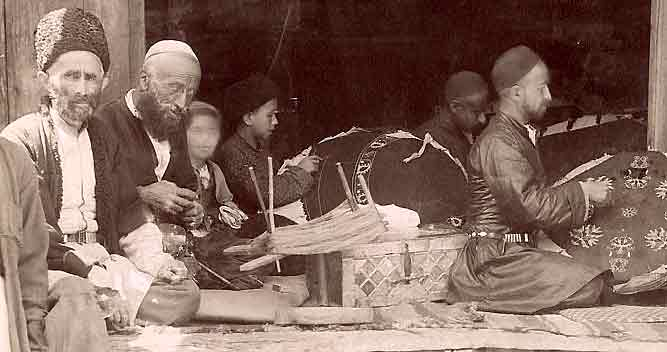
Carpet manufacturing in Ganja in the early 20th century.

Azerbaijani carpet (Azerbaijani: Azərbaycan xalçası) is a traditional carpet (rug) made in Azerbaijan. The Azerbaijani carpet is a handmade textile of various sizes, with a dense texture and a pile or pile-less surface, whose patterns are characteristic of Azerbaijan's many carpet-making regions. Traditionally, the carpets were used in Azerbaijan to cover floors, decorate interior walls, sofas, chairs, beds and tables.

Carpet making is a family tradition transferred orally and through practice, with carpet making and rug making being solely a women's occupation. In the past, every young girl had to learn the art of weaving carpets, and the carpets she wove became a part of her dowry. In the case of a newly married son, it was his mother who wove a large rug for his new household. Traditionally, men sheared the sheep in the spring and autumn, while women collected dyestuffs and spun and dyed the yarn in the spring, summer and autumn.

Peer-reviewed International Journal of Heritage Studies explains: "While it is difficult to find Azerbaijani carpet as a category on its own before the 1930s, Baku was known as a convenient place ‘for obtaining a constant and abundant supply of genuine article [Oriental carpets]’ (Coxon 1884, 2)."

In November 2010, the Azerbaijani carpet was proclaimed a Masterpiece of Intangible Heritage by UNESCO.

== Gallery ==
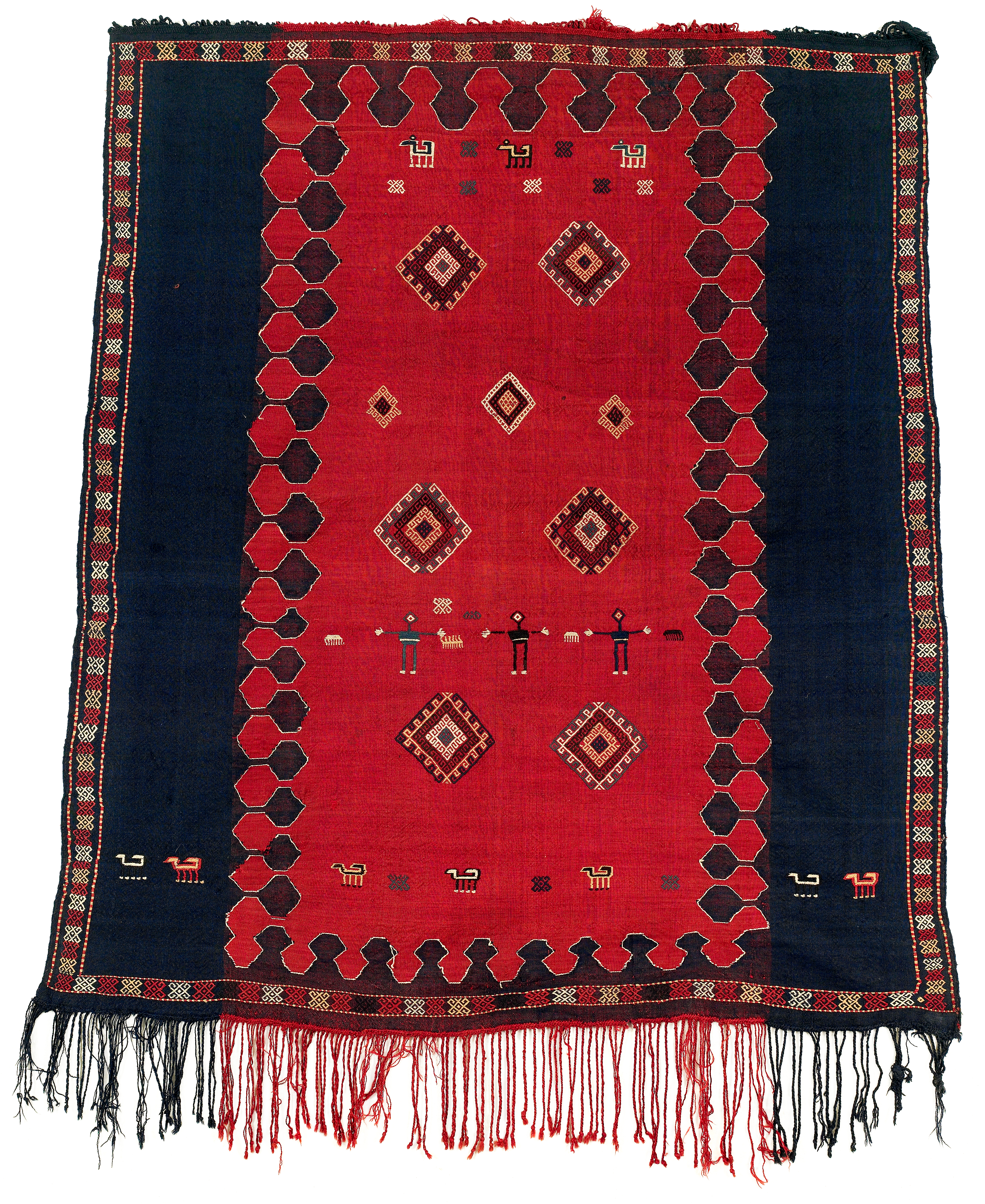
A 19th century Azeri shadda.

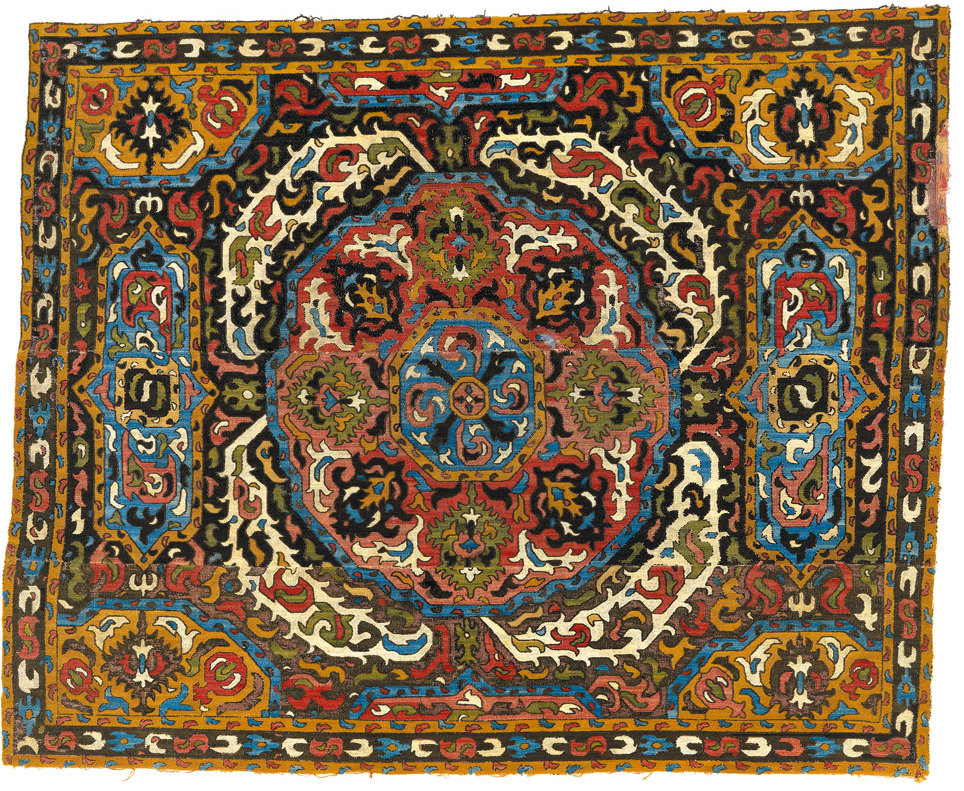
Silk embroidery, 17th–18th century.

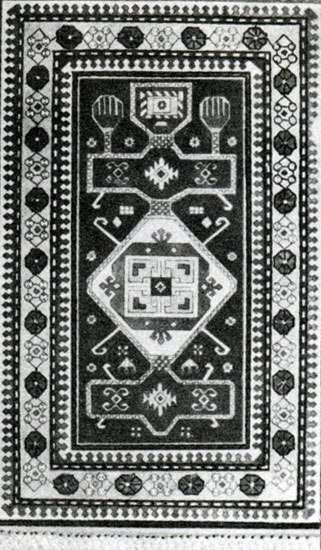
Prayer rug from Shusha. 19th century.

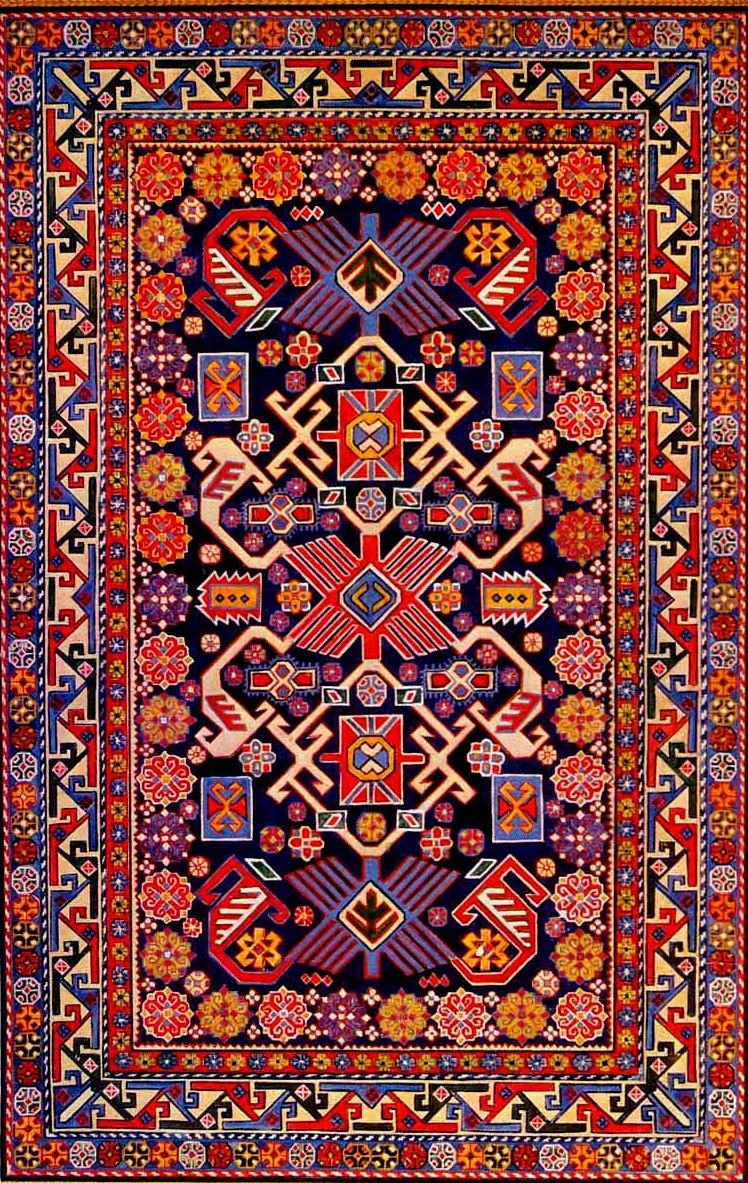
An Azerbaijani carpet of the Shirvan group from Bijo village, mid-19th century

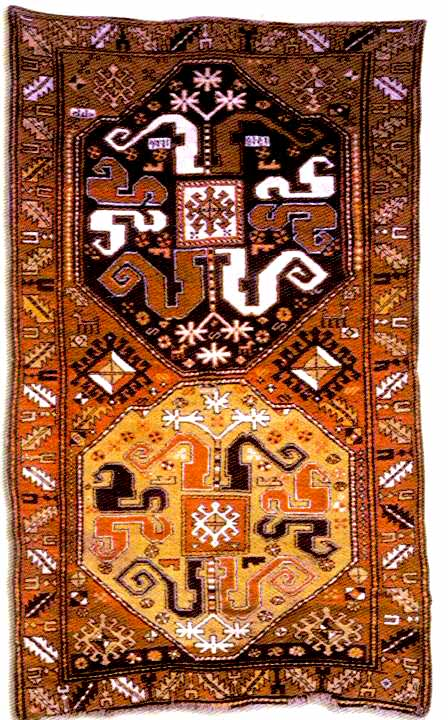
A Karabakh carpet of the Malibayli sub-group. Malibayli village of Shusha, 1813

== In culture and economy ==
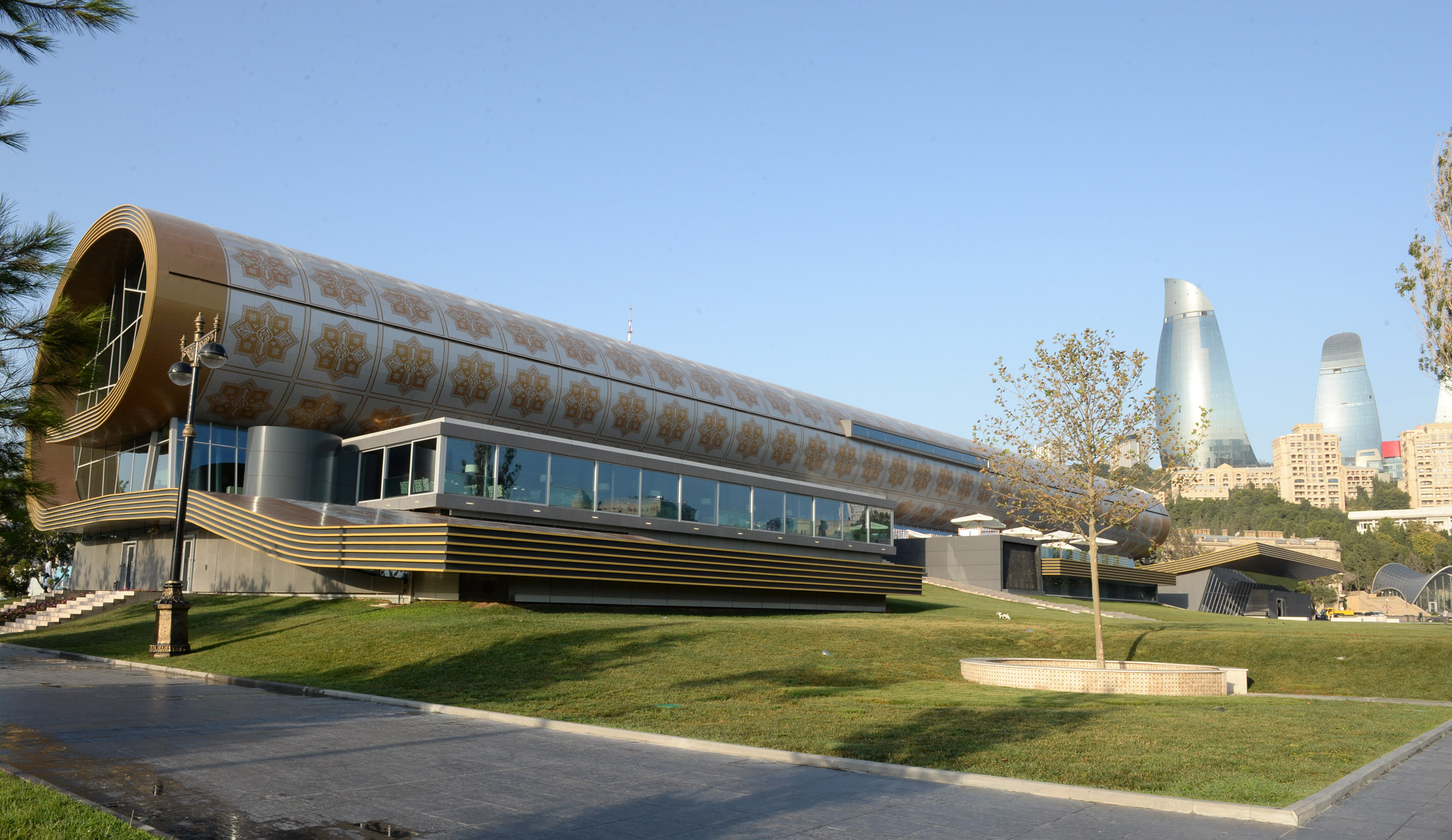
Azerbaijan Carpet Museum

In Azerbaijan, carpets decorate the home, carry a cultural significance as a family tradition transferred verbally and through hands-on practice, and are an integral part of the daily lives and customs of the Azerbaijani people. Azerbaijani folk art, particularly carpet weaving, has received government attention to preserve, study, promote and develop the carpet weaving traditions of Azerbaijani people. A law titled "On the Protection and Development of Carpet Art of Azerbaijan" was adopted in December 2004, Azerkhalcha OJSC was established in May 2016, and Carpet Weaver Day started to be celebrated on May 5 according to a presidential decree. The Azerbaijan Carpet Museum, which was designed by Austrian architect Franz Janz in the shape of a rolled carpet, was constructed between 2007 and 2014. In addition, a state program on the protection and development of carpet art in the Republic of Azerbaijan 2018–2022 was approved in February 2018 by President Ilham Aliyev with the aim of insuring the supply of raw material for this industry, improving the infrastructure for carpet-weaving, supporting the establishment of new workplaces, insure the qualified personnel training in the field of carpet-weaving, wool processing, wool and silk yarns manufacturing, and processing plants used for dyeing and production of dyes.

== See also ==
- Calligraphy in Azerbaijani culture
- Latif Karimov
- Chukhanlu carpets
