= Latif Karimov =

Azerbaijani artist

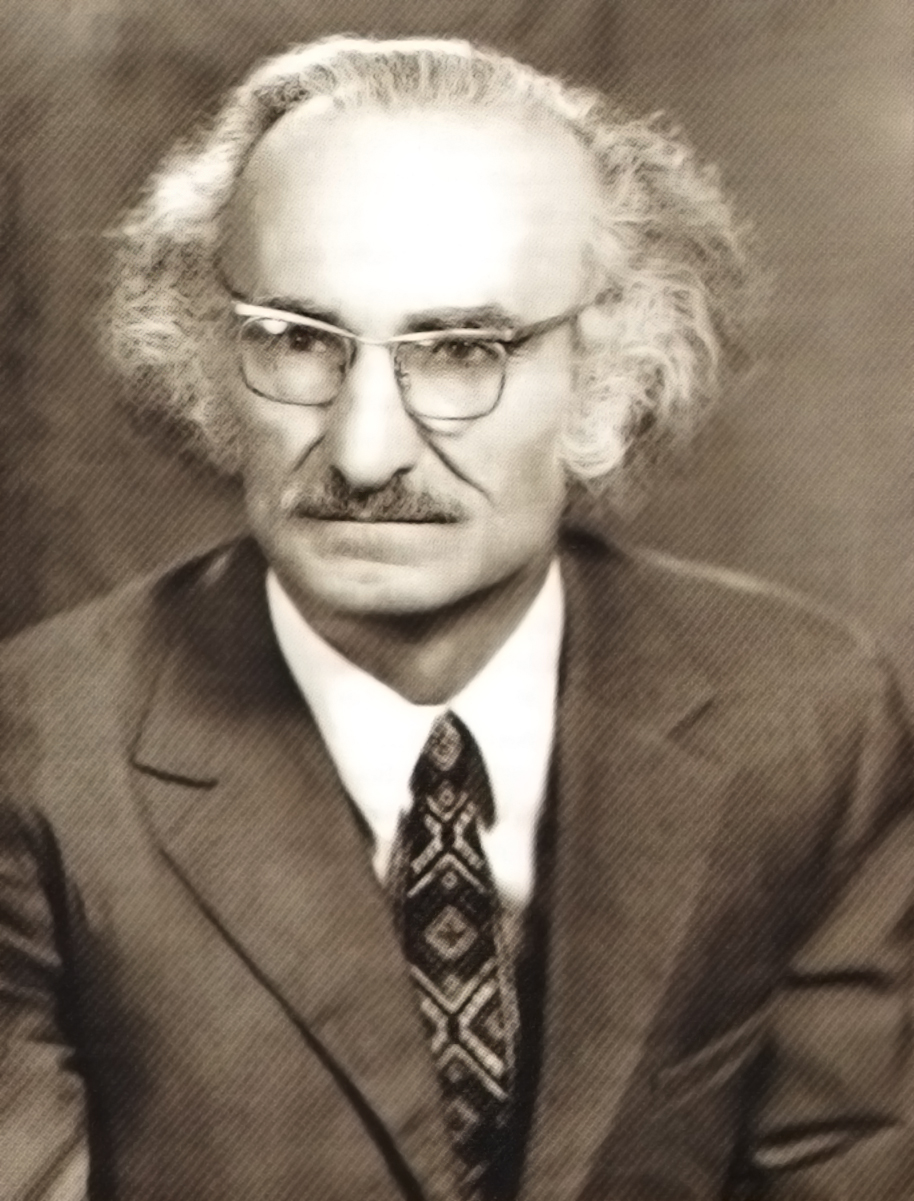
Latif Karimov

Latif Husein oglu Karimov (Azerbaijani: Lətif Hüseyn oğlu Kərimov; 17 November 1906 in Shusha – 8 September 1991 in Baku) was an Azerbaijani carpet designer known for his contributions to a variety of artistic fields, as well as for a number of books classifying and describing various designs of Azerbaijani rugs. He was awarded the honorary titles of Honored Artist of the Azerbaijan SSR (1955), and People's Artist of the Azerbaijan SSR (1960).

== Early life ==
Latif Karimov was born in Shusha (then part of Russian Empire, now in Azerbaijan). His father Mashadi Huseyn was a hatter and his mother Telli was a carpet-weaver. In 1910, the family moved to Mashhad, Iran, and settled in the Karabakhi quarter of the city. After graduating from the local madrasa at age 14, Latif Karimov started working at a carpet shop and learning the art of carpet weaving, following his mother's footsteps. He traveled extensively throughout Iran, excelling in this craft. Alongside, Karimov had a variety of interests, ranging from boxing to literature and performing arts. The Soviet Consulate in Tehran invited him to become a member of the Russian cultural club, where he later directed and acted in plays by Uzeyir Hajibeyov and established an Azeri choir.

Beginning in the late 1920s, Karimov participated in social movements demanding on behalf of weavers of Mashhad an eight-hour working day and improvement of working conditions. In 1929, he was sent on an official mission to Afghanistan to promote theatrical arts. However, Karimov returned to Iran two months later, not being able to endure the harsh living conditions of Afghanistan. In that year, he obtained Soviet citizenship, and the government of Iran, suspicious of his social involvement, offered him an option of moving to the Soviet Union, which Karimov accepted.

== Soviet period ==
Latif Karimov settled in his native Shusha and married Shovkat, a young local carpet-weaver. He was appointed import instructor to a carpet factory. In addition, he founded and conducted courses in carpet weaving, introducing Iranian techniques that were not known to the Karabakh weavers. For students who were illiterate and could not take notes, he composed goshmas (Azeri poetic genre) to get them to remember weaving procedures. He later set up similar courses in Quba and Baku.

In addition to carpets, Karimov successfully designed jewellery, wood carvings, china and fabric patterns, and decorated the interior of buildings. In 1937, he was hired to design the Azeri hall of the All-Union Agricultural Exhibition together with Rustam Mustafayev. In the 1940s, while he was decorating the interior of the Nizami Museum, the Great Patriotic War broke out, and Karimov was hired as the Azerbaijan State Radio as an Iranian news edition broadcaster.

In 1945, he was appointed head of the Department of Fine Arts at the National Academy of Sciences of Azerbaijan Institute of the Arts. Between 1947 and 1977 he compiled the Dictionary of Oriental Music. In 1950, he received the Stalin Prize, the highest-ranking award in the Soviet Union. In 1954, he organized his first personal exhibition which featured carpets, architectural ornaments, wood carvings, china vases, jewelry, graphic items, etc. Between 1961 and 1983 he published a three-volume book on the history, development and structure of over 1300 Azeri carpet pattern elements. His efforts and enthusiasm led to the establishment of the Azerbaijan Carpet Museum in 1967, the first one of this kind in the world.

The Azerbaijan Carpet Museum was named in his honour in 1991.

== Criticism ==
According to the peer-reviewed International Journal of Heritage Studies, Karimov's carpet taxonomy and classification was part of a nationalist project.
