= Rug making =

Making of rugs or carpets

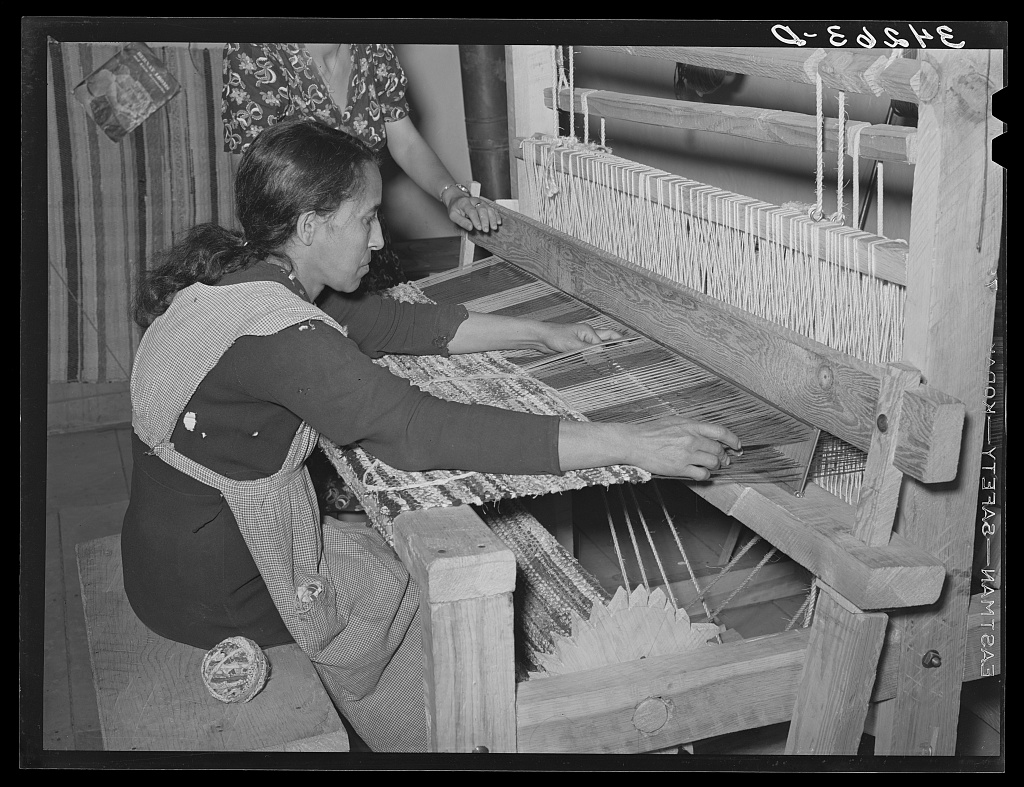
Woman passing a shuttle through the warp on a loom.

A rug is a piece of cloth, similar to a carpet, but it does not span the width of a room and is not attached to the floor. It is generally used as a floor covering, or as a decorative feature.

== Braided ==
Braided rugs are made by using three or more strips of fabric, usually wool, folding the raw edges to the middle and braiding them together. For an oval rug the centre braid should be one inch longer than the width-length in feet. example 2' x 4' rug centre strip would be 2'2" long. The centre braid is laced together and new strips are sewn on to make the braid longer as lacing continues.

== Hooking ==
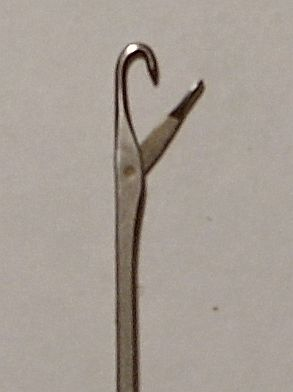
A latch hook for rugmaking.

Traditional rug hooking is a craft in which rugs are made by pulling loops of yarn or fabric through a stiff woven base such as burlap, linen, rug warp or monks cloth. The loops are pulled through the backing material by using a latch hook mounted in a handle (usually wood) for leverage.

== Rag rugs ==
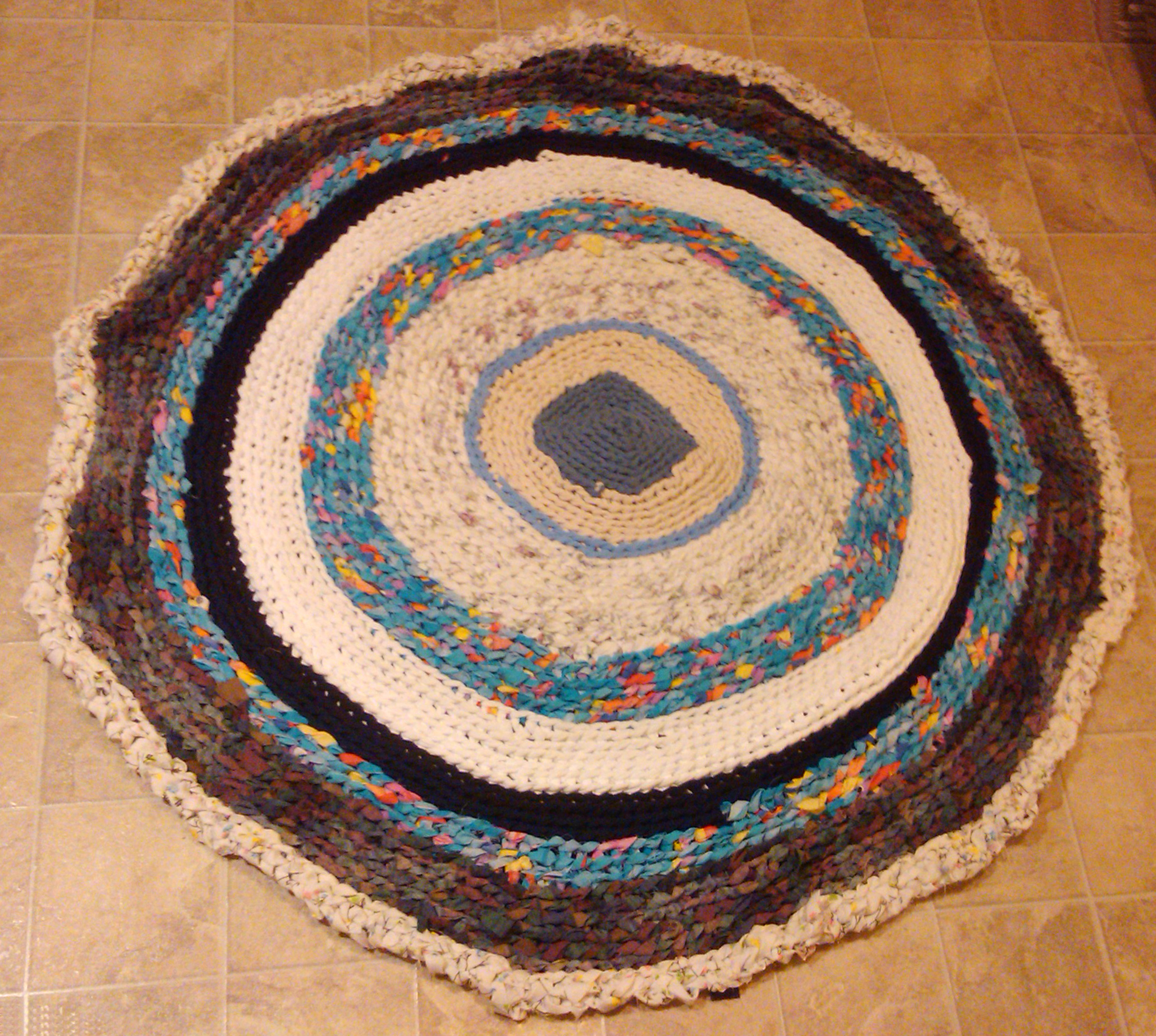
Rag rug constructed from T-shirts and bed linen

Rag rugs were commonly made in households up to the middle of the 20th century by using odd scraps of fabric on a background of old sacking. Rag rugs became widespread during the Industrial Revolution to the nineteenth century, but by the 1920s the craft was dying out except in areas of poverty or where tradition had a stronger hold. The necessity for thrift during World War II brought a brief revival, but it did not last long.

=== Prodded ===
Proddy rugs are made, as the name implies, by prodding or poking strips of fabric through hessian or linen from the back side. Rag rugs made this way have many names, such as clippies, stobbies, clippers and peggies. In Northumberland they are called proggy mats, and in Scotland they are called clootie mats. They were often made for more utilitarian use such as by the back door, their pile hiding dirt well.

The Museum of English Rural Life has a collection of rug-making tools and thrift rugs.

== Woven ==
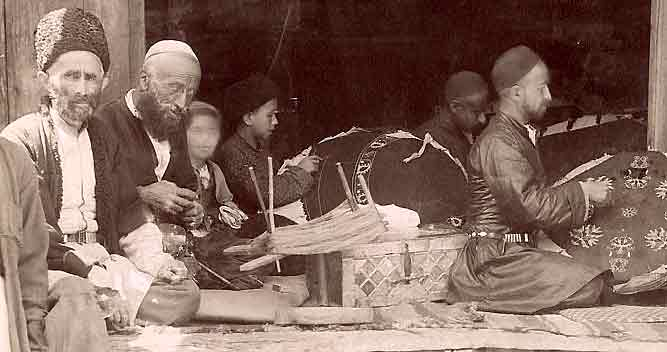
Cushion embroiders at the shop in Yelizavetpol governorate, Russian Empire (now Ganja, Azerbaijan). Late 19th century.

These are both handmade and machine-made (see carpet). Woven rugs include both flat rugs (for example kilims) and pile rugs. The more tightly a rug is woven or knotted, the more detailed a design can be.

== See also ==
- Afghan carpet
- Armenian carpet
- Azerbaijani carpet weaving
- Flooring
- Gabbeh
- Heatsetting
- Knot density
- Oriental rugs
- Tapestry
- Moroccan rugs
