= Chukhanlu carpets =

Chukhanlu carpets are a type of carpet with a rich and ancient history belonging to the Shirvan group of Azerbaijan's Guba-Shirvan carpet weaving center.

== Production ==
These carpets were primarily produced in carpet weaving centers, predominantly in the ancient district of Shamakhi, known as Gobustan. The name of the carpet is derived from the village of Çukhanlu, located 13 km southeast of Shamakhi. Formerly known as "Kabristan," "Gabristan," "Maraza," or "Chukhan," these carpets gained fame as "Chukhanlu" from the second half of the 18th century onwards.

== Artistic features ==
While "Chukhanlu" carpets share compositional similarities with "Sorsor" carpets in terms of the central field, they exhibit some differences in the shape of the motifs. One artistic feature of the "Chukhanlu" carpet is the cross-matching of colors in the vertical and horizontal directions of these motifs. The characteristic square strips of Shirvan carpets, especially the central border known as "hürük," are fully applied in Chukhanlu carpets. The influence of Azerbaijan's ancient carpet centers, Muğan and Gobustan carpets, has played a significant role in the development of "Chukhanlu" carpets.

== Technical specifications ==
The dimensions of these carpets range from 120x180 cm to 160x260 cm. Occasionally, they are also produced in the form of rectangular kilims (usually long, narrow carpets running along the wall). Loop density: from 40x40 knots per square decimeter to 50x50 knots (from 160,000 knots to 250,000 knots per square meter). The pile height is 4–6 mm.
