= Buynuz carpets =

Carpets from Karabakh, Azerbaijan

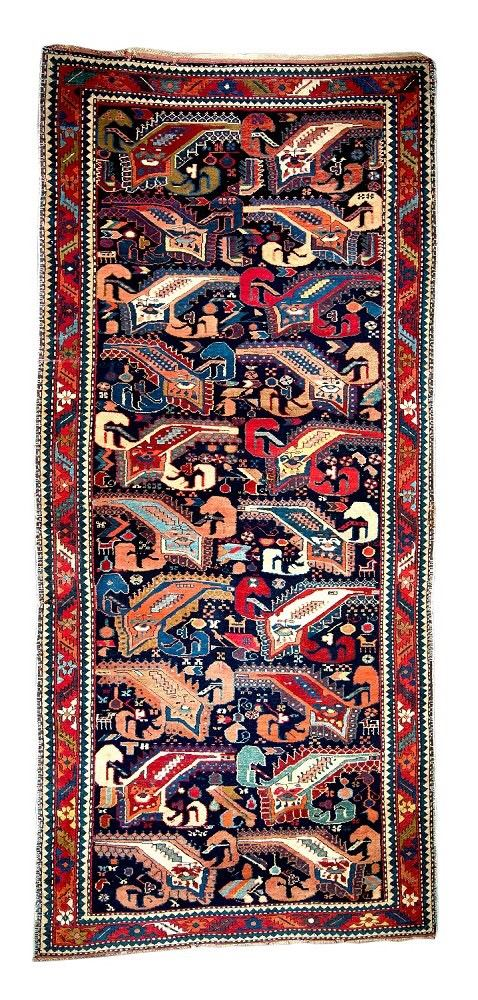
Wool Buynuz carpet, Karabakh, late 19th – early 20th century

Buynuz carpets (Horn carpets) are pile carpets from the Karabakh region, and are a type of Karabakh carpet.

== General information ==
Buynuz carpets are a type of Karabakh carpet. They were made in various carpet weaving centres of Karabakh. The main production centres were Horadiz and other carpet weaving centres of the Fuzuli region. Buynuz carpets, which were included in the carpet weaving production centres of Ganja in the 19th century, engaged the technical characteristics of local carpets and assimilated with them. Buynuz carpets developed in Ganja and bore the names Tapancha (pistol), Ganja and others. The Buynuz or "horn" carpets have horn elements in their designs. Older weavers may also call this type of carpets Horadiz.

== Artistic analysis ==
In ancient times, horned animals were considered sacred in Central Asia, Middle East, Caucasus as well as in the Azerbaijan. At first, in connection with the household, harvesting, later with totemism and astronomical concepts, horned animals had different perception and symbols. Since ancient times, horn has been considered a symbol of masculinity, bravery and courage. Images of horns are frequently found in carpet weaving works of ancient Turkic peoples, wood and felt products. In 1958, during excavations on Hasanli Hill in the south-west of Iranian Azerbaijan, a gold bowl of 9th–8th centuries BC was found. Gods, as well as the sacred ruler of Akkad Naram-Sin with horns (Naram-Suen; Naram-Sin of Akkad), who lived in the late third millennium BC, were depicted on the gold bowl.

And now, in a number of regions of the Azerbaijan, the head of a horned animal is attached to a gate or a door as a symbol of bravery and courage. In art monuments depicted in a realistic way or in a stylized form, the horns of a ram or a bull were considered a symbol of bravery and courage. However, horns with their ends placed close to each other, that is, depicted in the form of a half moon or, to be more precise, the state from the first day to the seventh day of the shape of the moon, were not considered a symbol of power and courage, but a conditional description of the Moon. Followers of the astroccult perceived it as a sacred and divine force. The image of the horn, which is typical for the decorative art of the Middle East, Caucasus, and especially the Turkic peoples, is found not only on this carpet. Various forms of this image can be admitted on other carpets and works of art. Hence, Azerbaijani people called this carpet Buynuz (horn). Creation of this carpet, in which the composition of the central field is composed of stylized horns, is associated with fantastic perception and beliefs. Horns images have lost their original meaning and now carry only ornamental and decorative meaning. Elements that are similar in shape to each other, forming the decoration of the central field of the carpet, are arranged horizontally, one after another in accordance with the artistic tradition. The asymmetric structure of these horns brings both vitality to the carpet and allows you to weave such carpets of any size. Located around these horns, the details that make up the main element of the carpet play the role of an element that fills the voids in this composition. The variety of colours of the horns does not detract from the overall harmonious shade of the carpet.

== Technical specifications ==
Buynuz carpets are woven in different sizes. In the 18th–19th centuries, Buynuz carpets were also found in the carpet set Khali Gaba. Density of knots: from 30x30 to 36x36 per square decimetre (90,000-150,000 knots per m2). Pile height: 7-9 mm. Buynuz carpets are considered one of the best Karabakh carpets.
