= Caucasian dragon carpets =

Type of carpet

Caucasian pile carpets of the ‘dragon’ type are some of the earliest preserved woven productions of the Caucasus region, dating back to the sixteenth and seventeenth centuries CE. They feature dragon motifs, more or less stylized.

In the oldest preserved examples, the warps and wefts are usually both wool, and the pile is invariably wool. As in most products of this region, the piles employ the symmetrical (or Turkish, or Ghiordes) knot.

The patterns of these designs are typically lozenge shapes with wide borders.

The origins of the motif are uncertain and disputed. It has been suggested that it was imported into the region by weavers from Kerman when Shah Abbas I set up weaving workshops in Shirvan and Karabagh. The use of the dragon motif has continued into our time, mostly associated, however, with the Kuba region, and identified as Armenian or Yerevan; these may sometimes employ cotton instead of wool in the warps or wefts.
