= Shabalyt buta carpet =

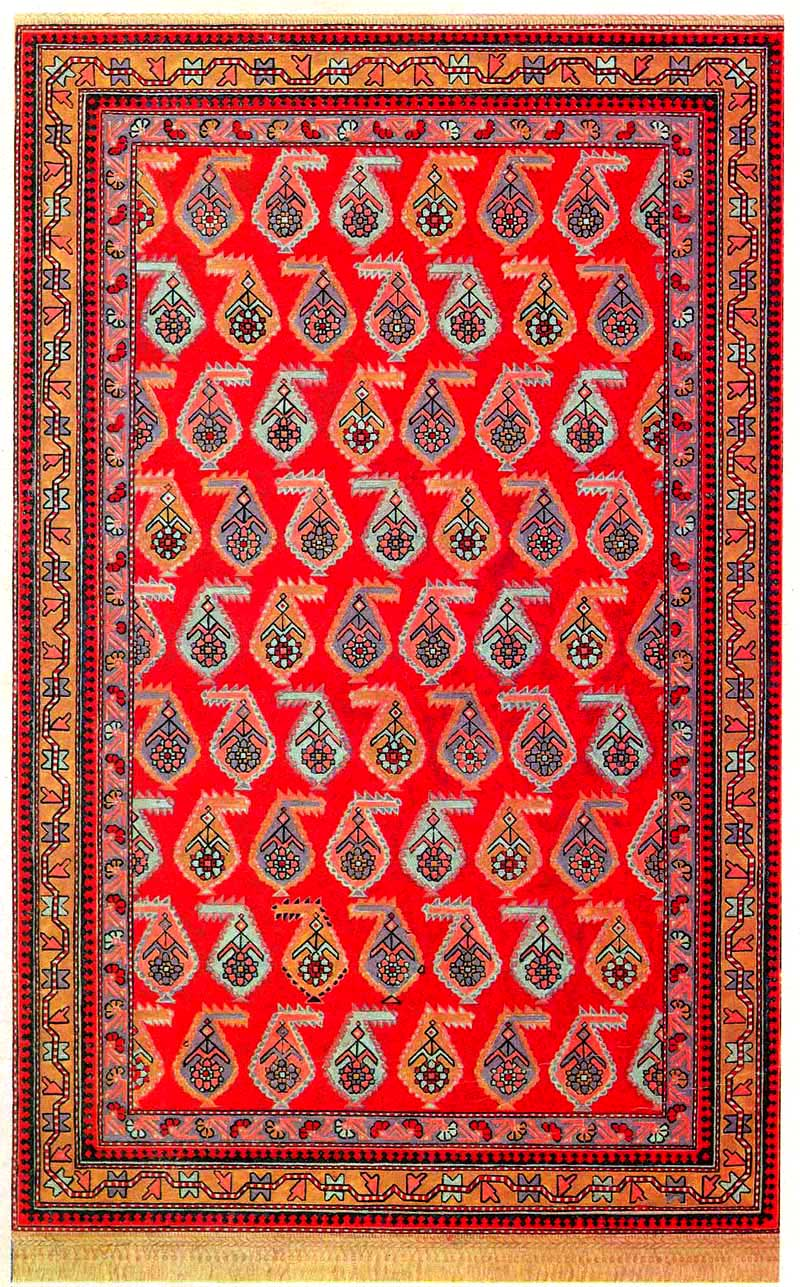
"Shabalyt buta" carpet (18th century). Azerbaijan Carpet Museum, Baku

"Shabalyt buta" (Azerbaijani: Şabalıd buta) - Azerbaijani pile carpets part of the Karabakh group of the Karabakh type. The "Shabalyt buta" carpets belong to the complex composition of the Karabakh carpets. The main centres of production of the "Shabalyt buta" carpets were Jabrayil, Aghdam and Mugan. In an earlier period, carpets of the same pattern were woven at carpet weaving points located in the Iranian Azerbaijan, but they were rougher than the Karabakh ones. The silk carpets “Shabalyt buta” woven in Jabrayil were very popular.

== Artistic particularities ==
The middle field of the carpet is covered with buta patterns facing left and right. The artistic quality of the carpet is determined by the distance between the buta elements. The carpets with the representation in their middle field with buta located more densely look better than those with the rarer composition of buta. There are also carpets “Shabalyt buta” the middle field of which is filled with “gotazly buta” (“buta with a tassel”) and “airy buta” (“curve buta”).

== Technical particularities ==
The Shabalyt buta carpets were produced in different sizes. In the recent years, the elongated carpets have been woven most often. The density of knots: each square decimetre contains approximately 40 × 40 knots (about 160 000 knots for each square meter). The pile height is 6-8 millimetres.

== See also ==
- Buta
- Azerbaijani rug
- Karabakh carpet
