= Braided rug =

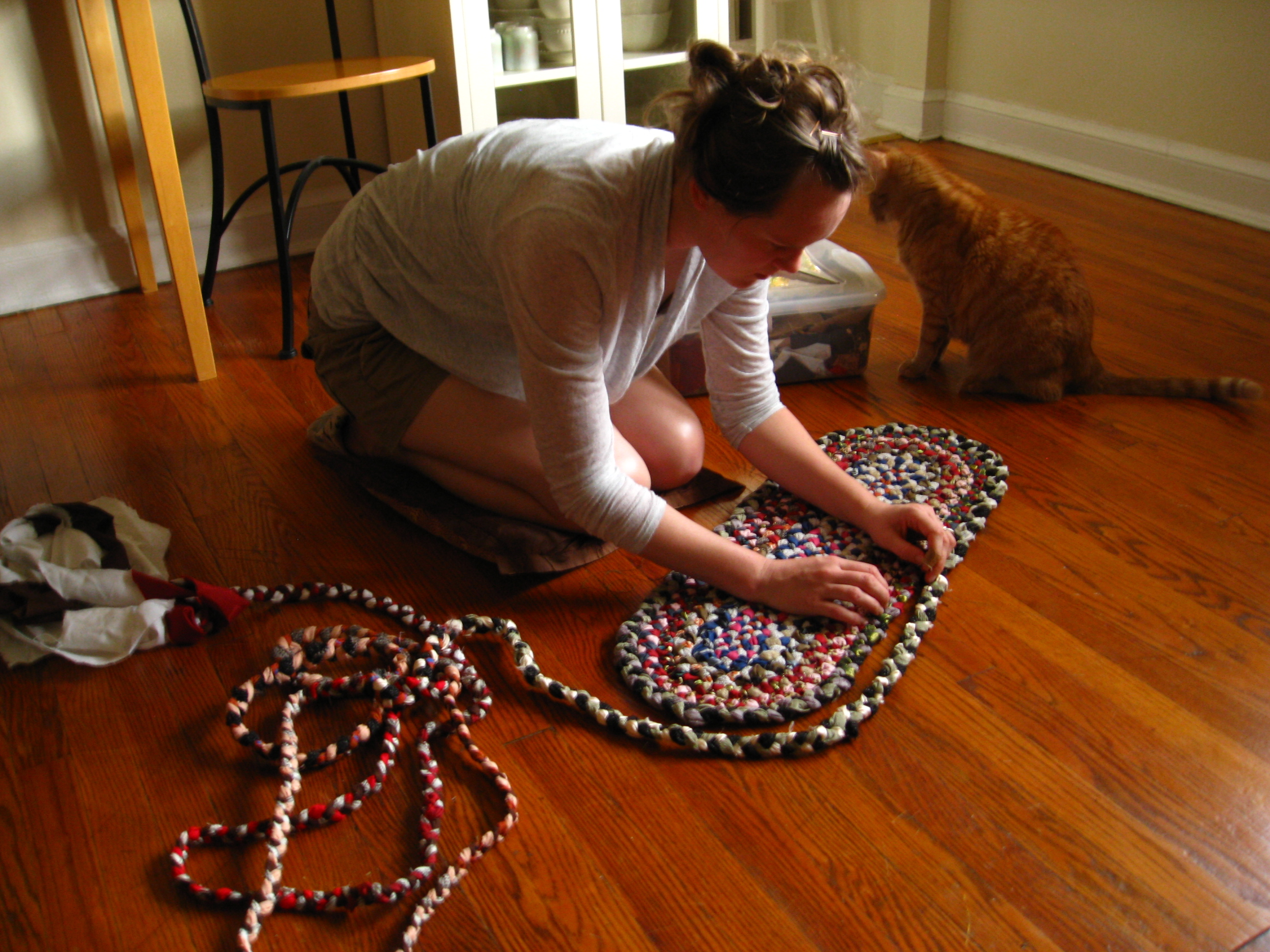
A woman making a braided rug.

The braided rug was a staple in early, Colonial American culture. Settlers used scraps of clothing and other excess materials to make a floor covering that would provide warmth and protection for a home's residents and guests.

Braided area rugs can be constructed in a variety of different ways including a banded braid construction, cloth braid construction, flat braid construction and yarn braid construction. Banded braid constructions have wide bands of either solid colored or variegated braids made from predetermined patterns to offer an appealing, thick look. A cloth braid construction is indicative of a time when outgrown clothing was cut into strips and then hand-braided into a floor covering. This particular construction is unique to one manufacturer, Thorndike Mills. A flat braid construction is a common construction as it is one of the easier and more classic methods. Three ropes of fabric or yarn are intertwined. A yarn braid construction evolves from yarn in its initial state to a uniquely finished area rug.

Braiding is an extremely old yet versatile technique that has been modernized over recent decades to display its appeal and charm.

== Modern braided rug manufacturing ==
Unlike the early American settlers very few people today have the time to make their own rugs. Commercially made braided rugs that one is likely to find in major department stores and carpet showrooms are machine-made using either the tubular or flat braid method.

== Sources ==
- Stoddard Dr., Shari. "The Making of Braided Rugs". Central Washington University. Archived from the original on 2007-08-30.
- Braided-Rugs.com. "History of Braided Rugs". Braided-Rugs.com.
- thefoxdecor.com. "Braided Rugs". thefoxdecor.com.
