= Azerbaijani carpet weaving =

Traditional carpet-weaving folk art

Traditional art of Azerbaijani carpet weaving in the Republic of Azerbaijan
- UNESCO Intangible Cultural Heritage
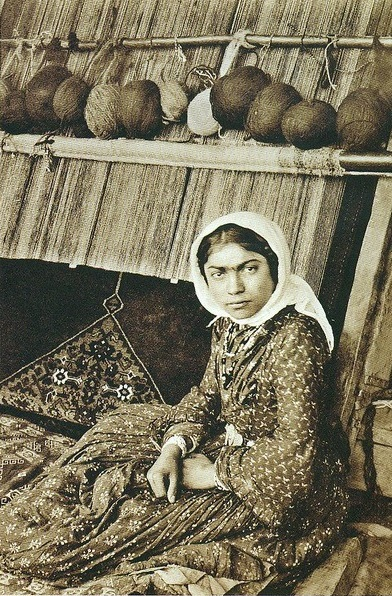
- Carpet-weaving Azerbaijani girl from Karabakh
- Country: Azerbaijan
- Reference: 00389
- Region: Europe and North America

Inscription history
- Inscription: 2010 (5th session)
- List: Representative

Azerbaijani carpet weaving (Azerbaijani: Azərbaycan xalça toxuculuğu) is a historical and traditional activity of the Azerbaijani people. The Azerbaijani carpet is a traditional handmade textile of various sizes, with dense texture and a pile or pile-less surface, whose patterns are characteristic of Azerbaijan's many carpet-making regions. Carpet making is a family tradition transferred orally and through practice.

In 2010, the art of Azerbaijani carpet weaving in Azerbaijan was added to the UNESCO List of the Intangible Cultural Heritage of Humanity.

== Carpet weaving and community ==
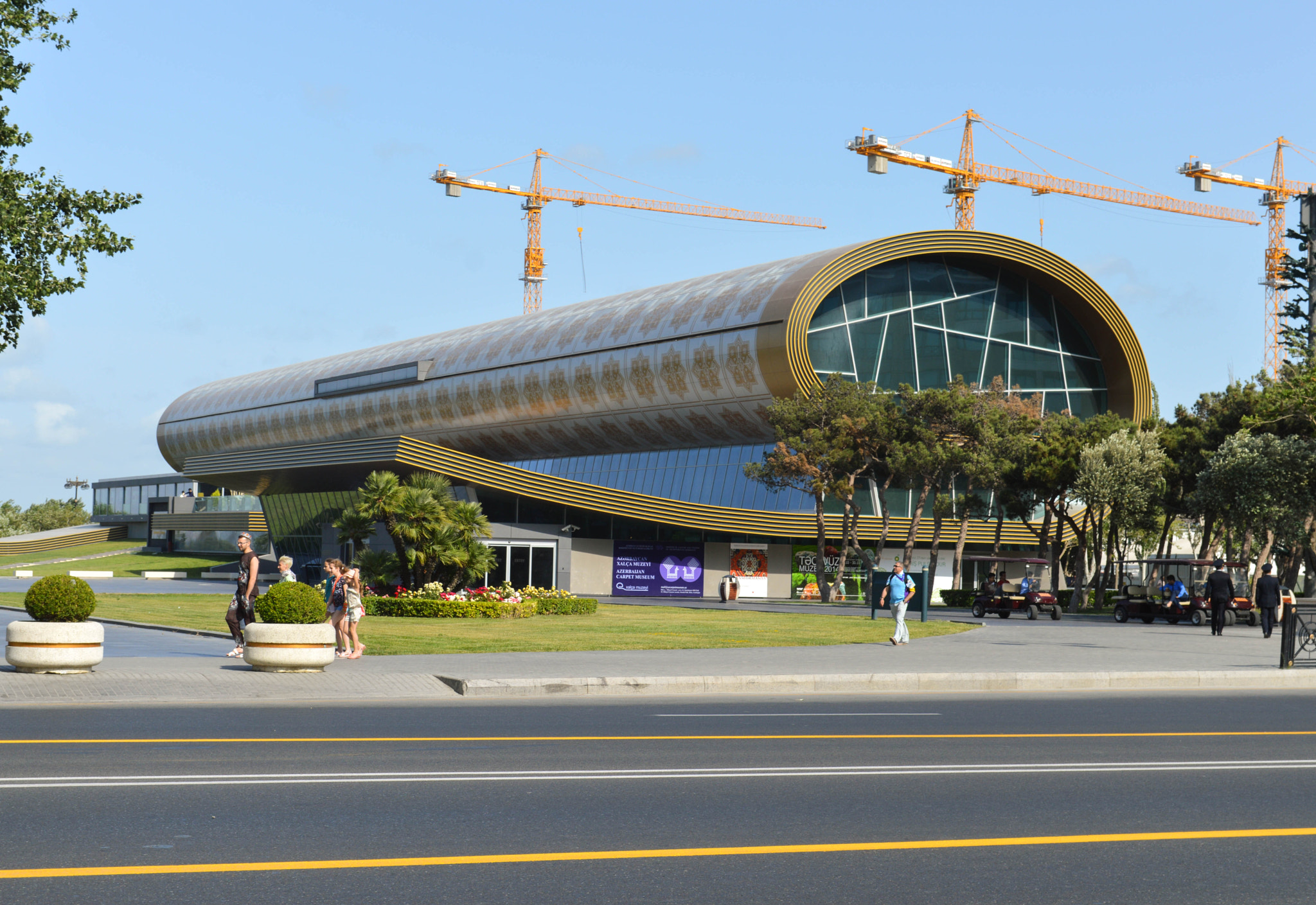
Azerbaijan Carpet Museum

In the years following Azerbaijan's independence from the Soviet Union, Azerbaijani carpet weaving tradition has been the subject to the special attention of the Azerbaijani government's efforts to preserve, study, promote and develop carpet weaving traditions. The Law “On the protection and development of carpet art of Azerbaijan” was adopted by the President Ilham Aliyev in December 2004, "Azerkhalcha" OJSC (Azerbaijani: “Azərxalça" ASC) was established in May 2016, Carpet Weaver Day started to be celebrated on May 5 according to the Presidential Decree dated 25.11.2016, the new building for Azerbaijan Carpet Museum designed by an Austrian architect Franz Janz in the shape of a rolled carpet was put into use in August 2014. In addition, State Program on the “Protection and development of carpet art in the Republic of Azerbaijan 2018-2022” was approved in February 2018 by President Ilham Aliyev with the aim to create raw material supply for this industry, improve the infrastructure for carpet-weaving, support the establishment of new workplaces and carry out qualified personnel training in the field of carpet-weaving. Furthermore, wool processing, wool and silk yarns manufacturing, and processing plants used for coloring and production of dyes were also given attention.
