= Karabakh carpet =

Carpet variety from the Karabakh region

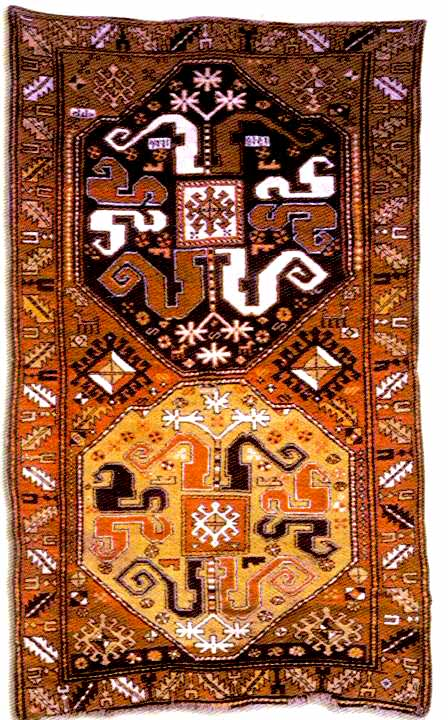
A Karabakh carpet of Malibayli sub-group, Malibayli village, 1813

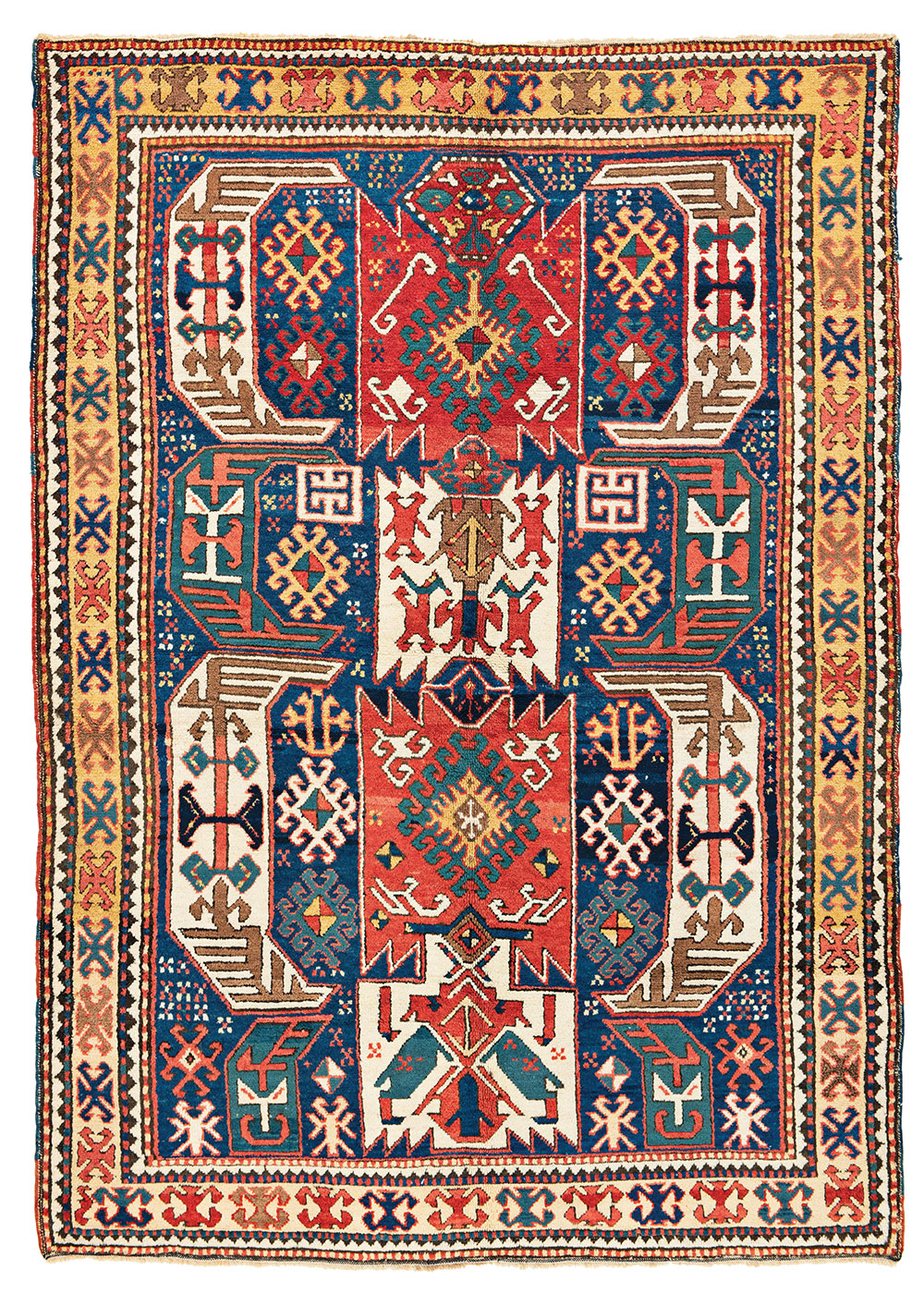
Bahmanli rug, likely woven in or near Bahmanli on the Iranian border in Karabagh, circa 1875

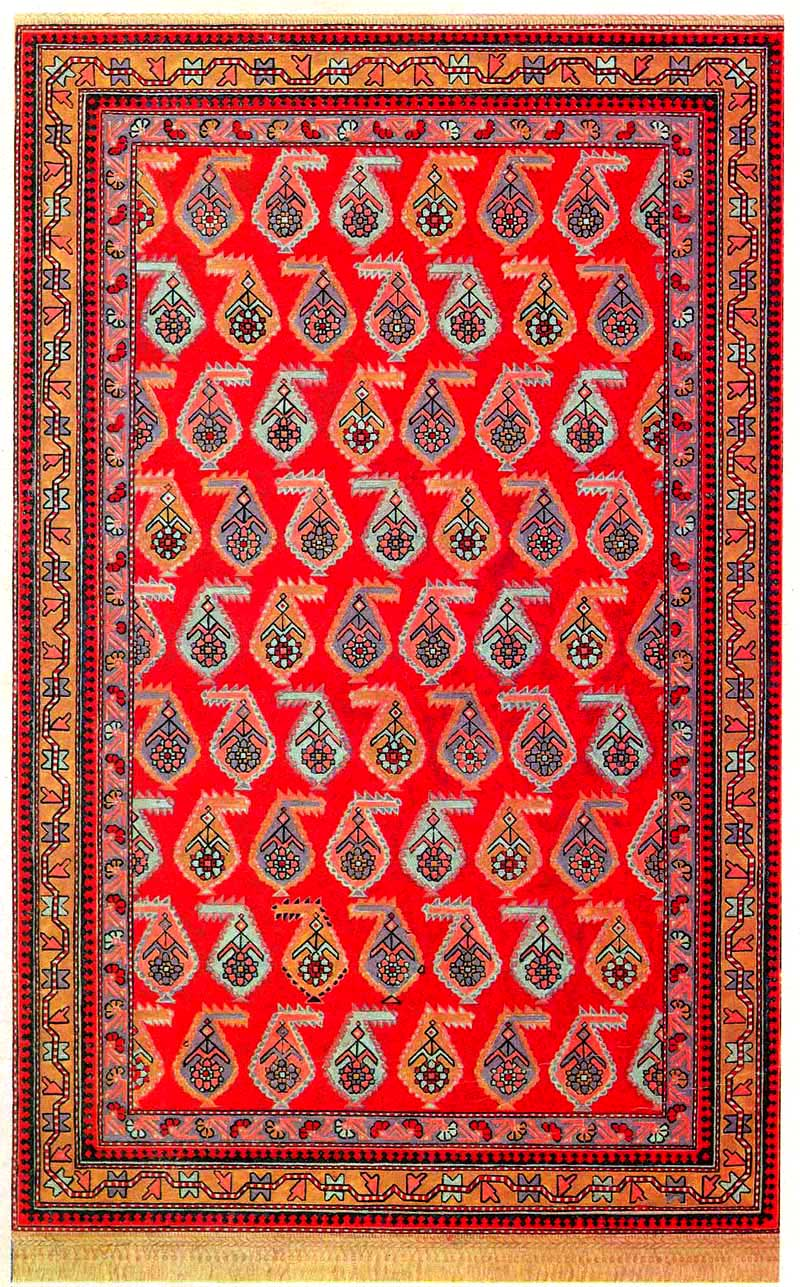
"Shabalyt buta" carpet (18th century). Azerbaijan Carpet Museum, Baku

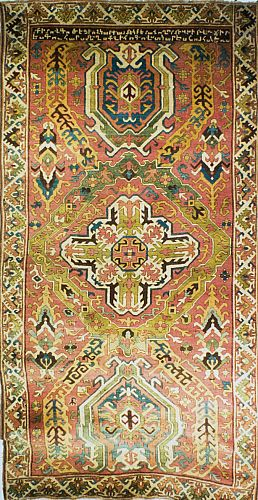
A Gohar-style carpet with Armenian inscription, 18th century

The Karabakh carpet (Armenian: Ղարաբաղի կարպետ, Azerbaijani: Qarabağ xalçası), or Artsakh carpet (Armenian: Արցախյան գորգ), is one of the varieties of carpets of Transcaucasia, made in the Karabakh region.

== History ==
Carpet-weaving was historically a traditional profession for the female population of Karabakh, though there were prominent Karabakh carpet weavers among men too. The oldest extant Armenian carpet from the region, referred to as Artsakh since antiquity and during the medieval period, is from the village of Banants (near Gandzak, Armenia) and dates to the early thirteenth century. The first time that the Armenian word for pile carpet, gorg, was mentioned was in a 1242–43 Armenian inscription on the wall of the Kaptavan Church in Artsakh, whereas the Armenian word for "carpet" was first used in the fifth-century Armenian translation of the Bible.

Carpet-weaving in Karabakh especially developed in the second half of the nineteenth century, when the population of many areas in Karabakh was engaged in carpet-weaving, mainly for commercial sale purposes. At this time Shusha became the center of Karabakh carpet-weaving.

== Types ==
=== Armenian ===
Starting to develop in Armenia and Artsakh as a part of everyday life, carpet weaving was a must in every Armenian family, with the carpet making and rug making being almost women's occupation. One of the most important conditions for the development of carpet and rug weaving was the availability of towns and cities, where the arts and crafts might develop. These cities and towns also served as large commercial centers located on main ancient trade routes that passed by the Armenian Highland, including one of the branches of the Silk Road that passed across Armenia and Artsakh. Each region in Artsakh has a different style and pattern. Artsakh carpets are unique "texts" composed of the ornaments where sacred symbols reflect the beliefs and religious notions of the ancient ancestors of the Armenians that reached us from the depth of centuries. Art historian Hravard Hakobyan notes that "Artsakh carpets occupy a special place in the history of Armenian carpet-making." The development of carpet and rug weaving in Artsakh had been the barest necessity that had been dictated by the climatic conditions of the complete Armenian Highland. The type, size and thickness of carpets and rugs had also depended upon the climate of every specific region within the territory of Armenian Highland. Common themes and patterns found on Armenian carpets include dragons and eagles. They were diverse in style, rich in color and ornamental motifs, and were even separated into categories depending on what sort of animals were depicted on them, such as artsvagorgs (eagle-carpets), vishapagorgs (dragon-carpets) and otsagorgs (serpent-carpets). The rug mentioned in the Kaptavan inscription is composed of three arches, "covered with vegetative ornaments", and bears an artistic resemblance to the illuminated manuscripts produced in Artsakh.

That the art of carpet weaving was intimately tied to the making of curtains is indicated in a passage by Kirakos Gandzaketsi, a thirteenth-century Armenian historian from Artsakh, who praised Arzu-Khatun, the wife of regional prince Vakhtang Khachenatsi, and her daughters for their dexterous weaving skills. Artsakh carpets were also renowned by foreigners who traveled to Artsakh; the Arab geographer and historian Al-Masudi noted that, among other works of art, he had never seen such carpets elsewhere in his life.

"The complex history of Armenian weaving and needlework was acted out in the Near East, a vast, ancient, and ethnically diverse region. Few are the people who, like the Armenians, can boast of a continuous and consistent record of fine textile production from the 1st millennium BC to the present. Armenians today are blessed by the diversity and richness of a textile heritage passed on by thirty centuries of diligent practice; yet they are burdened by the pressure to keep alive a tradition nearly destroyed in the Armenian genocide of 1915, and subverted by a technology that condemns handmade fabrics to museums and lets machines produce perfect, but lifeless cloth".

=== Azerbaijan ===
The Karabakh carpet school—also rendered as Qarabagh carpet—developed in two areas: in lowland and mountainous parts of Karabakh. The last one often and the most renowned one is often called "the Shusha carpet group". Besides Shusha, the surrounding villages of Dashbulag, Dovshanly, Girov, Terniviz, Malibayli, Chanakcha, Tun, Tuglar, Hadrut, Muradkhanly, Gasimushagi, Gubately, Gozag, Mirseid, Bagirbeyli, Khanlig, Tutmas were also known for their rugs. Each village developed original design and ornaments and had specific characterization which distinguished them from one village to another. In the lowlands carpet manufacturing was based in Jabrayil, Horadiz, Barda and Agdam (most notably, Lambaran village).

Carpet-weaving in Karabakh especially developed beginning from the second half of the 19th century, when the population of many areas in Karabakh was engaged in carpet-weaving, mainly for commercial sale. At this time Shusha became the center of the Karabakh carpet-weaving. Karabakh and Shusha carpets have influenced the Nakhchivan and Zangezur schools of carpets. Some experts actually consider these schools to be sub-categories of the Karabakh carpet school. Shusha's carpet-weavers, Meshedi Bayram Gurban-oglu, Djabbar Haji Akber-oglu, Fatima Aga Sherif-gizi, Ahmed Dashdamir-oglu participated and were awarded prizes in an international show in Paris in 1867. Shusha carpets also received awards in 1872 in Moscow Polytechnic Exhibition.

Azerbaijan for roughly three decades, has been particularly eager to exploit their connections to the United Nations Educational, Scientific and Cultural Organization (UNESCO), with a generous donation of $5 million, to present Azerbaijan as a major hub of the art form. Azerbaijan successfully lobbied to inscribe the traditional art of Azerbaijani carpet weaving on the representative list of UNESCO’s Intangible Cultural Heritage of Humanity. Thus since 2010 the Azerbaijani-style carpet making is part of UNESCO's Masterpieces of Intangible Heritage.

== See also ==
- Buynuz carpets
- Caucasian dragon carpets
