= Isaipriya =

Sri Lankan journalist and Television Broadcaster (1982–2009)

- Isaipriya in Sri Lankan Army custody before being raped and executed.
- Born: Shoba; 1982; Neduntheevu, Sri Lanka
- Died: 2009 (aged 26–27)
- Education: Vembadi Girls' High School
- Occupation: Journalist / television anchor

Shoba, also known as Shobana Dharmaraja, (commonly known as Isaipriya or Isaippiriya; 1982–2009) was a Sri Lankan Tamil journalist and television broadcaster for the rebel Liberation Tigers of Tamil Eelam (LTTE). She died in the final days of the Sri Lankan Civil War in 2009 with video evidence that she was captured by the Sri Lankan military before being raped, tortured and murdered. A senior United Nations official deemed the footage to be authentic. Amnesty International and Human Rights Watch also verified that it was her.

A biopic about her, Porkalathil Oru Poo, was banned in India as it would harm the nation's friendly relations with Sri Lanka.

== Early life and family ==
Shoba was born in 1982 and hailed from Delft Island. She was educated at the Memorial School and Vembadi Girls' High School. Her family moved to the Vanni in 1995 after being displaced from their home by Operation Riviresa - the Sri Lankan military's operation aimed at recapturing the Jaffna Peninsula. Shoba continued her education in Vanni before joining the rebel Liberation Tigers of Tamil Eelam.

Shoba married a LTTE cadre in 2007 and had a daughter. Her infant daughter, Akal, was killed by Sri Lanka Air Force bombing on 15 March 2009. Her husband was also killed in the final months of the civil war in 2009.

== Career ==
According to the TamilNet website and Shoba's friends she suffered from rheumatic valvular heart disease and, as such, didn't provide any military service for the LTTE. Instead Shoba worked, under the stage name Isaipriya, as journalist and broadcaster for the LTTE's Oliveechchu television station in Kilinochchi. She was also an actress, singer and dancer.

== Death ==
According to the Sri Lankan military, Isaipriya, whom it describes as "Lieutenant Colonel Issei Piriya", was killed in battle by the 53 Division on 18 May 2009. However, according to TamilNet, Isaipriya had been a volunteer at the makeshift hospital in Mullivaikkal until 8 May 2009 and had ended up at the internment camps in Vavuniya District. TamilNet claims that Isaipriya and another woman were taken away from the camps by the Sri Lankan Army on 23/24 May 2009.

On 30 November 2010 Channel 4 News broadcast video footage which allegedly showed Sri Lankan soldiers summarily executing captured Tamils in the final phase of the civil war. The video showed a number of dead bodies including a naked woman with her hands behind her back. This woman was later identified as Isaipriya by several sources. An off-camera Sinhala voice is heard in the same video saying "I would like to fuck it again" in the segment showing the dead naked bodies of Isaipriya and Ushalini Gunalingam.

A witness found by Human Rights Watch claims to have seen Isaipriya on 15 May 2009 wearing the same clothes that were next to her in the Channel 4 News video. There were signs that she may have been sexually assaulted.

On 31 October 2013, Channel 4 News broadcast new video footage which showed Isaipriya alive and in the custody of the Sri Lankan military. She is shown half naked and disorientated, and the Sri Lankan soldiers initially believe her to be Dwaraka, daughter of the LTTE leader V. Prabhakaran. Photographs are also shown of Isaipriya lying in a ditch, possibly dead, with a gash across her face and clear signs of sexual assault. According to lawyers, Isaipriya's "murder" by the Sri Lankan military constitutes a war crime.

Isaipriya's family were unaware of her capture and murder until the Channel 4 News broadcast. Her mother told Channel 4 News that she had always thought that Isaipriya had been killed by shelling. Her mother and sisters sought political asylum in the UK.

== See also ==
- Sexual violence against Tamils in Sri Lanka
- Ida Carmelitta
- Murugesapillai Koneswary
- Krishanti Kumaraswamy
- Sarathambal
- Ilayathambi Tharsini
- LTTE
