= Arumathurai Thanaluxmi =

Sri Lankan murder victim

Arumaithurai Tharmaletchumi
- Born: Trincomalee, Sri Lanka
- Died: February 11, 1996

Arumathurai Thanaluxmi was a minority Sri Lankan Tamil girl aged 15 who was gang-raped and killed by the Sri Lankan Army during the Kumarapuram massacre in Trincomalee on 11 February 1996, and who became a cause célèbre of the Sri Lankan civil war because of this.

== The incident ==
Arumathurai Thanaluxmi went to bring her neighbor Moses Vijaya's son Antony Joseph from tuition in Killiveddy and while riding back she was taken to a milk collection centre and gang-raped and murdered by Sri Lankan Army soldiers. Antony Joseph who tried to stop the soldiers was also shot. She was shot dead by Corporal Kumara, one of the eight accused in the massacre.

== Government investigation ==
On July 27, 2016, an all-Sinhalese jury of the Anuradhapura High Court acquitted the six accused former soldiers.

== See also ==
- Sexual violence against Tamils in Sri Lanka
- Ilayathambi Tharsini
- Ida Carmelitta
- Sarathambal
- Krishanti Kumaraswamy
