= Premini Thanuskodi =

- Premini
- Parent(s): TRO employee and Student

Premini Thanuskodi was a minority Sri Lankan Tamil women who was working as a Chief Accountant for Tamils Rehabilitation Organisation (TRO), a legally registered charity in Sri Lanka, when she was kidnapped on 30 June 2006 and was later raped and murdered. She was 25 years old. Premini was also an undergraduate at the Eastern university at Vantharumoolai.

== Incident ==
Premini Thanuskodi, along with other TRO employees, was travelling to Kilinochchi when the group stopped at the checkpoint at Welikanda near Batticaloa. After that they saw a white van chasing them which later overtook them. Armed men in the van kidnapped them and took their vehicle to a nearby jungle. They were kept overnight and a few TRO employees were released after being interrogated, during which they were tortured by the TMVP intelligence chief Sitha on the allegation of belonging to the intelligence wing of the LTTE. The male TRO employees who failed to convince the TMVP cadres of their innocence were killed. Later Premini was gang raped and was killed, and her body was dumped in the bushes.

== Reaction ==
The TRO complained to the Sri Lankan police and blamed the Tamil paramilitary of TMVP. There were appeals from Amnesty International expressing concerns about the group's safety.

== Government reaction ==
The Sri Lankan President called for a probe, however no one has been arrested or charged.

== See also ==
- Sexual violence against Tamils in Sri Lanka
- Krishanti Kumaraswamy
- Ilayathambi Tharsini
- Sarathambal
- Murugesapillai Koneswary
