= Case of Wijikala Nanthan and Sivamani Sinnathamby Weerakon =

2001 rape and torture case in Sri Lanka

Wijikala Nanthan and Sivamani Sinnathamby Weerakon are Sri Lankan Tamil women who were allegedly raped and tortured on March 19, 2001, in Mannar, Sri Lanka.

== Background ==
Human rights groups have documented that women have been allegedly targeted by members of the Sri Lankan security forces with impunity with acts of violence including rape and sexual harassment during the Sri Lankan Civil War.

== Incident ==
Wijikala Nanthan and Sivamani Sinnathamby Weerakon were aged 24 and 22 years when they arrested by the Sri Lankan Navy in Mannar and accused of being members of the Liberation Tigers of Tamil Eelam. Wijikala who was pregnant, her husband, Sivamani Sinnathamby Weerakon and her child were arrested at 11.00 PM and allegedly tortured in custody. They were allegedly stripped naked and raped by the Sri Lankan security forces. Further, they were tortured to sign documents that claimed they were members of Liberation Tigers of Tamil Eelam. The Sri Lankan security forces threatened them not to give evidence against them in any judicial investigation.

== Investigation ==
The government indicated that a complaint was lodged on 24 June 2001 and that Maradana (Colombo) police launched an investigation within 48 hours after she was allegedly raped. Four suspects were reportedly remanded. The attorney general assigned a state counsel to advise the police in the conduct of the investigations. The judicial medical officer who examined the alleged victim could not confirm signs of penetration or signs of resistance. However, the victims claimed that they were not actually examined. Instead, the medical officer checked off the "no injury" box of the report. After pressure from non-governmental organizations and local churches the women were re-examined. Upon re-examination it was concluded that Ehamparam Wijikala was tortured and raped and Sinnathamby Sivamany was tortured and sexually assaulted. During an identification parade conducted on 6 July 2001 by the Magistrate of Maligakanda (Colombo), the complainant identified two of her alleged aggressors, including a reserve police constable. The latter was dismissed from his functions. The police investigation was concluded and case was forwarded to the attorney general, who was due to advise the police to institute non-summary proceedings at the Magistrate's Court against the suspects. However, due to deficiencies in investigation led to the collapse of the case and there has been no conviction. United Nations Special Rapporteur further expressed grave concern into the lack of serious investigation into rape cases.

== See also ==
- Sexual violence against Tamils in Sri Lanka
- Krishanti Kumaraswamy
- Ida Carmelitta
- Sarathambal
- Murugesapillai Koneswary
