= Sexual violence against Tamils in Sri Lanka =

Conflict-related sexual violence affecting Tamil ethnic group

- Location: Sri Lanka
- Date: 1958–present
- Attack type: War rape, sexual slavery, sexual torture, sexual abuse
- Victims: Tamil civilians, detainees, militants, prisoners of war
- Perpetrators: Sri Lankan Armed Forces; Indian Peace Keeping Force; Sinhalese mobs Home guards Sri Lankan Police; STF; SIS; TMVP

Sexual violence against Tamils in Sri Lanka has occurred repeatedly during the country's long ethnic conflict. The first instances of rape of Tamil women by Sinhalese mobs occurred during the 1958 anti-Tamil pogrom. This continued in the 1960s with the deployment of the Sri Lankan Army in Jaffna, who were reported to have molested and occasionally raped Tamil women.

Further rapes of Tamils were carried out by Sinhalese mobs during the 1977, 1981 and 1983 anti-Tamil pogroms.

Following the outbreak of Sri Lankan civil war, rape was used by the Sinhalese-dominated Sri Lankan armed forces, in an attempt to collectively punish the Tamil population, who were often seen as being supportive of the Liberation Tigers of Tamil Eelam (LTTE). (Note: Rasika Kobbekaduwa, a former Sri Lankan military police officer told a UK court that he was taught to 'humiliate' opponents of the government regime through 'organised sexual assaults'.) Both Tamil females and males, including children, were targeted for rape. Other groups which committed rape against Tamils included the Indian Peace Keeping Force and Sri Lankan Police.

The LTTE has been noted for its general lack of use of sexual violence, though there have been isolated instances of rape of Tamils by LTTE members. Some LTTE members accused of rape faced execution from the leadership. (Note: "According to Margaret Trawick, an anthropologist who did field work in the Batticaloa area of eastern Sri Lanka, after four cadre gang-raped a 13-year-old girl, "As punishment, their hands were bound and they were dragged behind a tractor. At the end their bodies were torn up, and they were crying for water when they died.")

Sri Lankan Tamil refugees who fled to India have also been victims of frequent rape and sex slavery by Indian security guards and intelligence police.

Many rapes went unreported during the conflict due to various factors, including retaliation from the perpetrators, (Note: On 14 April 1998, at around 3:30pm, Selvaraasa Vasantha, a married mother of one, was raped by a Sri Lankan soldier inside the Karthika restaurant on Main Street, Point Pedro. The rape was witnessed by the owner of the restaurant V. Vijayakumari who made a complaint to the Sri Lankan Police and was due to make an appearance at an inquiry to be held on 16 April. SLA soldiers threatened her to withdraw her complaint, to which she refused. On the day of the inquiry, two Sri Lankan soldiers entered her restaurant in civilian clothing and ordered tea. They then covered her head with a pot, poured petrol over her and set her alight. All attempts by neighbours to douse the flames were blocked by the soldiers. After 45 minutes she was taken to the local hospital where she died.) impunity for the crime, (Note: A major general in the Sri Lankan Army admitted to a foreign observer that he allowed his troops to rape Tamil women, provided that they leave no evidence that could lead to investigations.) and social stigma. (Note: "Amnesty International has documented several cases of rape by members of the security forces. Because many women are reluctant to give testimony about their treatment by the security forces, Amnesty International believes that these testimonies represent only a fraction of a widespread pattern of human rights violations. In those cases reported to Amnesty International, the authorities took some initial action against the alleged perpetrators. However, the organization does not know of any member of the security forces who has been brought to justice on charges of rape.")

Sexual slavery and mass rape of Tamils by Sri Lankan government forces peaked at the end of the war in 2009, and persisted in the post-war era, with human rights groups describing it as "widespread and systematic". (Note: "Sri Lankan security forces are using systematic rape and murder of Tamil women to subjugate the Tamil population... Impunity continues to reign as rape is used as a weapon of war in Sri Lanka.")

The government forces consistently deny all the charges of mass rape, with one senior Army official stating the following in 2010:

"Throughout their training, our boys are taught to hate the Tigers, they see them as disgusting animals, not fit to live. I am 200 per cent sure that they didn't rape Tamil women. Why would they fuck them if they hate them so much?"

== 1950s ==
=== 1958 anti-Tamil pogrom ===
In May 1958 following tensions arising from the Sinhala Only Act, the abrogation of the Banda-Chelva pact and continuing Tamil protests against discrimination, an island-wide pogrom was unleashed against Tamils by organized Sinhala mobs.

Sinhalese journalist Tarzie Vittachi recounts the frequent use of rape by these mobs in his book "Emergency '58", where he describes a "Sinhala Hamudawa (army)" composed of Sinhalese laborers from various state departments and farms going on the rampage, raping, looting and beating up hundreds of Tamils. One account of rape recounted by Vittachi describes a Tamil officer who became mentally unstable as a result of being unable to defend his wife and daughter from the sexual assault:

"Another Tamil officer working in the same Government department was not so fortunate. The thugs stormed into his house and assaulted his wife and grown-up daughter in the presence of his little child. His mind cracked under the shock."

== 1960s ==
Following the 1958 anti-Tamil pogrom, the Ceylon government sent the military to the north under emergency rule, which enabled them to "operate brutally with impunity". According to Professor Neil DeVotta, Tamils were subsequently "ordered about and searched in a humiliating fashion" by soldiers, as well as being beaten or stoned by soldiers in passing military vehicles. Tamil women were also occasionally raped by the army, particularly when the soldiers were drunk on toddy.

== 1970s ==
=== 1977 anti-Tamil pogrom ===
In response to Tamils voting for a party that espoused Tamil independence, state forces orchestrated another violent pogrom on Tamils in 1977. Hundreds of Tamils were killed and raped throughout the island. The following Tamil victims of rape are from the Sansoni commission report of 1980:

- A young woman who was living with her parents at Bollegala, Kelaniya, was gang raped by two Sinhalese men in her own home after her parents were threatened with violence to leave the house, on 20 August 1977.
- A woman from the Neboda Estate was dragged away and raped by two Sinhalese men on 22 August when she went to the aid of her uncle Perumal who was being stabbed during an attack on the estate lines.
- A woman from the Frotoft Estate, Ramboda was gang raped by three Sinhalese men during a mob attack near Nillala estate on 18 August. Her jewellery was also stolen.
- An 18-year-old woman who worked on Lolgama Division. On 19 August, she saw persons coming from Galabodawatte Colony. They attacked her line room, and 6 men carried her to the bushes and raped her.
- On the evening of 18 August about 35 Sinhalese went to the house of a Tamil man in Kotagoda, Matale. He was hit and made to fall down. His house was looted and his six daughters, between the ages of 12 and 27 years were taken to a jungle 500 yards away and gang raped by about 8–9 men.
- In Ibbankatuwa, some 50 estate Tamil families cultivated about 300 acres there. On the night of 17 August, their houses were all set on fire. When the Tamils eventually returned to their homes they were attacked by an armed Sinhala mob. 5 Tamil men were stabbed and clubbed to death. The witness of this attack spoke of 3 cases of rape. This included his own sister-in-law who was raped by one of the killers. Another girl was raped by 5 Sinhala men; and yet another girl was also raped.
- On Karadupona Estate a Tamil worker was murdered by a Sinhala mob. Another Tamil worker said that she was raped by the son of a Sinhalese worker. Another Tamil worker complained of being raped by a Sinhala estate watcher.
- A worker on Rosyth Estate, Kegalle stated that 4 Sinhala men dragged her to the jungle and raped her on 20 August following attacks on their lines.

In a letter addressed to President J. R. Jayewardene, the leader of the main Tamil party, A. Amirthalingam accused Sinhala hoodlums of raping around 200 women during the 1977 pogrom. His wife Mangayarkarasi Amirthalingam emotionally recounted some incidents of rape that occurred during the 1977 pogrom and said "Tamil women could not walk the streets during nights in safety."

== 1980s ==
=== 1981 anti-Tamil pogrom ===
In 1981 members of the ruling United National Party organized another pogrom against the Tamils. In the London Observer of 20 September 1981, Brian Eads reported that "25 people died, scores of women were gang raped, and thousands were made homeless, losing all their meagre belongings".

=== 1983 anti-Tamil pogrom ===
Black July 1983 was the largest pogrom orchestrated by the Sri Lankan government against the Tamils. Up to 3000 Tamils were massacred in cold blood throughout the island. Countless women were raped with impunity.

Prior to the pogrom during the week of 18 July 1983, three Tamil schoolgirls were raped by Sinhalese soldiers in Jaffna, following which one of victims committed suicide.

The following accounts of rape occurred during the pogrom:

- Indian journalist Anita Pratap reported in The Telegraph that Sinhala gangs armed with voters' lists came in empty trucks before they systematically looted Tamil homes; they had prior knowledge not only of where the Tamils lived, but also a list of their belongings as well. She narrated the experience of an Indian victim Trilok Singh who lived in a first floor apartment with her husband in Colombo. Trilok Singh heard people breaking into the apartment below where a sixty-year-old Tamil woman lived. Her furniture were stolen and she was raped.
- A young store worker in Colombo was forced to watch the gang rape of his mother by a Sinhala gang, who hit him and his mother every time he tried to close his eyes. His mother was then killed and he was told "this is what Tamil whores deserve." He subsequently joined the LTTE and became a political leader in the organization.
- The two daughters of Diraviyam Nadar, a vessel merchant, were studying in a Buddhist school near Colombo. Both girls were raped by Buddhist priests before being sent off. Diraviyam Nadar had recently donated Rs. 20,000 to the Buddhist institution. The family ended up in a refugee camp in Mandapam, Tamil Nadu.
- On 25 July 1983, around 1:30 pm a Tamil survivor witnessed the gang rape and killing of two Tamil sisters, aged 18 and 11 by a Sinhala mob. The elder sister went on her knees and begged them not to harm her 11-year-old sister, who was then hacked to death in front of the 18 year old with derisive laughter from the mob. The elder sister was then gang raped by about 20 Sinhala men before being burnt alive. The witness also reported seeing several naked Tamil rape victims in a Colombo refugee camp who had been stripped of their clothes on the streets, and were being ogled at by Sri Lankan soldiers.
- In a letter addressed to President J. R. Jayewardene, the leader of the main Tamil party, A. Amirthalingam stated having a sworn affidavit from one Velu Subramaniam, a labourer of Thatchankulam, Vavuniya District. Subramaniam stated that his wife was gang raped by two Sinhala air-force men on the night of 30 July 1983. The air-force men then demanded his daughter to be made available to them the next day.

=== Eelam war I ===
Full-scale war broke out between the Sri Lankan Army and Tamil militant groups after Black July 1983. The Sri Lankan armed forces resorted to punitive mass rape of thousands of Tamil women in the North-East during the civil war.

=== 1984 ===
- On 11 September 1984, the Sri Lankan Army massacred 17 Tamil civilians and gang raped two Tamil women travelling in a private bus to Jaffna. Survivors later found the two young women in the jungle where their assailants had taken them. They screamed and wept on seeing them. "Give us some poison. We prefer to die here than to return to our houses in this state," they declared.
- In November 1984, the Sri Lankan Army launched an offensive on the Tamils of Jaffna. Journalist David Graves of the London Daily Telegraph stated that "the only talk on the front line in Jaffna was death and fear where the Sri Lankan armed forces had unleashed a bloody campaign and where they are committing the most grotesque crimes away from international notice." He also reported that Jaffna was under siege and that the 800,000 inhabitants of the peninsula were living in the "shadow of murder, arson, bombings and lootings."
- 'A sobbing young woman, eight months pregnant, whose husband is working overseas, told me she was raped by a soldier at gunpoint the night before while other troops burned her mother's home.' stated David Graves in the same article. He spent three days listening to a "series of appalling stories of rape, massacre and intimidation."
- In November 1984, Sinhalese convicts were settled in the Kent and Dollar farms after the Tamil civilians living there were evicted by the Sri Lankan Army. The settlement of prisoners was used to further harass Tamils into leaving the area. The Sinhala settlers confirmed that young Tamil women were abducted, brought there and gang-raped, first by the forces, next by prison guards and finally by prisoners.
- In December 1984, a day after the LTTE attack at Kokkilai, a Sinhalese mob led by Sri Lankan Army soldiers invaded the Tamil village of Thennaimaravadi, yelling for revenge. The village was burnt to the ground and a few Tamils were shot dead by the army. Tamil women were also raped.

=== 1985 ===
- In February 1985, the Sri Lankan army massacred, tortured and raped several Tamil civilians in Mannar district. Survivors who fled to India recounted how they witnessed their women being raped, and their relatives being tortured and killed. A mother and daughter, Parvathy (45) and Lakshmi (16) worked as maids for a rich Tamil family in Pesalai. One day while they were working in the kitchen, Sinhala army men burst into the house, pushed away the children and trampled on them with their heavy army boots. They then proceeded to gang rape the women. The maids managed to escape unnoticed by jumping out of the kitchen window.
- In the same article, Dharmakulasingham, a journalist from Mannar confirmed that the army were raping Tamil women and torturing children. He stated that Tamil youth were "herded into large gunny bags and sewn up" before being burned alive. He also said that women were "beaten up mercilessly and gang-raped" by the army to satisfy their lust before being "shot like dogs".
- In the second week of April 1985, pushing a policy of divide and conquer, President J. R. Jayewardene sent M. H. Mohamed, along with his henchmen to attack Tamils in the village of Karaitivu (Ampara). Muslim youth with the support of the security forces killed several Tamils and burned over 2000 Tamil homes, rendering 15,000 Tamils homeless. A.R.M Imtiyaz interviewed Muslim youths from the surrounding villages who confirmed that Muslim young men sexually abused and raped several poor young Tamil women.
- On 13 May 1985, the Sri Lankan Army brutally raped a 6-month-pregnant mother (25) in the village of Nayanmarkaddu, Jaffna.
- An attack on the Tamil village of Kiliveddy, Trincomalee District commenced on 31 May 1985 at 8:30 pm. A police party and Home Guards from the Sinhala village Serunuwara were responsible for the attack. A total of 175 houses were burnt during the attack and scores killed. Two young Tamil women were raped after being taken to the adjacent Sinhala colony of Dehiwatte.
- On 17 July 1985, Sri Lankan soldiers abducted a 14 year old Tamil girl from a refugee camp in Kathiraveli and took her to an isolated tile factory owned by a Sinhalese. They then brutally gang raped her.
- On 6 October 1985, in Mankerni, Batticaloa, two pregnant Tamil women were taken away by the army in a midnight house-to-house search and then raped.
- On 9 November 1985, Sri Lankan security forces entered the home of Mr. Mylvaganam in Kantalai, Trincomalee during the night and took away six Tamil civilians, including his two daughters. Their dead bodies were later found and medical examination revealed that the two daughters, Rajeswary (24) and Shanthini (22), had been raped before being killed.
- On 5 December 1985, four women from Tamil households in Munnampodivettai, Trincomalee were gang raped in their own homes by the Sri Lankan Army. Ten men were also shot dead. The 4 women each gave sworn affidavits to the Ceasefire Monitoring Committee confirming their ordeal. One woman was a Sinhala woman named Upasena Premawathie who was married to a Tamil man. Three Sri Lanka Army soldiers broke into her house, pushed her onto the floor and gang-raped her in succession despite her begging for mercy. In her presence she also saw her Tamil sister-in-law being similarly raped. Another victim, 20-year-old Mrs. K.M., was at home with her husband and 11-year-old daughter. The army came to her house, took her husband away, and then five of them gang raped her; she regained consciousness at 7 am. Her husband was later shot dead by the army. Another Tamil woman, 32-year-old Mrs. T.A., stated that three army men came to her house, removed her husband and then gang-raped her in succession.
- During a search operation by the Sri Lankan security forces between 10 and 11 December 1985 in Mutur, Trincomalee, 6 Tamil women were raped.
- On 19 December 1985, two married Tamil women in a distraught state complained to the Trincomalee Citizens Committee that they had been raped by Home Guards in Periyakulam, Trincomalee.
- On 25 December 1985, 5 Muslim home-guards posing as soldiers, raped and shot dead two Tamil women, Mary Agnes Yogeswary (21) and Felicia (18) in Muttur, Trincomalee District. This was revealed during a magisterial inquiry.
- In 1985 Tamil journalist Taraki Sivaram met a pretty Tamil woman called Rani from the poverty stricken village of Pulankulam, Trincomalee District. The village consisted of mud and straw huts, and the area had been given a new Sinhala name. Rani told him she had been raped and displaced by the Sri Lankan Army. When Sivaram went to visit the village later on, he found it to be burned to the ground.

=== 1986 ===
- On 19 February 1986, Sri Lankan armed forces assisted by Muslim home-guards attacked the village of Udumbankulam in the Akkaraipattu division killing at least 80 Tamil farm workers. Five Tamil woman complained of being raped in the paddy fields during the assault.
- In March 1986, Tamil female refugees in London reported that Tamil women in Sri Lanka were being frequently raped in army camps after being taken in for questioning by the Sri Lankan Army. A married pregnant lady with polio who suffered with a limp was said to have been one of the rape victims. She was left in such a bad state that she required admission to Jaffna Teaching Hospital. The screams of Tamil women as they were being raped in Gurunagar army camp were also heard frequently by local residents.
- On 10 April 1986, army men raped a 29 year old Tamil mother of two at Chenai village, Muttur. She was admitted to Trincomalee hospital and the Trincomalee Citizens' Committee planned to take up the matter with the army authorities.
- In 1986, two Tamil children Regini David (13) and her younger sister (6) were sexually assaulted by the Sri Lankan Army in Jaffna as Tamil paramilitary groups watched in tears. Regini later recounted:

"Our Tamil armed group brothers of freedom fighters who helped the army watched us being sexually assaulted; but some I saw had tears in their eyes as their hands are tied. The army did not even leave me as a 13 years old or my sister who is 6 years old. My sisters' bodies got frozen and never talk about any thing. Our mothers told us not to say any thing to our neighbors or the world as she did not trust the world and worried that our future will be destroyed as we were told. One day a sister from our neighborhood committed suicide. We asked what happened, the parents kept quiet. Later my mother told me that she was raped and killed herself as she does not want to see this terrifying world."

- On 15 July 1986, 48 Tamil refugees in the Peruveli village in Trincomalee were massacred by the Sri Lankan Army and Sinhalese Home Guards. Pro-rebel NESOHR reported that many Tamil women were also raped during the massacre.
- On 18 July 1986, 67 Tamil refugees in the Manalchenai village in Trincomalee were massacred by the Sri Lankan Army and about 7 women were raped.
- In October 1986, the Sri Lankan Army entered the interior village of Pullumalai, Batticaloa District. During a round-up, more than 50 Tamils were taken prisoner, another 18 were executed, and some Tamil girls were raped. The entire village fled and were made refugees during the assault. In the course of a subsequent inquiry on the attack, relatives revealed that 3 married women were raped by the army, with 2 of them later being gunned down by the soldiers.

=== 1987 ===
- Following the Operation Liberation on 31 May 1987, Sri Lankan Army detained around 5,000 Tamil youths between the ages of 15 and 35 from the Vadamarachchi region of Jaffna. The youths were transported to the Boosa internment camp in Galle where they were subjected to torture and sexual abuse.

==== IPKF period ====
From October 1987, the IPKF commenced war on the LTTE in order to disarm them. During this conflict, the IPKF raped thousands of Tamil women. One IPKF official excused these rapes by stating the following:

"I agree that rape is a heinous crime. But my dear, all wars have them. There are psychological reasons for them such as battle fatigue."

- During Operation Pawan, Gurkha soldiers detained a group of Tamil teenagers at a bus station around Jaffna town. Three girls were stripped naked and gang raped and three boys who tried to intervene were shot dead. The dead bodies were piled on top of six naked corpses and burned.
- A schizophrenic young Tamil girl who had been admitted to the Intensive Care Unit at the Jaffna Teaching Hospital following a landmine injury was taken to the nurses' changing room and gang raped on four successive nights by IPKF soldiers. She was later taken to the Kankesanthurai camp and raped again. After being readmitted to the Jaffna Hospital, she was taken to the toilet and repeatedly raped.
- A Tamil girl was detained by the IPKF on suspicion of militant link was threatened with rape and assault by the captain. After she was released, the IPKF soldiers who had followed her home separated her parents and raped the girl who started bleeding.
- On 6 November 1987, at about 7:30 am the IPKF committed a massacre of Tamil civilians in Jaffna to avenge the loss of their comrades. One witness saw both his two daughters being stripped naked below the waist by Hindi-speaking soldiers. The girls were both crying and begging for mercy. The soldiers then separated their legs and shot them through their genitals, keeping the rifle barrel between the thighs. The witness closed his eyes and played dead during the shooting. He also heard the two daughters of another man also being shot through the genitals. 10 Tamil civilians were killed in total during this massacre, including infants.
- On 12 November 1987, at about 8 am in Jaffna, three IPKF soldiers gang raped a Tamil mother in her mid 30s in her own home. Her husband was working abroad at the time. They also stole her gold jewelry. The victim reported suffering from nightmares following the attack and was haunted by the soldiers' faces and voices. She could still remember their beady eyes. She visited a psychiatrist who gave her drugs to quieten her down.
- The IPKF also raped a 13 year old Tamil girl from a middle-class family in a house that had once been an LTTE camp. The family and child fled to Colombo after the rape.
- On 16 November 1987, two IPKF soldiers raped a young Tamil girl in her home, after separating her from her parents. She bled after the rape and then jumped into the family well in desperation.
- On 18 November 1987, between 2 and 3 pm, two IPKF soldiers raped a widow (55) and a 22-year-old woman in a poor Catholic area of Jaffna. The younger girl was able to free herself after being raped, and ran down the road screaming. She cried out "they have spoilt me".
- On 17 December 1987, Sepoy Karnail Singh of 14 Sikh light infantry of the IPKF faced dismissal and one year's imprisonment for raping a Tamil woman from the village of Idaikkurichy. Similar punishment was given to A. Mani, the barber of 93 Field Regiment for raping an unmarried woman near Kodikamam on 24 December 1987.
- On 19 December 1987, at 11:30 am, two Tamil women were raped in Jaffna by the IPKF. The younger woman was aged 25. The two women were taken into two separate rooms and raped. The IPKF soldiers left once the neighbors arrived in masses to the house, alerted by the dogs barking fiercely.
- On 23 December 1987, an educated 18 year old Tamil virgin from a poor laborer family was gang raped by two IPKF soldiers in succession. The previous day the soldiers had come and stolen chickens from their garden.
- Nail Banwari Lal and rifleman Gugan Ram of 18 Garhwal Rifles faced dismissal and 6 months' imprisonment each for trying to rape married women at Kaithadi on 25 December 1987.
- In 1987, when Tamil journalist Mr A.Lokeesan was 6 years old, he heard a Tamil woman screaming in a paddy field as she was being raped by IPKF soldiers.
- Karunaharen, a 16-year old Tamil boy was stopped along with his sister by IPKF soldiers. His sister was then taken into a house by the soldiers, where he heard her scream. He ran to the window and witnessed her being raped and then killed by the IPKF soldiers. He ran back to his home in terror. His parents later bought him a ticket to Canada, fearing for this safety. On his way to Canada, he was stopped at Seattle, taken off the plane and put in a detention centre with a criminal gang from Seattle. The gang members then beat and gang raped him. A sympathetic prison guard then handed him over to a Tamil lawyer living in Seattle.

=== 1988 ===
- On 25 January 1988, the body of a 30 year old Tamil woman was found in a well. She had committed suicide after being raped by IPKF soldiers who had visited her house. The postmortem found clear evidence of rape, with lacerations to her vagina and bruises on the labia.
- On 29 January 1988, at 12:10 pm, a 22 year old Tamil student was raped by 4 IPKF soldiers behind the bushes, after they separated her from her semi-blind father near a temple in Jaffna.
- Havildar Badan Singh of the IPKF committed sodomy against 4 LTTE male activists during their detention at Jaffna fort in January–February 1988.
- On 1 February 1988, an IPKF soldier of 12 Grenadiers – Khem Raj Meena – faced imprisonment and dismissal from service for attempting to rape another married Tamil woman at Thunnalai south, Point Pedro.
- On 27 May 1988, two IPKF soldiers, Latur Lal and Babu Lal of 12 Grenadiers, faced dismissal and a year's imprisonment for raping a married Tamil woman at Karaveddy during Operation Pawan.
- On 15 November 1988, 6 members of the IPKF raped 7 Tamil women in Jaffna. The victims of rape were Mrs. Sushila Veerasingam, Miss Manjulu Nadarajah, Miss Mala Asaipillai, Miss Rani Subramaniam, Miss Rajani Subramaniam, Miss Thayalini Sundaram and Miss Syamala Rajaratnam.
- Amnesty International reported an increasing number of allegations that IPKF personnel had raped Tamil women. Several dozen Tamil women have testified on oath that they were raped by the IPKF, including in Kondavil East in the north and in Sathurkodanan and Morakkadanchenai villages in the east.

== 1990s ==
=== 1990 ===
- On 20 June 1990, three Tamil women among the 3,000 Tamils who were detained by the Sri Lankan Army in the Kalmunai Kachcheri in Amparai were raped.
- In late June 1990, a female teacher from the Kalmunai refugee camp who had gone to ask for food from the Grama Sevaka was raped by the Army.
- According to the pro-rebel NESOHR, on 11 August 1990, 25 young Tamil men from the Kalmunai village in Amparai were taken by the Sri Lankan Army to the Karaitivu army camp. On the following day, relatives of the youths who went looking for them were stopped and made to stand by the roadside in the Kalmunai town. After a larger group of Army personnel arrived, young women among the relatives were selected and taken to a building nearby where they were gang raped and killed.
- On 9 September 1990, the Sri Lankan Army massacred at least 184 Tamil civilians at Sathurukondan. The only survivor K.Krishnakumar told the pro-rebel TamilNet, that during the massacre Sinhala soldiers stripped two pregnant Tamil women naked before slicing their breasts off. The soldiers then cut the pregnant women's abdomens open with swords, before pushing them into a pit. The eyewitness also describes many naked Tamil girls being brought to the massacre site, who were then all raped repeatedly. The soldiers then cut their breasts off with swords and pushed three of the girls into a well. All the bodies were subsequently burned in a pit.

=== 1991 ===
- In mid 1991, the Sri Lankan Army raped a Tamil trainee teacher (26) and her younger sister.
- On 12 June 1991, following a landmine explosion in Kokkaddicholai, the Sri Lankan Army massacred at least 123 Tamil civilians in Kokkaddicholai, including women and children. Six Tamil women were also raped during the massacre, including 2 sisters. Another witness described seeing a young girl being sexually assaulted by Sinhala soldiers. Another account of this event describes an incident where a young Tamil girl took shelter with an old lady teacher, who offered the soldiers all the jewelry the girl had in order to spare her. The soldiers took the jewelry and raped the girl as well.

=== 1992 ===
- On 14 November 1992, drunk Sri Lankan soldiers took away 4–5 Tamil women from the village of Aithuyamalai, Batticaloa District. They were taken to the local army camp under the guise of questioning, but were all subsequently raped.
- In December 1992, the Sri Lankan Army raped several young Tamil women in Pullumalai, Batticaloa District during a round up. 13 Sri Lankan soldiers responsible for these rapes were subsequently transferred from the area by the Brigadier in charge, although it is not known whether they faced any disciplinary action.

=== 1993 ===
- In August 1993, the Sri Lankan Army raped a Tamil woman called Lakshmi Pillai in the Plaintain Point army camp, Trincomalee.

=== 1994 ===
- Amnesty International received several reports of rape of Tamil women by the Sri Lankan army in the east in late 1994.

=== 1995 ===
- In January 1995, the Sri Lankan Army raped three Tamil women at Poomachcholai and Kayankaddu, Batticaloa district, in retaliation for a LTTE attack on the army camp of Thandavaveli.
- Amnesty International reported a dramatic increase in rapes and incidents of torture committed by Sri Lankan soldiers against Tamils following the resumption of war in April 1995.
- In August 1995, two Army informants raped a Tamil woman called Lakshmi Pillai in her Trincomalee home in front of her two sons. The motive was thought to be revenge for her speaking out about her previous rape by the army in the Plaintain Point army camp in August 1993.
- On 11 May 1995, in Karunkaladichenai village, Kiran, Batticaloa District, the Sri Lankan Army raped two Tamil girls, Samithamby Pathmini (18) and Vyramuthu Vijaya (17) after separating them from their male relatives at 9:30 pm. In mid-1995, further rapes against Tamil women carried out by the Sri Lankan Army were also reported in Chettiarkudiyiruppu (4 cases), Korakallimadu (1 case), Pethalai (2 cases), and Matpandatholitchalai (9 cases).

=== 1996 ===
- On 11 February 1996, during the Kumarapuram massacre in Trincomalee District, where 24 civilians were massacred, including 7 children below the age of 12, a Tamil girl called Arumathurai Thanaluxmi (15) was gang-raped by Sri Lankan soldiers before being shot dead. She was dragged from a village boutique to a Milk collection centre where the rape occurred. A boy called Anthony Joseph (14) attempted to stop the soldiers from dragging her away, but was shot between the legs.
- On 7 March 1996, Sri Lankan soldiers raped a Tamil woman and beat her husband with rifle butts at Thiyavedduwan checkpoint. The couple were later both admitted to Valaichchenai hospital.
- On 29 April 1996, near the Navatkuli-Kachchai road in Thenmarachchi, Sri Lankan soldiers entered a small hut in a peasant settlement, and raped the wife of a Tamil man. The Tamil man himself was stabbed to death by the soldiers during the assault.
- In April–May 1996, during the Sri Lankan Army's 'Operation Riviresa II' and 'III' military offensives, a few extrajudicial executions and rapes of Tamils were committed by Sri Lankan soldiers. One case involved a young married Tamil couple who lived on Kachchai road, Chavakachcheri. The couple were taken into custody by the army, who then stabbed the man to death, and raped the wife, before stabbing her too. The local villagers were too frightened to identify the perpetrators due to the fear of reprisals from the security forces.
- On 1 May 1996, in Kachchai, Thenmarachchi, a young Tamil couple, S.Karunathiran (25) and his wife Pushpamalar (22) were found brutally murdered in their family's field. His wife was suspected to have been raped before being killed. The Sri Lankan army had a large presence of troops in the area at the time.
- On 11 May 1996, a displaced Tamil woman was raped and killed by Sri Lankan soldiers in Kodikamam, Jaffna District.
- On 17 May 1996 at 6:30 pm, in Manduvil, Thenmarachchi, three Tamil males and a child (3) were chopped to death by the Sri Lankan Army. Three Tamil women were also raped during the attack, Sri Ranjani (18), Puvaneswari (36) and Rajeswari (38) Sarasaalai. One of the rape victims, Thangaraja Puvaneswary (36) testified that the army were responsible. Despite this the incident was ignored and covered up.
- On 19 May 1996, a Tamil woman was raped by Sri Lankan soldiers in Colombothurai, Jaffna District.
- In early July 1996, in Mattuvil, Thenmarachchi, three Sri Lankan Army soldiers went to a house and dragged out a young Tamil girl. She was heard crying as she was dragged out from the house. Her brother and next door neighbor tried to prevent the abduction but were both brutally beaten by the army. She was then raped by the army before being returned home. The family were then threatened with death by the army if they dared to report the incident. All three victims were later admitted to Jaffna Hospital.
- On 4 August 1996 at 11 pm, in Kerudavil, Jaffna, the Sri Lankan Army murdered a Tamil man called Karthigesan (67) and his daughter Baleswari (22), who they also raped before killing. The mangled bodies of the two victims were identified by the public at Chavakacheri Base Hospital.
- On 7 August 1996, Krishanti Kumaraswamy (18) went missing on her way home after sitting her GCE Advanced Level exam, at Chundikuli Girls High School. She was last seen alive at 11:30 am at Kaithady Army checkpoint in Jaffna. Later investigations revealed that she was abducted by five soldiers. Another six soldiers gang raped and killed her at the checkpoint. Her mother Rasammah, brother Pranavan (16), and family friend Kirupakaran (35) became concerned and went in search of Krishanti. They were also murdered and buried in shallow graves within the army base.
- On 7 August 1996, in Kalvayal, Thenmarachchi, a father and daughter were stabbed to death by the Sri Lankan Army. The daughter was gang raped before being stabbed.
- On 15 August 1996, in Madduvil, Jaffna District, a student was gang raped and stabbed to death by members of the Sri Lankan Army.
- In late 1996, a Sri Lankan Army camp controlling Chemmani in Maniamthottam Road in Jaffna was used to torture and eliminate detainees. Among the victims included a Tamil couple who lived near the camp in the direction of the Kandy Road. The wife was raped by the Sri Lankan soldiers before being killed. The naked bodies of the dead detainees were then taken to Chemmani for mass burial.
- Army Corporal Somaratna Rajapaksa (27), who served in Jaffna during 1995–96, claimed that he could identify the locations of mass graves where the army had buried hundreds of murdered Tamils. Rajapaksa claimed to be a scapegoat for the rape and murder of Tamil schoolgirl Krishanthi Kumaraswamy. He stated from the dock: "We did not kill anyone. We only buried bodies. We can show you where 300 to 400 bodies have been buried." He further described how Army members had raped Tamil civilians, including one Captain Lalith Hewa:

"One day I was asked to bring a mammoty [type of spade] by Captain Lalith Hewa. When I took it to him he was with a woman who had no clothes on. This woman and her husband were brought to the camp earlier that day. Lalith Hewa had raped the woman and later attacked her and her husband with the mammoty I brought to him. Both of them died. Lalith Hewa tried to bury them there himself but he couldn't do it. Then the bodies were brought to Chemmani. I can show you where the bodies were buried."

- Nearly a hundred Tamil girls went missing between 30 March and 29 August 1996 in Kankesanthurai, Jaffna District. Several rapes of Tamil women by the Sri Lankan Army in Jaffna District were also reported by refugees who fled to India.
- On 8 September 1996, 6 Sri Lankan soldiers gang raped a Tamil woman named Vasuki in Jaffna District.
- On 10 September 1996, Sri Lankan soldiers gang raped a Tamil woman (55) who worked in the Thirunelvely Co-operative Milk Society.
- On 30 September 1996, 23-year-old Rajini Velauthapillai from Urumpirai was abducted by the Sri Lankan Army at a Kondavil checkpoint in Jaffna. She was dragged into a nearby house, gang raped and murdered by the soldiers. Her naked dead body was later found discarded in a cesspit. An inquiry by the military police led to the arrest of six soldiers in October. After years of delay, three soldiers were tried and sentenced to death for the crime in 2001. However, in late 2023 Sri Lanka's Court of Appeal acquitted two of the convicted soldiers of all charges.
- On 3 November 1996, in Kalkudah, Batticaloa District, a Tamil woman Kanapathipillai Sornamma (35) was gang raped by five Sri Lankan soldiers.
- On 12 November 1996, Sri Lankan soldiers gang raped a 10 year old Tamil schoolgirl Selvarajah Renuka in Pathmeni, Achchuveli in the Jaffna District. At 8:15, the child was abducted by the soldiers on her way to school. She was taken to the Puttur army camp where she was stripped and raped repeatedly. After the soldiers had finished they released the child. The principal of her school later took Renuka with him to lodge a complaint at the Achchuveli-Atchelu main army camp, but was forcibly taken off the camp by soldiers. On the 14th and 15th, students from three local schools (Achchuveli Maha Vidyalayam, Neervely Aththiar school and Sri Somaskanthe College) stayed at home in protest. No one was held accountable for this crime.
- In late 1996, Vanni MP S Shanmuganathan reported that many Tamil women had been sexually abused by the Sri Lankan police at the Poonthottam school camp, Vavuniya. One raped woman had to be hospitalized at Vavuniya hospital.
- The South China Morning Post reported that more than 150 women, mostly Tamils, were raped by police and armed forces personnel in 1996 according to human rights activists. In some instances the victims were subsequently killed. One case involved a woman from Batticaloa district who approached a police officer for directions to her relative's home in Colombo. The policeman accompanied the woman to her destination before raping her in a secluded suburban thicket. In June 1996, two navy officers were detained for raping a woman. Human rights groups and Tamil political parties also complained about the alleged rape of five women by policemen in the suburbs of Colombo.
- On 22 November 1996, the pro-rebel TamilNet reported the death of a young Tamil woman who was violently gang raped by 8 Sri Lankan soldiers in Vavuniya. The woman was detained along with thousands of other Tamils in an unhygienic, detention camp where she was assaulted. She was rushed to hospital following the assault, but succumbed to her injuries.
- On 31 December 1996, a Tamil woman called S.Sivasothy was taking lunch to her husband working in a paddy field in Mandur, Batticaloa District. On her way she was raped by the Special Task Force attached to the Vallavethy Special Task Force (STF) Camp.
- In December 1996, Sri Lankan soldiers stationed at Mayilampaveli raped a Tamil woman called P.Vanitha at the Mayilampaveli Housing Scheme, Batticaloa District.

=== 1997 ===
- Amnesty International received multiple reports of rape by the army both in Vavuniya and Jaffna in 1997. In Batticaloa, police, army and STF were also held responsible for rape.
- In 1997, in Jaffna District, 3 cases of rape against Tamil women committed by the Sri Lankan Army were taken to the magistrates' court; one case from Chavakachcheri in May, one case from Araly in June, and another case from Vadamarachchi.
- On 1 January 1997, a Tamil woman was raped by a Special Task Force (STF) member at Vellaveli, Batticaloa District. The victim later identified the STF member who had raped her.
- On 9 January 1997, in Thiyavattavan, Batticaloa District, Sri Lankan soldiers raped 3 Tamil women—a mother and her two daughters. A week later, two army soldiers suspected of the crime were taken into custody by police.
- In February 1997, a 15 year old Tamil girl was tortured and sexually assaulted by Sri Lankan soldiers at the Patpodi Army camp in Batticaloa District. The soldiers had kicked and hit her with clubs, poured petrol on her face, and submerged her in water. They also pinched her bottom, touched her breasts and asked her sexually obscene questions.
- In March 1997, a Tamil woman working at Kalliankaadu garment factory on Kalladi Road, Batticaloa was raped by a paramilitary group allied to the Sri Lankan Armed forces.
- On 17 March 1997, two sisters aged 34 and 28 were raped by 4 Sri Lankan soldiers at their home in Mayilampaveli, Batticaloa district. The soldiers from the Mayilampaveli army camp forced their way into the house at 11 pm, before taking the two sisters outside and raping them repeatedly. Four accused soldiers initially held by authorities were released with no one being charged. Vasantha then attempted to commit suicide by swallowing poison, after leaving a note to her prospective husband, saying that she was unable to continue living after what happened to her.
- On 17 May 1997 at 11 pm, Murugesapillai Koneswary, a mother of 4 was gang raped and killed by 4 Sinhalese police officers in Kalmunai. The perpetrators had sexually harassed her earlier in the day. Her four-year-old daughter described some "uncles with guns" had entered the hut, carried the little girl outside and left her near a neighbor's fence. According to villagers, on that night, the woman had sent her three other children to her relatives who were living nearby. The little girl is the only witness to the ensuing crime. After the assault the victim was killed by exploding a grenade in her vagina. No one was convicted for the crime.
- On 19 May 1997, a Tamil woman (37) was raped by Sri Lankan soldiers in Madduvil North, Jaffna District.
- On 12 July 1997, a Tamil woman (20) was raped by Sri Lankan soldiers in Alvai, Jaffna District.
- On 17 July 1997, a Tamil woman (17) was raped by Sri Lankan soldiers in Araly, Jaffna District.
- On 5 August 1997, a Tamil woman (37) was raped by Sri Lankan soldiers in Maavadivembu, Batticaloa District.
- On 19 August 1997, a Tamil woman was raped by Sri Lankan soldiers in Vipulananda Street, Valaichchenai.
- On 5 September 1997, a 6 year old Tamil child was gang raped by Sri Lankan soldiers as she passed a checkpoint on her way to school in Achchuveli, Jaffna District.
- In October 1997, human rights groups reported a dead Tamil woman's body with both breasts cut off being washed up on the shores.
- On 15 October 1997, a Tamil woman (49) was raped and killed by Sri Lankan security forces in Amparai District. Her son reported how her genitals were also butchered after the assault.
- On 28 October 1997, a 40 year old Tamil woman was found unconscious after being abducted and raped by Sri Lankan soldiers in Manthikai, Jaffna District. She was abducted on 24 October. Following the assault, she was admitted to Manthikai hospital in a traumatised state with injuries to her vagina.
- On 29 October 1997, a young Tamil girl was gang raped by multiple SLA soldiers. Following the assault she attempted suicide by drinking kerosene.
- On 6 November 1997, a Tamil woman (17) was raped by Sri Lankan soldiers in Pallai, Jaffna District.
- On 25 December 1997, a Tamil woman called K. Amutha was raped by Sri Lankan Police in Vidathaltheevu, Mannar District.
- On 27 December 1997, a Tamil woman (31) was raped by the Special Task Force in Sorikkalmunai, Amparai District.
- Tamil M.P. Joseph Pararajasingam reported there had been a minimum of 60 rape cases of Tamil women involving the Sri Lankan security forces in his parliamentary constituency of Batticaloa in 1997.
- A Lancet review of 184 Tamil male torture victims in the United Kingdom, who had been detained and tortured by Sri Lankan authorities between 1997 and 1998 revealed that 21% (38) had been sexually abused. Many had been raped by the soldiers or forced to give oral masturbation, and one victim also described how soldiers forced him and his friends to rape each other for the soldiers' 'entertainment'. Methods of torture employed during the abuse include:
  - the electrocution or beating of genitals.
  - cigarette burns to the genitals.
  - anal penetration with chilli coated sticks.
  - Putting the victim's penis in a heavy desk drawer and repeatedly shutting it to cause trauma.

=== 1998 ===
- In January 1998, a Tamil girl (17) was left physically paralyzed from the waist down after being gang raped by Sinhalese soldiers.
- On 14 March 1998, in Thirunelveli, Jaffna, a 3 month old pregnant Tamil woman was raped by a Sri Lankan Police constable.
- On 17 March 1998, a woman named Sinnapody Selvaranee (28) who lived with her mother in Vembirai, Meesalai North, Thenmarachchi was raped by Sri Lankan soldiers. Following the rape, she tried to commit self-immolation by dousing herself with kerosene. This suicide attempt was stopped by her relatives nearby when they smelt the kerosene. They also discovered her bleeding heavily from the vagina. Selvaranee then communicated to her relatives that the army had taken her by knifepoint near the Meesalai army checkpoint to a secluded area and then raped her. At 6 pm she was taken to Jaffna Hospital where a vaginal tear was stitched under anesthetic to stop the heavy bleeding.
- On 14 April 1998, at around 3:30pm, Selvaraasa Vasantha, a married mother of one, was raped by a Sri Lankan soldier inside the Karthika restaurant on Main Street, Point Pedro. The rape was witnessed by the owner of the restaurant V. Vijayakumari who made a complaint to the Sri Lankan Police and was due to make an appearance at an inquiry to be held on 16 April. SLA soldiers threatened her to withdraw her complaint, to which she refused. On the day of the inquiry, two Sri Lankan soldiers entered her restaurant in civilian clothing and ordered tea. They then covered her head with a pot, poured petrol over her and set her alight. All attempts by neighbours to douse the flames were blocked by the soldiers. After 45 minutes she was taken to the local hospital where she died.
- On 15 April 1998, a Tamil girl called P. Ajanthanaa (17) was raped by Sri Lankan Police at Ariyaalai, Jaffna District. She was later admitted to hospital with heavy vaginal bleeding.
- On 7 May 1998, a intellectually disabled Tamil woman (36) was raped by Sri Lankan soldiers in Nochchikkulam, Mannar District.
- On 22 June 1998, a Tamil woman called K.Ragini (23) was raped by Sri Lankan soldiers in Panichchankerni, Batticaloa District.
- On 25 June 1998, Kanthasamy Kalanithy (26) was ordered by the army commander of Mirusuvil army camp in Jaffna to marry one of his soldiers. He forced her to stand in front of 10 Sri Lankan soldiers and told her to choose one of them. When she screamed in protest, the soldiers proceeded to gang rape her.
- On 16 July 1998, a Tamil woman called N. Bhavani (46) was raped by Sri Lankan soldiers in Thirunelvely, Jaffna.
- In a submission to the UN on 12 August 1998, the World Organization against Torture stated:

"Sri Lankan soldiers have raped both women and young girls on a massive scale, and often with impunity, since reporting often leads to reprisals against the victims and their families.."

- In April 1998, the Sri Lankan Army raped two young Tamil women in Uduvil, Jaffna District. One of the victims was a student (24) imprisoned for mistaken identity. She was tortured by being hung upside down from a bar and burned with cigarettes. Eventually, she was taken with another female inmate to a remote area and raped. She recounted the sexual assault as follows:

"The one who had brought us there came up to me and the other soldier went up to the other girl...we started screaming. The one with me stuffed a handkerchief into my mouth and began fondling and cuddling me. He touched and squeezed my breasts. He sucked my cheek. ... We were behind a bush. I tried to push him away but he pulled and tore my blouse. Then he pulled my bra off. He removed his trousers. He took off my knickers. Then he was naked and he did everything he had to do to me. It was too painful to me. He raped me. The whole ordeal lasted about 1/2 hour."

- On 8 September 1998, a pogrom was unleashed on Plantation Tamils in Ratnapura where 200 organized Sinhalese goons with the support of local Sinhalese politicians burnt down 800 houses. Several rapes of Tamil women in the area by Sinhalese thugs were also reported. The pogrom was sparked by the murder of two Sinhalese youths, one of them Bandusena, who had a reputation for raping women and being involved in illegal liquor sales. The Sinhalese attackers were given full impunity by the local police and no one was held accountable for their crimes.
- On 17 October 1998, members of the Sri Lankan Navy were alleged to have raped a 16 year old Tamil girl in her home in Vaddukottai after they had beaten her parents.

=== 1999 ===
- The British Refugee Council noted in its Sri Lanka monitor that between February and July 1999 more than 45 cases of rape by the Sri Lanka Army were reported in the North-East.
- On 12 July 1999, members of the Sri Lanka Army gang raped and killed Ida Carmelitta (19), a Tamil woman from the town of Pallimunai, in Mannar district. On the night of her murder, five men broke into her mother's house, and, after tying up the occupants, proceeded to gang rape and kill her. In his report, the coroner in Mannar documented evidence of rape and sexual violence, including bites on her breasts and lips. She had been shot through her vagina. Two of the suspects, a corporal and a soldier of the Sri Lankan Army were identified at an identification parade by witnesses and taken into custody. However, after two key witnesses were threatened and subsequently fled to India, the case is no longer proceeding.
- On 10 September 1999, 35 year old Rukmani Krishnapillai, a mother of 5, was taken by the Sri Lankan army to their camp in Kumburumoolai, Batticaloa District. She was then drugged and gang raped. She was also beaten and had objects put into her vagina. Following the torture, she was then dumped in the jungle. She refused to take any legal action fearing repercussions to her family.
- On 17 December 1999, a Tamil woman called N. Vijayalatchumi (19) was raped by a paramilitary group at Kalmadu, Valaichchenai.
- On 28 December 1999, the Sri Lankan Navy gang raped and killed the Tamil Brahmin woman Sarathambal Saravanbavananthatkurukal (29), after forcibly dragging her out from her home, in Pungututheevu. Her house was situated at about 500 m from the nearest naval base and her father and brother were tied up by four security officers dressed in black. Her dead body was found on barren land about 100 m away from their home the next day. A post-mortem confirmed the cause of death was "asphyxia due to gagging; her underpants had been stuffed inside her mouth, and that forcible sexual intercourse had taken place". The victim's father and brother were threatened not to reveal the identity of the four men who came to the house, and the sailors who raped Sarathambal were transferred from the area to prevent action being taken against them.

== 2000s ==
=== 2000 ===
- On 12 January 2000, the Asian Human Rights Commission (AHRC) proclaimed that government forces were using systematic rape as a weapon of war:

"Sri Lankan security forces are using systematic rape and murder of Tamil women to subjugate the Tamil population... Impunity continues to reign as rape is used as a weapon of war in Sri Lanka."

- Between 21 and 27 June 2000, Yogalingam Vijitha, a 27-year-old Tamil woman from Kayts was tortured by policemen in a Negombo police station. She was badly assaulted and raped with a chili coated hard cone-like object (a plantain tree flower). The policemen beat her with poles all over her body and trampled on her with boots. They also inserted pins under the nails of her fingers and toes, and slapped her ears.

At one time, they put a bag filled with chili powder and petrol over her face, whilst she was stripped to her underwear. A subsequent medical examination confirmed she had been tortured and raped, with "many scars on her limbs and torso". Due to the attack she was suffering from post traumatic stress disorder. No one was held accountable for these crimes.

- A Hindu priest named Barmasiri Chandraiyer Ragupathi Sharma who has been detained since 2000 under the draconian Prevention of Terrorism Act was subjected to degrading treatment in police custody. His sacred thread was cut and he was fed meat and alcohol against his religious beliefs. He was also tortured with a barbed wire pipe being inserted into his rectum and his genitals being slammed in a drawer.
- In late October 2000, following the Bindunuwewa massacre of Tamil detainees, Sinhalese mob violence spread to other areas of the Hill Country where estate Tamils were attacked and three women were abducted and raped.

=== 2001 ===
- On 1 February 2001, a Tamil woman called T. Ananthy (28) was raped by the Special Task Force at Cheddipalayam, Batticaloa District.
- On 19 March 2001, in Mannar, the Sri Lankan Navy and police gang raped two Tamil women, Sivamany, a 24-year-old mother of three, and Wijikala, a pregnant 22-year-old. After being taken into custody, Wijikala was blindfolded by a police officer named Rajah, before being beaten and forcibly stripped. She was then mounted by two men in succession who both raped her, while others held her down. Sivamany also testified hearing Wijikala screaming and pleading for mercy. Some policemen then told her how they were raping Wijikala and that they would do the same to her. She was then blindfolded with a sock by a navy officer in a van, before being stripped and raped for 15 minutes. Both victims were then brought into the office of the police where they were forced to parade naked in front of the security forces. Finally, they were both made to crouch and had their hands and legs tied to a pole which was placed between two tables to keep them hanging. They were then left in that position for 90 minutes, whilst being poked in the genitals, pinched and beaten with thick wire. A subsequent medical examination confirmed that both women had been raped and tortured, with multiple nail marks being present on the limbs of Wijikala. Despite the victims identifying three police officers and nine navy personnel as the perpetrators, no one was held accountable for the crimes due to government intervention.
- On 20 April 2001, Vijayaratnam Subashini (19), was sexually assaulted by more than 10 navy officers. She was captured from a LTTE boat after returning from the open sea and being surrounded by the navy. Once she was brought on to the navy gunboat, she was stripped naked, blindfolded and had her hands tied behind her back. More than 10 navy officers then touched and squeezed her breasts and genital area. They also penetrated her vagina with their fingers one by one while she was screaming. The whole sexual assault lasted around 2 hours. Thangiah Vijayalalitha, a 14-year-old girl, was also captured from the same LTTE boat by the navy and was sexually assaulted by more than 10 navy officers on the same navy gunboat. No one was held accountable for these sexual assaults and both Tamil females were held without charge at the Welikade women's prison in Colombo.
- On 31 May 2001, in Neervely, Jaffna District, Poomani Saravanai (70) was gang raped by two Sri Lankan Army soldiers in front of her son. Despite identifying the 2 guilty soldiers the next day, the police did not initiate any charges.
- On 24 June 2001, in Colombo, Velu Arshadevi (28), a widowed Tamil mother of two was forcefully taken to a Sri Lankan army camp at 3 am by a Sinhalese policeman called S. Premathilake. She was then gang raped for the next hour and a half by the policeman and two of his colleagues, despite crying out for her attackers to stop. After being gang raped, the rapists threatened her not to tell anyone.
- Mahendiran Nageswari (37), a Tamil woman from Kaluthavalai, Batticaloa District was sexually abused by STF members from the local STF camp in Kaluthavalai. She was admitted to Batticaloa Teaching Hospital following the assault.
- In the first week of June 2001, two Tamil women Sivarajani and Vimaladevi who were initially residing in a hotel in Bambalapitiya, Colombo complained of being gang-raped by Sri Lankan police after being taken into a police station.
- On 7 July 2001, in Meesalai, Jaffna District, a Tamil woman called Thambipillai Thanalakshmi (42) was gang raped by 3 Sri Lankan soldiers in a rice field. Her 82 year old partially deaf mother tried to intervene, but was assaulted by the soldiers.
- On 12 September 2001, a Tamil woman named Ms S Umadevi (23) was abducted, raped and murdered at Kopiwatte near Nawalapitiya. She was abducted after walking home from class in Nawalapitiya town. Her parents reported her missing to the Nawalapitiya police station on the morning of 13 September. However, the police were uncooperative and refused to display her photo as a missing person. Her body was later identified that evening near the Malkanda bridge. Her father then reported the murder to the police at Nawalapitiya and gave them a possible suspect. However, the police did not arrest any suspects, nor visit the family's home to conduct an investigation into the atrocity.
- In 2001, a Tamil woman named Parvati was raped by the Sri Lankan Army due to her husband being a member of the LTTE. Two men dragged her into the kitchen and raped her after they entered the house looking for her husband.
- In 2001, it was estimated that every two weeks a Tamil woman was raped by the Sri Lankan Army or police, and that every 2 months a Tamil woman was gang raped and murdered by the same forces.

=== 2002 ===
- In early January 2002, two married Tamil women were abducted by armed men and gang raped in Addalaichenai, Amparai District. The 2 sisters had gone to work in rice fields. No action was taken by the police to apprehend the rapists.
- A 35-year-old widow in Thiruperunthurai, close to Batticaloa town, accused a LTTE cadre, "Gadaffi," of attempted rape. The woman had lodged a complaint at the LTTE office in Batticaloa. However, LTTE men there had started acting threateningly towards the woman. A complaint was lodged with the local Monitoring Mission. It was believed Gadaffi was later disciplined by the LTTE.
- On 22 October 2002, in Kalnattinakulam, Vavuniya District, a Tamil woman called Lucia Natchathiram visited the paddy fields in the evening to see to her goats. She did not return and the villagers launched a search party, eventually finding her dead body at 6 am the following day. A post mortem at Vavuniya hospital revealed that she had been gang raped before being strangled. The field where she had last been was frequented by Sri Lankan army personnel from the Iratperiyakulam army camp and local Sinhalese home guards. The Sri Lankan police were reluctant to investigate the crime.

=== 2003 ===
- According to the US State Department report on human rights in Sri Lanka in 2003, there were several rapes of women committed by Sri Lankan security forces. Despite this, there were no successful convictions and impunity prevailed. On 23 October, two policemen attempted to rape a Tamil woman called Mrs. Selvarajah at Uyilankulam in Mannar District. On 26 August, three soldiers attempted to rape a woman in Vadamarachchi in the Jaffna District.
- On 19 December 2003, a Tamil youth Yogarajah Antony (22), a former LTTE member who was then working under the local LTTE intelligence chief, was accused of the rape and murder of a Tamil female called Nishanthini Shanthalingam (17). The LTTE took Antony to their custody giving the impression they would punish him.

=== 2004 ===
- In October 2004, the Special Task Force abducted the 19-year-old brother of a Tamil Catholic priest in Amparai District. He was kept in a STF camp for 2 weeks and severely tortured. He was also sodomized and gang raped by the STF when they were drunk. Upon release, the victim could hardly walk or talk, and was hunched due to repeated beatings on his spine. His genitals were swollen and his face was disfigured with cigarettes burns. His body was also bruised all over. As a result of the torture he developed post-traumatic depression and suicidal tendencies.

=== 2005 ===
- In early 2005, the Sri Lankan Army raped a Tamil woman in Batticaloa District, who gave the following account:

"Two persons who were armed and in their uniform entered the house saying that they wanted to search the house. They talked in Sinhala language. At that time I was all alone at home, as my parents had gone to one of our relatives' house which is at a distance away from our home. While talking with me, one of the men who had come forcefully dragged me and committed the crime by force."

- On 5 March 2005, 50 Tamil refugees (including 27 women) returning from India disembarked on a sand bank near Talaimannar. 5 armed men then robbed them and raped 5 of the women. One of the rape victims was Rajitha Rajan (25), whose husband Mylvaganam Rajan confirmed she was raped at gunpoint. The locals held the Sri Lankan Navy to be the prime suspect for these crimes.
- On 16 December 2005, a Tamil woman called Ilayathamby Tharsini (20) was brutally raped and killed in her home town of Pungudutheevu. Earlier that day she was on her way to her aunt's place, before being abducted by unknown men close to a Sri Lankan Navy post. Her body was found the next day, completely naked, in an abandoned well near the Sri Lankan Navy camp at a place called Maduthuveli. A Sri Lankan Navy hat was found at the crime scene. According to the post mortem report conducted at Jaffna Teaching Hospital she was brutally raped before strangulation. She had also suffered numerous injuries throughout her body caused by fingernails and biting, including a severely bitten breast. After the body was found locals violently protested in front of the Navy camp who they blamed for the crime.
- On 23 December 2005, an LTTE claymore mine killed 15 Navy officers in Pesalai, Mannar District. In retaliation, the navy went on a rampage through the village. First they raided all the houses and beat up anyone who protested. Nirmala Rose Mary, a Tamil mother of 6, witnessed her neighbor being gang raped by a few Navy men. She saw the navy officers rip open the young girl's upper garment, before they raped her. After raping her they stomped on her chest, abusing her for being a Tamil. Then her hut was torched, and civilian property was looted. The village was left in flames.

=== 2006 ===
- On 30 January 2006, five Tamil aid workers of Tamils Rehabilitation Organisation were abducted by the pro-government TMVP paramilitary group in Welikanda. Four of the male aid workers were tortured and shot dead by TMVP cadres. One abductee, a 25-year-old woman named Premini Thanuskodi, was gang raped by over 14 TMVP cadres in succession before being hacked to death.
- On 12 April 2006, following a pogrom against Tamils in Trincomalee, a surge in rape of Tamil women by the Sri Lankan security forces was reported. During the pogrom, 4 Tamil women were abducted from a shop in a van and then subsequently raped and robbed. In Anbuvelipuram, a suburb of Trincomalee, a doctor reported many incidents of rape of Tamil women committed by the Sri Lankan Navy and home-guards. These included one 18-year-old girl and two older women who had consulted him.
- The doctor also reported three girls from Jaffna living at 3rd mile post, Trincomalee who were raped at night by security forces in their own home a few months later. Another case involved a Tamil woman being raped in front of her husband in Kanniya, Trincomalee District. Finally, 3–4 poor Tamil women were raped in Maharambaikkulam, Vavuniya by military intelligence operatives in the same time period.
- On 21 April 2006, following a claymore mine explosion in Kiliveddy, Trincomalee, an organized Sinhalese mob killed several Tamils and burnt 45 houses in the Tamil villages of Menkamam and Bharathipuram. Several Tamil women were also raped in the attack.
- On 8 June 2006, Sri Lankan soldiers brutally tortured and killed a family of four in Vankalai, Mannar District. The victims were carpenter Sinnaiah Moorthy Martin (38), his wife Mary Madeleine (27), and their two children, daughter Anne Lakshika (9) and son Anne Dilakshan (7). The wife was raped and killed. The two children were hacked to death and hanged in nooses from the neck. Dilakshan was disemboweled with his gut protruding from his stomach, whilst Anne Lakshika was raped with her father's carpenter tools. The father was also killed and hanged. Earlier that day three soldiers were seen by villagers at the entrance to the Martin home. The locals blamed the Sri Lankan Army for the atrocity; and stated that the security personnel stationed there were uncouth and engaged in indecent behavior such as exhibiting condoms to the schoolgirl population. No one was held accountable for the crime.
- On 4 July 2006, Ambalavanar Punithavathy, 43, a Tamil woman from Uduvil in Jaffna was shot dead after being gang raped late at night by the Sri Lankan army. The assailants forced entry into her home under the pretext of searching the house. The victim's elderly mother was also attacked, and admitted to Jaffna Teaching hospital with serious injuries.
- In August 2006, a massacre of aid workers was carried out in Muttur, Trincomalee District. University Teachers for Human Rights (Jaffna) reported that a Muslim home guard called Jehangir had committed the massacre after he had sworn to 'kill all Tamils'. Jehangir was also noted to have raped several Tamil women.
- In 2006, the British Refugee Council conducted a study of rape among asylum seekers in the UK. Half of the 153 women who had been raped were Sri Lankan Tamils.
- According to the anti-LTTE UTHR(J), a woman linked to the Mallavi area alleged that LTTE cadres working in the farm raped three Estate Tamil women settled in the north.
- In December 2006, PT, a 23 year old Tamil male was abducted from his home in Vavuniya by the Sri Lanka Army. He was taken to the Joseph Camp where he was detained in a toilet for 28 days. Every day he would be taken into a separate torture room and hung upside down and beaten with sand filled pipes. He was also burned with cigarettes and sexually abused at night. This included inserting a beer bottle into his anus, crushing his penis and beating him with wires. On one occasion they hung him upside down with his head touching the used toilet bowl and told him they would make him eat his own feces.

=== 2007 ===
- In 2007, the TMVP and EPDP paramilitary groups were involved in forcibly trafficking Tamil women and children into sex slavery. The EPDP operated child trafficking rings on Delft island which the EPDP "owns". They took Tamil children and sold them into slavery in prostitution rings and slave labour camps in India and Malaysia. The children were smuggled out of the country with connivance of Customs and Immigration officials at the Colombo Airport. The EPDP also forced young Tamil women to have sex with 5-10 Sri Lankan soldiers a night in prostitution rings. Likewise, the TMVP also forced Tamil women from IDP camps to join prostitution rings.
- In 2007, a young Tamil woman from Jaffna who had come to Colombo to study, was arrested and detained by security forces. In detention, she was tortured and sexually abused, suffering cigarette burns to her thighs and rape with an object. After release, she attempted to leave the country and was offered help by a Sri Lankan Muslim man who said he would arrange the travel and paperwork. However, on arrival he took her to a hotel where he raped her multiple times.
- In 2007, a Tamil woman was taken into custody by security forces, who would ply her with alcohol before raping her. A female officer helped orchestrate the rapes, which were often filmed and photographed. She was threatened with death if she dared report the rapes, and became suicidal as a result.
- In September 2007, a Tamil man Roy Manojkumar Samathanam (40) was arrested by Sri Lankan security officers and detained for a year. He was accused of aiding the LTTE by importing electronic equipment, a charge he denies. During his detention he was tortured regularly. He also witnessed other detainees being hit with cricket wickets, electrocuted, and anally raped with iron rods.
- In 2007, Sri Lankan security forces were involved in raping the dead bodies of female LTTE cadres using their weapons. A trophy video showing the grotesque sexual violations was exposed by Channel 4 News in 2014. In the video, cheerful Sinhalese soldiers laugh and cheer as they rape the dead bodies.
- On 28 December 2007, the Sri Lankan Army gang-raped a woman in Jaffna, according to a women's welfare organization.
- According to the US State Department report on human rights in Sri Lanka in 2007, the resumption of war led to an increase in sexual violence perpetrated by government forces. Human rights groups based in the north reported that government forces were sexually exploiting the wives of men who had 'disappeared'. In the east, Sri Lankan military action displaced 300,000 Tamil civilians by mid 2007. There were widespread reports that the security forces were sexually abusing displaced females after detaining the men. By the end of 2007, documented reports of the security forces raping Tamil women in the western Batticaloa District continued. The victims were usually wives and daughters of Tamil men who were temporarily detained by security forces.

=== 2008 ===
- On 25 February 2008, a Tamil girl called Nagaraja Jeyarani (16) was raped and killed by unknown persons in Nediyamadukerni, Batticaloa District. She was on her way to her father's house when the crime occurred.
- In April 2008, a 17 year old Tamil child, BN, was taken by security forces from his home in Vavuniya to the Veppankulam camp, as his father was alleged to be an LTTE member. He was then raped and tortured for 2 weeks.
- During March–May 2008, the STF launched an operation to video and register all Tamil families in the village of Kolavil near Akkaraipattu. Following this operation, members of the STF broke into houses where Tamil women were living without males, and committed several rapes. 12 cases of rape of this nature were documented in March 2008.
- On 10 May 2008, in Kalmunai, three drunken armed men from the STF invaded the mud house of a Tamil woman called Seetha. Her two daughters aged 16 and 18 were then raped in front of her, while she was gagged and bound. The girls were left in a pool of blood, with second one becoming unconscious. Later that evening, security forces returned to intimidate the family into silence. The father of the family was beaten, and the older daughter was abducted in a white van never to be seen again.
- In 2008, a Tamil woman named Sudarini was taken into custody by Sri Lankan security forces, where she was tortured and raped for a month. Every night, a group of female officers would take her from her dark cell into another room of male guards to be gang raped. One night, the officers filmed her being gang raped and threatened to publicly humiliate her with the footage if she ever dared to tell anyone.
- In 2008, multiple Tamil women were raped by the security forces in villages north of Vavuniya. The security forces entered the houses at night and forced the women to come with them, before dropping them back in the morning. 20 Tamil victims of rape have been recorded, some of whom were impregnated following the ordeal.
- A Tamil female who was detained by the security forces at TID headquarters in 2008, reported that Tamil women would be called into private rooms by the officers and sexually abused with impunity. She observed members from all branches of the security forces taking part in this abuse including the Army, Navy, CID and intelligence services.
- In June 2008, PR, a 26 year old Tamil man was repeatedly raped by a Police officer called KK (along with other detainees) at the Dehiwela police station. He later recounted:

"Everybody knew that when he [KK] takes someone out of the cell, he will rape them."

- In August 2008 alone, 14 cases of rape of Tamil women in Vavuniya by paramilitaries were documented by a NGO in a Civil Society Field Mission report. The victims were between the ages of 12 and 35.
- In October 2008, Mugil a former LTTE cadre witnessed the Sri Lankan Army rape and execute 5 young Tamil conscripts in a mango orchard near Kilinochchi. She narrowly escaped by climbing up a mango tree when the army arrived. The army 'boys' ripped the clothes of the 5 Tiger girls, beat them and then started to rape them. The girls were all screaming out in Tamil, except one who repeatedly screamed the Sinhala word 'epa' ('I don't want'). When the assault was over, all that remained below her were 5 dead bodies lying still in the mud. The naked corpses of the girls were contorted in their last moments of struggle.
- In November 2008, a 34 year old Tamil civilian woman Mrs. RN was taken into custody by the security forces after a search operation at her uncle's house in Trincomalee. She was then raped and tortured by the security forces.

=== 2009 ===
About 300,000 Tamil civilians displaced in the final stages of the Sri Lankan Civil War were detained by the Sri Lankan security forces in several camps in Vavuniya District, known by the generic name "Manik Farm", which was then the largest refugee camp in the world. The camps were known for their poor conditions and incidents of sexual violence by the Sri Lankan security forces.

- An international aid worker who regularly visited the Manik Farm internment camp in Vavuniya District between January and May 2009 reported on multiple rapes committed by the security forces against Tamil women in the camps. The rapes would occur in several places, including near the female bathing area and at night when women were alone. The witness also observed multiple young Tamil girls being taken into custody by security forces under the pretence of 'investigation'. They would usually be taken during the night and then returned in the day after being sexually assaulted.
- A Tamil female detained in the Manik Farm camp in 2009 was gang raped by 4 Sri Lankan military personnel, including one identified as a captain in the military intelligence team who was in military uniforms. Her interrogators started off by groping her breasts and insulting her, threatening that she would be sent to a rehabilitation camp for many years if she did not cooperate. An insider witness confirmed that threatening pretty Tamil girls with rehabilitation for the purpose of rape was a common practice among his colleagues in the security forces who visited the Manik Farm camp. The Tamil female recounted the incident as follows:
  I was totally naked. I felt pain in my body. I did not know what I should do so I screamed. The man standing beside me reached down and placed his hand over my mouth. I was helpless. I was crying and I could not even cry for help. He told me to shut up. He used bad words and said that “if you scream again we will kill you”. He said that I was not to tell anyone of my interrogation and if I did they would “kill me in the night”. He said that they won the war and they wanted Tamil women to bear Sinhala children. They gave me my clothes. They watched me dress. They were still in a happy mood. I do not know the names of the four army officers who raped me. I never saw them again after the day they raped me.
- In January 2009, Valarmathi (26) was raped by a Sri Lankan soldier in a makeshift camp in the Vanni. As she understood some Sinhala, she remembered the humiliating words he said whilst he raped her:

"You are so fit, you must be a Tiger."

To her horror, as he left, he also uttered the following words to her:

"They don't allow you to have sex, no wonder you're so hungry for it."

- In January 2009, OP, a 20 year old Tamil male was arrested during a random search at Colombo International airport because his ID card showed Puthukkudiyiruppu, a LTTE stronghold. He was then taken to the Boosa camp where he was tortured and raped for 5 months.
- A Special Task Force constable was found guilty of raping a 13-year old Tamil girl in Vellaveli, Batticaloa in February 2009.
- During early 2009 in Kilinochchi, a Tamil family witnessed the Sri Lankan Army defiling the corpses of female LTTE cadres whilst they were 'uttering deranged, hateful things as if to an animal'.
- In February 2009, during an electoral campaign speech, the Sri Lankan Prime Minister Ratnasiri Wickramanayake MP, said that if the leader of the LTTE was captured alive he should be killed, and that if he were a 'girl', the army could have 'touched' and 'fiddled' with her body.
- In February 2009, Sri Lankan soldiers were witnessed raping multiple Tamil women. One female witness described how a group of civilians were crossing over to army held territory deep in the jungle. On arrival, the women were separated from the men, and several of them were raped, with some being killed. Another eyewitness saw a soldier enter a civilian tent in the internment camps in Vavuniya and rape a Tamil woman. Despite the rape being reported, no action was taken by the authorities.
- In February 2009, a 34 year old Tamil women who had worked for the LTTE was taken to a camp in Vavuniya by security forces. She was then tortured and gang raped by Sri Lankan soldiers over a 15-day period. She was raped so many times that she lost count.
- In early 2009, the Sri Lankan Army used the Kilinochchi Hospital as a soldiers' mess serving food and drinks for off duty soldiers, and providing Tamil girls as sex slaves. Two Tamil civilian girls who escaped the hospital confirmed that they were used as sex slaves by the army along with 50 other girls and rotated. They had initially escaped the shelling and surrendered themselves to the army at Visuvamadu, before being transported to the hospital. They were kept in the doctors' quarters and transferred in the nights to an upstairs room in a larger building, which was used as a guest house for soldiers. They were then raped by the soldiers. A local teacher also confirmed the accounts of two young Tamil women being repeatedly raped by the army in the hospital. A Tamil cleaner who was later sent to the hospital discovered discarded women's clothes and bloodstained handprints on the walls. Others sources heard frequent wailing and screaming of women from upstairs.
- During February and March 2009, an international aid worker observed at least 200 mutilated dead bodies of mainly Tamil women and young girls being held at a mortuary in a government hospital. The bodies of the Tamil women were naked and bore signs of rape and sexual mutilation. These included "knife wounds and long slashes, bite marks and deep scratches on the breasts, and vaginal mutation by knives, bottles and sticks". Most of the bodies also bore close range gunshot wounds to the head suggestive of execution.
- The same witness also observed on 6–7 occasions in February–April 2009, the digging of large trenches beyond the hospital with the use of back hoes. Trucks would then tip their cargo of naked dead bodies of mainly young females into the trenches.
- In 2009, a Tamil girl called Selvy was groped by a Sri Lankan soldier on a bus packed with displaced Tamil civilians. An elderly woman rescued Selvy from further sexual assault by placing herself between Selvy and the soldier.
- A 50-year-old Tamil grandmother told the Human Rights Watch that when she and her family, along with 20 others, surrendered to the Sri Lankan Army in Matalan in late March 2009, they were all forced to strip naked and all the women were made to walk around the soldiers in a circle while the soldiers laughed at them. All the women were then raped in front of everyone. The grandmother and her daughter were raped in front of her grandchildren; she was also later groped during a questioning.
- A Tamil woman called Gowri recounted that the army taunted Tamil women sexually, as they were herded into detention in 2009:

"All the time that we walked the soldiers were talking about us, saying, "These girls are ideal to satisfy our needs." They spoke in broken Tamil because they wanted us to know what they were up to and to frighten us,"

She then witnessed soldiers summon pretty young girls out of the line at gunpoint before raping them:

"I saw one girl going away and then heard screaming. I feared she had been raped behind the sentry post. I just kept on walking and didn't look because I was so scared. She was about eighteen or nineteen years old. I saw her taken out of the line in front of me and step through the barbed wire and be led away. I was afraid to turn back and look in case they saw me but when the path turned a corner I could see the girl behind the sentry post, crying, half naked, with all her clothes badly ripped. It was dreadful. I was very angry and disappointed. I felt helpless and afraid but I had to survive myself. Then in the shed where we were searched, another person asked if I'd also seen all the girls being taken away and raped."

- On 19 April 2009, KN, a 30 year old Tamil woman who fled the final warzone was taken to the Arunachalam camp in Vavuniya by the Sri Lankan Army. There she was raped multiple times by 4 -5 officials. She recounted: "I resisted each time and they would beat me and rape me. This went on for a week."
- In May 2009, the UK government deported a Tamil woman (51) back to Sri Lanka. On arrival, she was detained by security forces before being beaten, sexually abused and tortured. She gave the following statement:

"I was transferred to the Batticaloa army camp where I was treated like a slave. I was made to clean and do all the chores and treated very badly. I was kept in this army detention for nearly five months."

- On 5 May 2009, Channel 4 News exposed the dire conditions inside the internment camps in Vavuniya, where displaced Tamil civilians were being detained. An aid worker at the camp confirmed that young Tamil women were being abducted by Sri Lankan soldiers and raped with impunity:

"One elderly mother was crying inside the camp. I asked why. She said they'd taken her daughter away and she hadn't heard from her at all. There are many people taken from the camps that go missing. The women are sexually abused. Nobody dares to talk. They know they're being watched. They're afraid they'll go missing."

The aid worker further stated that women had to bathe in the open, and that the dead naked bodies of three women had been found at a bathing area of the camp called zone 2. This led to the UN requesting for the soldiers guarding the bathing area to be replaced by 20 female police officers, and for civilians, not the security forces, to investigate complaints of sexual abuse within the camp. Channel 4 News reporters were subsequently deported from the country by the Sri Lankan government after the exposé.

- Another witness confirmed that in May 2009, the dead naked bodies of Tamil girls were found near the river where the camp detainees bathed. The bodies had bite marks and other signs of sexual assault. Other witnesses described how security forces would sit in trees near the river and watch the women as they changed and bathed.
- In 2009, a 28 year old Tamil woman from Mullivaikkal who was detained at the Manik Farm camp was raped by a group of soldiers as she returned from the river where she would bathe every night. She recounted:

"One evening when I was returning after a bath with some others, suddenly a group of soldiers appeared. Some of the girls managed to scream and run away. I was raped."

- In 2009, a Tamil mother was taken from a camp in Vavuniya and separated from her family. She was repeatedly tortured and "taken to the Brigadier's room over a period of three months where her hands were tied to the bed and she was raped." The Brigadier threatened to kill her and her family, including her breast feeding infant, if she told anyone of the abuse.
- A Tamil witness who was detained in the Manik Farm camp for several months from May 2009, described how the army regularly took young, pretty Tamil girls for overnight 'interrogation' where they would be raped. The girls were often brought back in a crying state and would refuse to say what happened to them.
- Another three witnesses detained at the Manik Farm camp all reported accounts of young Tamil women and girls being raped in the camp. One of those witnesses who was detained between May and June 2009, saw camp guards sexually harass young girls and touch them against their will.
- In 2009, a senior employee of the NGO Caritas Internationalis reported that nearly 15 Tamil girls had been raped by the security forces within the camps in a short period of time.
- Sundari, a Tamil survivor living in Vanni, recounted to undercover journalists how Tamil girls were raped by the Sri Lankan Army in the detention camps in 2009.
- The UN Panel of Experts found that in 2009, Tamil women in the internment camps were forced by security forces to perform sexual acts in exchange for food and shelter.
- In May 2009, several Tamil women who escaped the war zone were gang raped and tortured in front of their families by Sri Lankan soldiers.
- In 2009, a mentally handicapped Tamil girl from the Vanni was imprisoned and used as a sex slave by the Sri Lankan Army for 18 months. She was dragged out and raped almost every night by Sri Lankan soldiers along with four other girls. As a result of the mass rapes she gave birth to a female baby.

In 2011, she was suffering daily nightmares of the experience and would wake up frightened, crying about what happened her to in that cell. She also had scars of cigarette burns on her genitalia. When assessed by a female psychiatrist in Oxford, she had a screaming fit when she saw a hospital porter in uniform and ran for her life. She also fell at the feet of the psychiatrist and begged her not to take her outside of the consulting room, as she was scared she would be raped outside. She could not bear to be touched even by the female doctor.

- In May 2009, Vasantha, who was forcibly recruited to the LTTE against her will in February 2009, surrendered to the army. She was taken to a rehabilitation camp where she was regularly raped by Sinhalese soldiers. She was a virgin before two drunk soldiers placed a bag sprayed with petrol over her head and raped her. She staggered to the toilet after in order to clean up the blood. She noticed all the other women detained with her also being taken away at night and always returning via the toilet after being raped. She frequently heard the screams of women from the main building where they were being taken. When she tried to resist the rapes, she was beaten violently and scratched so deeply that her back bled. On one occasion she was gang raped by five Sinhalese soldiers in succession, after they had burned her with cigarettes and beat her. She drifted in and out of consciousness during the ordeal. In the rehabilitation camp she was taught embroidery for 3 months, whilst being raped and tortured in between. She believed that she was taught embroidery in order to show others that the army were doing a good job in rehabilitation. She eventually escaped to the UK after her uncle paid a bribe to get her out of the camp. However, whilst in UK, her mother disappeared. She believed that the army caused the disappearance because they wanted revenge for her escape.
- In 2009, an LTTE cadre called Neriyen recalled hearing the screams of female LTTE members as they were being raped by the Sri Lankan Army in the distance. They were screaming 'Older brother, help us, save us!'.
- On 18 May 2009, Tamil journalist and newsreader Isaipriya (27) was captured by the Sri Lankan Army before being raped and executed. Video footage later broadcast by Channel 4 News showed Isaipriya alive and in the custody of the Sri Lankan military immediately before her death. Subsequent footage then showed Sri Lankan soldiers summarily executing captured Tamils. The video then showed a number of dead bodies including a naked Isaipriya with her hands tied behind her back, with a gash across her face and clear signs of sexual assault. An off-camera Sinhala voice is heard in the same video saying "I would like to fuck it again" in the segment showing the dead naked bodies of Isaipriya and another Tamil woman Ushalini Gunalingam (19).
- A Sinhalese soldier who served in the 58 Division of the Sri Lankan Army confirmed that his colleagues massacred, tortured and mass raped Tamils in 2009. He said that even wounded civilians in hospital were shown no mercy:

"When they were at the hospital, one day I saw a group of six soldiers raping a young Tamil girl. I saw this with my own eyes."

He tearfully recounted the heinous crimes committed by Sri Lankan soldiers:

"They shoot people at random, stab people, rape them, cut their tongues out, cut women's breasts off. I have witnessed all this with my own eyes.

I saw a lot of small children, who were so innocent, getting killed in large numbers. A large number of elders were also killed.

If they wanted to rape a Tamil girl, they could just beat her and do it. If her parents tried to stop them, they could beat them or kill them. It was their empire.

I saw the naked dead bodies of women without heads and other parts of their bodies. I saw a mother and child dead and the child's body was without its head."

- Other Tamils who were raped by the 58 Division claimed that the soldiers were told by their 'boss' to "do whatever you want to do to them". The commander of the 58 Division at the time was Shavendra Silva.
- In 2009, a senior officer in the army directly told a witness that he had personally participated with his officers in the gang rape of surrendering LTTE females. He further recounted to the witness, that after the females were raped, one of their legs would be tied to a tree, and the other tied to a tractor. The tractor would then speed off causing the women's body to tear apart.
- In 2009, a Tamil woman who joined the LTTE after her 2-year-old brother was killed in the 1995 Navaly church bombing surrendered to the Army. She was then taken to a camp in Anuradhapura where she was gang raped by soldiers on the first day. From then on she was raped at least 3 times a day, and witnessed fifty other female cadres being raped repeatedly. Senior officers and some Sinhala ministers also raped the prettiest cadres. As she was a leader in the LTTE Sothiya regiment, she was especially taunted and sexually tortured in a sadistic manner. She saw abusers laugh when they made Tamil women scream in pain by pouring petrol into their vaginas after rape. Upon release, she ended up becoming a prostitute to feed her children.
- The UN Panel of Experts referred to video footage and photos of naked bodies of sexually abused Tamil women taken by the Army as trophy videos in 2009. One video which was later broadcast by Channel 4 showed Sri Lankan soldiers loading the naked female bodies onto a truck in a disrespectful manner. The UN Panel of Experts stated:

"The Channel 4 video and photographs of what appear to be dead female cadre, including video footage in which the naked bodies of women are deliberately exposed, accompanied by lurid comments by SLA soldiers, raising a strong inference that rape or sexual violence may have occurred prior to or after execution."

- At the end of the war in 2009, Vijay, a Tamil civilian amputee was detained by security forces in his teens. He was wrongly assumed to be a LTTE member due to his injuries. He was subsequently tortured and sexually assaulted. He recounted being stripped and having hot chilli pasted all over his body, causing his body to burn all over, including in his eyes and genitals. He was also urinated on from both sides, both back and front. The officers also penetrated their penises into his mouth and ejaculated on him. Finally, they beat him all over his body using batons, including on his knees until they bled.
- On 6 July 2009, Al Jazeera reported on the internment camps in Vavuniya where more than 250,000 Tamil civilians were being detained behind barbed wire in appalling conditions. An international aid worker confirmed that several Tamil girls and women within the camp had become pregnant due to Sri Lankan Army rapes.
- In July 2009, aid workers confirmed that Sri Lankan officials were running a prostitution racket with displaced Tamil women in an internment camp in Pulmoddai, Trincomalee District. Senior government officials were aware of the racket but did nothing to stop it. The Sri Lankan foreign minister Palitha Kohona publicly denied the accusations, stating not a single woman was raped.
- In 2009, dozens of unmarried Tamil women in the camps had fallen pregnant and were separated from the other detainees to give birth to their babies, which were usually adopted out. Multiple people familiar with the affected women confirmed that several of the pregnancies were due to Army rapes.
- In 2009, a British medic confirmed that Sri Lankan soldiers were sexually abusing Tamil women in the internment camps, often trading food for sex. The soldiers would also freely touch the girls with impunity:

"The girls usually didn't talk back to them, because they knew that in the camp if they talked anything could happen to them. It was quite open, everyone could see the military officers touching the girls,"

- In 2009, a Tamil UN staff member made a distress call to an international aid worker in Colombo. The distraught man recounted how the army had rounded up pretty young Tamil women and girls from the internment camps under the guise of cooking and cleaning for Sinhalese construction workers. They were all put on a bus, including his wife. When they returned a few days later, they had all been gang raped.
- Many young Tamil women captured by the Sri Lankan Army were used as sex slaves. One woman called Vidhya Jayakumar recounted being sexually enslaved for 3 years in army camps following the end of war. Human rights lawyer Scott Gilmore described the case as the "worst account of sexual slavery" he had ever encountered. On the first night, Vidhya recalled being tied to a bed by Sinhalese female soldiers, before their commanding officer raped her violently. Subsequent to that, she was then detained in an army camp with other Tamil women, where every night, off-duty soldiers "would select a woman to rape". Later she was repeatedly raped at a police headquarters and another army camp.
- The mothers of former LTTE cadres told religious figures that their daughters were being raped every night by soldiers in the detention centres. Some women in the camps also committed suicide after becoming pregnant as a result of the frequent gang rapes.
- A young Tamil male was gang raped and starved for weeks in a secret camp under the suspicions of being a LTTE fighter. He was repeatedly told by the Sri Lankan Army that he would be taught a lesson.
- In 2009, two Tamils who were detained in the Joseph camp in Vavuniya described having barbed wire placed in their anus, which was then withdrawn to cause lacerations of the rectum. One victim fainted during this process. When he regained consciousness he saw blood all over the floor and was not able to move. The next day he could move a bit, and he noticed pieces of flesh coming out from his anus, "as if from a broiler chicken". One informer in the camp also saw a woman tied to a chair and being gang raped by multiple officers, "her breasts bitten and her body covered in scratch marks". The same informer also described how the military specifically targeted "beautiful girls" to rape at night. He also heard them bragging about raping at least 15 Tamil women each.
- The International Crisis Group confirmed that there were regular and credible reports of many Tamil women in the camps being raped by security forces in 2009. The women involved were too afraid to report the crime.
- One aid worker testified to meeting several Tamil females in Vavuniya Hospital who were impregnated following rapes by the army in the Manik Farm camp. Two of them were 12–13 years old, while the others were between 18 and 21. All had been threatened with death by the security forces to not tell anyone of their rapes.
- Another woman who was raped in the camp described witnessing a "very young beautiful girl", a trainee nun being abducted against her will by 10 army men at around 1pm. She was then returned in a dishevelled and traumatised state at 8pm, with clear signs of having been gang raped and tortured. She found it difficult to walk and had cigarette burns all over her body. She said that her "life was over" and remained mentally disturbed.
- Another young mother was taken from Manik farm to an Army camp. Both her and her toddler were stripped naked. When the toddler started screaming in terror, he was kicked along with his mother with army boots. She was then raped and tortured multiple times in front of her toddler for several weeks in a cell.
- Another woman was gang raped and beaten by two Sinhalese men. One of the men whilst ejaculating on her face said that "all LTTE and Tamils must die".
- In October 2009, UM, a 25 year old Tamil woman who had fled the final warzone in April 2009 was beaten and gang raped by soldiers. She recounts:

"They beat me, pulled my hair, and banged my head on a wall. They beat me with their hands and kicked me with their boots. One of the soldiers said, "We will teach you a lesson." I lost consciousness that day and when I came to, I realized I had been raped. Then more soldiers came and raped me. This went on for many days. I can't remember how many times and how many soldiers raped me."

- In September 2009, a Tamil man (27) from Mannar with no link to the LTTE was fishing with his father, before coming under shellfire by the Navy. Their boat was hit, and he was left with a broken leg. He regained consciousness in a Navy camp, where multiple Navy officers then anally raped him repeatedly.

He was detained in the camp for 10 months, and raped frequently before being sent home. He was then told to regularly report back to the camp, where he was raped each time. The Navy threatened to rape his fiancée if he did not come to the camp. Despite reporting regularly to the camp, his fiancée was still raped.

4 days before he escaped the country, the Navy found out about his plans to leave and abducted him. They tortured him and inserted a pipe into his rectum, before pushing barbed wire through it. They then removed the pipe, leaving the barbed wire in the rectum, before withdrawing and inserting it several times to cause serious trauma. The officers said to him:

"you are getting out, this is what you deserve."

In September 2012, he escaped Sri Lanka by boat to Australia. He was subsequently admitted into a mental hospital in Brisbane due to a deterioration in his mental state. Whilst there, a Tamil Gynaecologist provided him with numerous menstrual pads due to rectal bleeding. He was also examined by Brian Senewiratne, who confirmed multiple perforations of the rectum consistent with barbed wire insertion. Senewiratne further stated that 'the photograph of his ripped anus is too dreadful' to publish. He subsequently underwent surgery for his ripped anus and received psychiatric treatment. Despite this, he remains mentally disturbed.

- His fiancée (25) who became his wife also escaped the country due to the frequent rapes by the navy. Her medical report from the Mannar District General Hospital on 15 June 2013 confirmed the assaults:

"On examination there were multiple simple linear abrasions over lower and upper limbs and face. Both breasts showed multiple contusions and bite marks and were very tender. The genitalia showed the vulva to be oedematous (swollen). Both labia majora (the external female genitalia) were swollen. Speculum examination showed an active bleeding site about 3cm in the vaginal vault."

== 2010s ==
=== 2010 ===
- In January 2010, a Tamil asylum seeker was deported from Africa back to Sri Lanka. On arrival, he was detained and eventually taken to the Joseph camp in Vavuniya. During his detention he was stripped naked and sexually abused by soldiers. He was also hung upside down and frequently beaten with hot metal rods and batons.
- On 15 April 2010, PP, a Tamil woman (31) was deported from Africa back to Sri Lanka. On arrival, she was detained by security officers and beaten repeatedly with sand filled pipes and batons. She was repeatedly gang raped by 4-5 men in succession. She fainted during these gang rape sessions, and was unable to remember exactly how many times she was raped. When she regained consciousness, there was heavy bleeding from her vagina and injuries throughout her body.
- On 2 May 2010, Manimolly, an Indian Tamil woman living in Colombo, was arrested by Sri Lankan police and was beaten and gang raped in the early hours of the day by two drunk CID officers. She recounted:

"They were like animals. I was crying. At that time I was forty days pregnant and I started to bleed, having a miscarriage."

The policemen then threatened her with death if she dared tell anyone what had happened. They returned her to a cell with her blood stained trousers. In the cell there were two other Tamil girls who had been raped and were contemplating suicide.

- In 2010, a Catholic sister described the sexual harassment of Tamil girls by the Sri Lankan Army in the Vanni:

"In front of our own eyes, and inside our premises, the army was touching a young girl…so what would happen if we are also not there"

- Further accounts of sexual abuse by the Sri Lankan Army in 2010 include one lady raped in the newly resettled area of Alkataveli, Mannar District and another lady sexually abused in Nachikuda.
- On 6 June 2010, two internally displaced Tamil women who returned to their house in Vishvamadu, Kilinochchi, suffered sexual violence at the hands of Sri Lankan soldiers stationed at the Vishvamadu army camp. One 27-year-old mother of two was gang raped while the other 38-year-old mother of four was sexually assaulted. Four of the suspects identified by the victims were sentenced to 25 years of rigorous imprisonment for the gang rape by the Jaffna High Court in 2015 which characterized the crime as "unbearable and unforgivable". However, in 2019 Sri Lanka's Court of Appeal acquitted the four soldiers of all charges. The victim who had been repeatedly harassed and threatened by military and police sought refugee status overseas in fear for her safety.
- In May 2010, MT, a 30 year old Tamil mother was taken to a detention site in Vavuniya where she was tortured and raped by security forces.
- On 10 December 2010, a Tamil poet (29) was deported from Dubai to Sri Lanka. On arrival, he was taken into custody by security forces who repeatedly beat him on the head. He was then detained for over a month, and beaten up daily. During his detention, he was raped at least 4-5 times by two men who would take turns, whilst the other held him down. He was also tied down in a crucifix position and then burnt with hot metal rods all over his body. At times he was kicked in the head with metallic boots or poked with a hot poker.

=== 2011 ===
- In January 2011, a teenage student in the Vanni was raped by a Sri Lankan soldier as she went to cut firewood. She was 3 months pregnant in April 2011 as a result of the rape.
- On 27 March 2011, a Tamil witness narrated to the Lessons Learnt and Reconciliation Commission how her 10-year-old sister was raped by the Sri Lankan Army in Kalmunai during a round up. Her sister later became intellectually disabled. The witness also said that the army beat her severely, pricked nails to her hands, and sexually harassed her during the assault. She was then taken to a room and locked up. When she cried for water the army gave her urine instead.
- In April 2011, in Kilinochchi, a number of local Tamil women confirmed to Channel 4 News that the Sri Lankan Army had raped them. One woman described being sexually abused by 6-7 soldiers at one time. Human rights group further confirmed that Tamil women were vulnerable to continued sexual abuse by the army.
- In 2011, underage Tamil girls from the north were being forcibly trafficked to the south for prostitution. The racket was exposed by the National Child Protection Authority, when a 16-year-old girl from Mullaithivu had escaped to the police and recounted her story. Eight more girls between the ages of 16 and 24 were discovered in the brothel in Maradana being used as prostitutes against their will. This included an 18-year-old who had been displaced in the final stages of the war and had initially lived in an internment camp in Vavuniya. A national hospital doctor and midwife were involved in the racket by providing contraceptives and abortions for the girls.
- In August 2011, local Tamils in the Jaffna District clashed with the Sri Lankan military, after they accused the army of sheltering 'grease devil' sex offenders aligned with the army. Two military vehicles were smashed in a protest, which led to mass arrests of over 102 Tamil men by the Sri Lankan police.
- In August 2011, several Tamil women in the north confirmed to journalists that the Sri Lankan Army had raped them, including one woman who said that several soldiers had held her down and gang raped her.
- In August 2011, a 31-year-old Tamil man was abducted in a white van by security officers in Vavuniya. He was then severely tortured and raped multiple times for 10 days by both army officials and prison guards. He recounted one instance as follows:

"During the first interrogation, the official in military fatigues forced me to undress. He tried to have oral sex with me. He forced himself on me and raped me. During questioning, the officials would squeeze my penis. They would force me to masturbate them. One of them masturbated me. I was severely tortured when I resisted. The officials would furiously say some words in Sinhala when they sexually abused me."

- In October 2011, Tamil MP M. A. Sumanthiran tabled a report in parliament on the ground situation in the North and East of Sri Lanka. The report confirmed that Tamil women and girls were being raped and molested with impunity by the security forces, but also by Sinhala construction workers from the south. The report further states:

"The labour force generally stays near the site next to the (Tamil) villages and has proven to be a threat of molestation and harassment to local (Tamil) women and girls. Reports also indicate that when such complaints of harassment and molestation are made the complainants are often threatened and sometimes abused by the military personnel concerned. There are also reports of complaints to the police being generally met with inaction when the alleged perpetrators are either security forces or labourers or workmen from the South."

- In November 2011, GD, a 31 year old Tamil woman was taken from her house in Dehiwala to the 4th floor of the CID headquarters for interrogation. She was then raped and tortured by her interrogators including by a uniformed police officer.

=== 2012 ===
- On 3 March 2012 in Delft, Kandasamy Jegatheeswaran, member of the pro-government paramilitary EPDP who had prior history of sexually assaulting Tamil minors, abducted and raped a 12-year-old Tamil girl and murdered her by crushing her head with a rock.
- In April 2012, a 29 year old Tamil man was arrested by the Sri Lankan Police in Vavuniya after returning from aboard. He was accused of being a LTTE member and subsequently raped by different officers for three nights. He also suffered cigarette burns, beatings with various objects and was suspended from the ceiling.
- In April 2012, SA, a 42 year old Tamil political activist was abducted by drunk men armed with T56 rifles. They blindfolded him and then sexually assaulted him in order to humiliate him. He was also repeatedly beaten before being released.
- In April 2012, a Tamil woman was detained by the Sri Lankan police and subjected to regular rapes and torture. On one occasion whilst being raped, another police officer physically assaulted her. Everyday during her detention, she would hear other male and female detainees crying and screaming out in pain.
- The pro-rebel TamilNet reported in August 2012 that the Sri Lankan Army were routinely subjecting former LTTE female cadres to repeated and prolonged sexual abuse. In many cases with the motive to impregnate them by Sinhalese soldiers, either in detention or through later 'summoning' post release. When the women refuse to cooperate with the 'summons', their relatives are often harmed.
- A senior Tamil doctor in the North confirmed the widespread nature of the abuse saying: "I don't know what to do with most of the cases. There is no international system to protect them in the island or provide refuge outside." One abused woman that had recently come to him was eight months pregnant. She was subsequently handed over to the care of some nuns.
- The doctors' accounts were also confirmed by a social worker working on gender related issues in the island, who said that the rapes were committed at two stages, first in the internment camps, second during the 'summons' after release. 'Summoning' former female cadres for interrogation and then repeatedly raping them has become a routine past time in Sri Lankan Army camps throughout Jaffna and Vanni.
- The same report also recounts an incident in Jaffna, where a young ex-cadre from Vanni wanted to hand over her 13 month old baby to anyone who would take care of it. The child was a result of multiple rapes at the hands of the 'interrogating' Sri Lankan Army but she wanted the child to live.
- TamilNet former war correspondent Mr. A. Lokeesan said that at the end of the war, young Sinhala soldiers of the Sri Lankan Army were given pornographic material to encourage them to rape captured female LTTE cadres.
- In August 2012, TJ, a 19 year old Tamil male who had recently returned to Sri Lanka after studying in the UK was abducted by a white van in Vavuniya. He was blindfolded and taken to an unknown site, where he was questioned by the army about his links with the LTTE abroad. He was burned with cigarettes, beaten with batons and drowned in a barrel of water. The next night a person entered his room, banged his head against the wall and then raped him, while saying some words in Sinhala.
- In August 2012, DK, a 21 year old Tamil male was returning home in Vavuniya when a white van abducted him. He was blindfolded and taken to an unknown site. They then removed his blindfold in a dirty room with a floor covered with dried blood. He could hear screams coming from another room. Eventually, his interrogators started beating him with batons and put a petrol infused plastic bag over his head to asphyxiate him. He also was burned with cigarettes. At night, a man would come to beat and rape him. This happened for 4-5 consecutive nights.
- In September 2012, JH, a 23 year old Tamil male who had recently returned to Sri Lanka after studying in the UK was abducted by a white van in Colombo. He was blindfolded and taken to an unknown site, where he was questioned about his travel abroad and his links to the LTTE. He was then stripped naked and beaten. He was then beaten with electric wires and burned with cigarettes. Finally he was anally raped by three men on three consecutive nights.
- In September 2012, KM, a 22 year old Tamil male who had recently returned to Sri Lanka after studying in the UK was abducted by a light coloured van in Batticaloa market. He was blindfolded and taken to an unknown site, where he was questioned about his travel abroad and his links to the LTTE. He was burned with cigarettes, hung upside down and drowned in a barrel of water. He was raped four times at night during his detention by Sinhala-speaking men.
- A Tamil woman (24) was gang raped by government forces in late 2012 in Trincomalee. 5 men had dragged her from her home as her mother watched. They blind folded her and took her to a secret location where she could hear the screams and cries of other detainees. When they removed her blindfolds she saw two men with neat shirts and crew cuts who interrogated her in broken Tamil. During her detainment, the two men gang raped her and left cigarette burns on her face, breasts and arms. She bled for days after the rape, lying on the floor without food and water. She could not sleep as her "body burned with pain and shame", and she was waiting to "just die".
- In 2012, a Tamil woman called 'SJ' was tortured and raped by security forces. She was beat and trampled upon with boots, and suffocated with a petrol filled bag over her head. She was then gang raped by two men and burnt with cigarettes on her back and legs.
- In 2012, a Tamil man called 'VV' was tortured and raped by security forces. He was tied to a table and beat with cables leaving large permanent scars on his back. He was then raped for three consecutive days.
- Several former LTTE cadres who were working at garment factories as part of the government's 'rehabilitation' programme were raped by the managers at the factory. Several of them would also be picked up by the security forces from the hostels where they were staying to be sexually assaulted.
- In 2012, both Saroja Sivachandran, the president of the Women's Development Centre in Jaffna, and C. V. K. Sivagnanam, the president of the NGOs in Jaffna confirmed that there were several cases of the army raping Tamil women throughout the north. However, the victims were too scared to testify against the army. Sivachandran explained: "If the people do not come forward, we cannot prove it. We cannot do our jobs."

=== 2013 ===
- Tamil women in the north reported continuing sexual abuse by the army in 2013. Activists reported cases of rape of Tamil women by the army, but said that in all cases the victims were too scared to report to the police. One Tamil woman in Mannar described the fear regarding the rapes as follows:

"I have a terrible fear when I hear the word "army". We always feel under threat. We are afraid even to talk about it."

- In February 2013, Human Rights Watch examined medical reports which confirmed evidence of sexual violence against Tamils by security forces. The report documented in detail 75 cases of rape. Many of the reports documented bite marks on the breasts and buttocks, as well as cigarette burns. Two men also had sharp needles inserted into their penis. The needles were used by the Sri Lankan army to insert small metal balls into the urethra. The metal balls were later removed by surgeons abroad.
- In March 2013, a Tamil man called Kumar was abducted in a white van along with his brother by the army. He was accused of having LTTE links which he denied. He was then raped repeatedly and tortured. On the 4th day of detainment, he was branded on the back with hot irons, leaving criss cross burn marks.
- In May 2013, a 7-year-old girl was raped, punched and her ears and mouth were bitten while on her way back from school in Nedunkerny, Vavuniya. A Sri Lankan Army soldier attached to the Army camp in Kanakarayankulam who had been involved in a similar incident previously was taken into custody by the police. The suspect was then enlarged on bail and the case has not had any further progress.
- In October 2013, a Buddhist monk called Kalyanatissa Thero was arrested for sexually abusing a 9-year-old boy at the Sethsevana Children's Home in Attambagaskanda, Vavuniya, which housed war-affected Tamil children. The child complained of pain during urination and was admitted to Vavuniya Hospital where his extensive sexual abuse was revealed. The monk had threatened the child's mother, stating that the Army, Police and CID were "all on his side". He was later granted a non-conditional bail on the recommendation of the Attorney General Department.
- On 29 October 2013, a Tamil woman called Maithili Amirthalingam (27) was raped and murdered in Puthur, Valikamam East, Jaffna District. Her corpse was later found in a well near her home. Despite medical officers confirming that the victim had been raped and murdered, the Sri Lankan Police ignored the evidence and asserted that the victim had died merely from drowning. The police manipulated the evidence to avoid making arrests of members of the security forces.
- In 2013, 12 rapes of Tamils by the security forces were documented by journalist Frances Harrison. One lady called Vasantha recounted the following experience after being abducted and detained by security forces:

"When the lady left and that man closed the door, I knew what was going to happen. They raped me."

Vasantha further recounted hearing the screams of other Tamil females from her confinement. She was tortured before being repeatedly raped by Sri Lankan soldiers for 20 days. The torture involved being beaten with pipes and batons, being submerged in water to simulate drowning, being burned with cigarettes, and being suffocated with a petrol filled bag over her head. She was then left naked in a dirty cell for 3 days, with her skin itching badly.

- Another female victim, Nandini reported being abducted by 5-6 army men in 2013 before being gang raped repeatedly by Sri Lankan soldiers one after another, from night to day.
- Another victim Ravi, a former LTTE conscript, was sent to 'rehabilitation' camps at the end of the war. He was in these camps for 4 years where he faced constant torture and sexual abuse. He recounted:

"They would put my testicles in the drawer and slam the drawer shut. Sometimes I became unconscious. Then they would bring someone and force me to have oral sex with him. Sometimes if we lost consciousness during the torture they would urinate on us,"

- Another male victim Siva, described being tortured by security forces who anally inserted a S-lon pipe filled with barbed wire into his rectum. The pipe was then removed leaving the barbed wire inside, which was subsequently pulled out causing permanent damage. Doctors later confirmed that he would never fully recover from his injuries.
- In 2013, Alison Callaway, a medical doctor working for the charity 'Freedom from Torture' confirmed that they had examined 120 separate incidents of Tamils being tortured in the post-war period. In the last 5 years, she had personally written 200 independent assessments for Tamil torture victims. She concluded the following:

"There is such a systematic set-up in Sri Lanka, whereby it's absolutely clear to me… that detention and torture is going on in a very large scale and that it's done in a very similar way every time."

- In 2013, 'SP', a local community organiser who researches sexual violence confirmed that other female activists who documented rapes had sometimes been sexually assaulted themselves by the army as punishment. She further stated that in 2013, government forces were abducting and raping Tamil females for many days before sending them home blindfolded.
- In another case documented by SP, a Tamil woman received a letter saying that her 'disappeared' husband was being held in a jail close to her village. She followed the letters instructions which told her to meet with people who claimed to have knowledge of her husband's whereabouts. However, it was a trap and she was abducted by men and gang raped for hours. She later reported the incident to the police who just laughed at her.
- SP further said that the 'grease devils' were army men who put grease on their face to hide their identities before they assault women at night, often raping them and biting on their breasts.
- In a late 2013 interview with Al Jazeera, a government official working with Tamil rape victims highlighted the case of a widow and mother of two living in an isolated village who wanted to terminate her unwanted pregnancy that resulted from repeated rapes by Sri Lankan Army soldiers, and stated that every month he received one or two similar cases from the backward areas of Kilinochchi and Mullaitivu.

=== 2014 ===
- In March 2014, the International Truth and Justice Project (ITJP) published a report on torture and sexual violence in the post-war Sri Lanka involving 40 cases of Tamil victims whose families managed to secure their release by paying a bribe, with more than half dating from 2013 to February 2014. Nearly half of the victims attempted suicide after having fled to the UK. The report described the abuses against Tamils by the Sri Lankan security forces as "widespread and systematic" and as occurring in a manner indicative of "a coordinated, systematic plan approved by the highest levels of government." Arguing that the abuses amounted to crimes against humanity, the ITJP called upon the UN Security Council to refer its report to the Prosecutor of the International Criminal Court for further action. The victims were also subjected to racist verbal abuse, such as being taunted as "Tamil slave" and "Tamil dog" whilst being raped. One victim was told that "Tamil mouths were only good for oral sex," and another was told to tell her whole Tamil generation that "you people should never think of forming another LTTE, you people are slaves and you should remain slaves." One woman who had been gang raped and tortured stated, "they want to destroy us and our race. They want us to be their slaves." Another woman after being raped, was threatened by her rapist: "If you tell anyone what happened here I will shoot your whole family".
- In 2014, a Tamil man called 'John' recounted being gang raped by the Navy in a Navy base in Mannar, under the directive of Gotabaya Rajapaksa, the defence secretary and future president. He was first raped by a Navy commander who then ordered his subordinates to continue the raping:

"Make sure you do a good job. Our boss Gota told us not to spare them. Make sure that this man is brought back tomorrow since there will be two other Officers who will 'want to have a go.' "

- In July 2014, a child rape case involving the Sri Lankan Navy in Karainagar received significant media attention. It was reported that 7 sailors attached to the Karainagar Navy base off the coast of Jaffna peninsula abducted two Tamil girls aged 11 and 9 on their way to school in the mornings, gang raped them in an abandoned building and released them in the afternoons for 11 consecutive days. Alerted by the school on their child's absence, the parents of the 11-year-old discovered their bleeding child in mentally disturbed condition on 16 July 2014. The children were admitted to the Jaffna Teaching Hospital, where a medical examination by the Judicial Medical Officer (JMO) established that the 11-year-old had suffered repeated vaginal penetration and the 9-year-old severe sexual abuse. On 18 July, the Kayts police arrested 7 naval personnel attached to the Poorikalabhoomi Navy detachment and then released them on bail after the 11-year-old victim had failed to identify her attackers. The child was believed to have acted under stress and in fear as the Sri Lankan Navy had threatened her family not to identify the perpetrators. The case was repeatedly postponed by the court, with some sources alleging interference from those close to the then Defence Secretary Gotabaya Rajapaksa and the then President Mahinda Rajapaksa. The case also attracted protests from the locals and women groups in Jaffna, who demanded the Sri Lankan military to end their intimidation and harassment of victims and the occupation of the Tamil areas.
- In July 2015, the International Truth and Justice Project (ITJP) released a report documenting a further 180 cases of rape and torture by the Sri Lankan security forces which occurred in the post war period from May 2009 - July 2015. It described the security forces of operating "a policy of systematic and widespread arbitrary detention, torture, rape and sexual violence, 6 years after the end of the civil war".
- One victim tortured in 2014, described how a 2-inch diameter plastic pipe was forced in and out of his anus 2-3 times by the security forces. They then forced a sharp ended wire of 1/4 inch diameter into his penis making him scream in pain. Another witness described being painfully anally raped by an officer, before he withdrew and ejaculated over his face. Another witness described having barbed wire inserted into his anus and being made to give oral sex to a circle of torturers one by one til they all ejaculated in his mouth. The circle of torturers would then take turns to anally rape him.
- Another of the male witnesses who was raped in 2014 tried to hide from the army. His wife was then detained by the security forces who also gang raped and tortured her. They left her with "multiple scratch marks and bite marks on her hands, breasts, arms, shoulders and back". Some of her wounds were also bleeding. Following the change of government in January 2015, she was yet again called back to the army camp.
- Family members of the victims documented in the report were also frequently persecuted by the security forces. In one case, the victim's father was beaten to death after she had already been detained and raped. Her remaining relatives (mother and brother) were then killed for refusing to tell them where she was hiding. Following this, she was yet again detained and raped.
- Another woman described being detained in a room with several underage teenagers. They were all kept naked with their hands and feet bound together. Several times a day one of the teenagers would be taken out to be raped by the security forces. The woman also described being raped multiple times herself.
- Another woman reported being subjected to 6-7 gang rape sessions in the Joseph camp in Vavuniya. The army men would rape her orally, vaginally and anally, often at the same time. On one occasion they also put a baton in her vagina.

=== 2015 ===
- In April 2015, journalist Trevor Grant reported that Tamil women from Sri Lanka were being raped and sexually assaulted by Indian security guards and intelligence police in squalid refugee camps in Tamil Nadu. In one case six widows and young single women were used as sex slaves by the Indian security police for more than 6 months in the Chengalpattu special camp. The refugees reported that sex slavery had been occurring for years.

In 2010, Kumar Pathmathevi (28) a refugee from a camp in Karur district committed self-immolation after being raped by three policemen. In 2015, the naked dead body of a Tamil female refugee was found outside the Madurai camp. Police confirmed that she had been raped. A driver for a local mafia gang confirmed that "refugee women were being used as sex slaves all the time".

Tamil refugees who arrived with any bodily injuries were assumed to be former Tamil Tigers and taken to the Chengalpattu special camp. One inmate said she knew of three women who were sexually tortured at this camp. When they were returned from the special camp they demonstrated signs of mental illness. She further recounted:

"Their minds are dead. They don't even know how to ask for food. Some of us feel sorry for them. We take food to them. We are scared when we do it. If the security guards see us, they say 'Do you want to sleep with us as well?' Those men still visit them to satisfy their sexual needs. They hold their hair and hit them. When I look at this I can't stand it. When our children are out, they come to us and say 'come and sleep with us or we will claim you're a Tamil Tiger'."

- In August 2015, Freedom from Torture documented the widespread use of torture by Sri Lankan security forces against Tamils in the post-war period (after May 2009). The following findings were documented:
  - More than 70% of the 148 Tamil torture victims they examined had been sexually tortured.
  - Forms of sexual torture included rape (anal, vaginal, oral and instrumental), sexual molestation, beatings to the genitals and victims being forced to rape each other.
  - Prevalence of sexual torture was even higher among the female victims, with 22/23 disclosing some form of sexual torture.
  - Many victims reported being raped by multiple perpetrators at multiple different times.
  - Women were often raped repeatedly, night by night by different officers either in their cells, or in interrogation rooms.
  - In a few cases, female officers would accompany the male officers and take part in the sexual humiliation and molestation of Tamil women.
  - Female victims described being raped both vaginally and anally, often at the same time, as well as being raped with glass bottles and batons.
  - Female victims also had their breasts burnt, bitten, beaten or scratched, as well as having other body parts being stabbed or cut.
- The following accounts of rape of Tamil women were documented in the same report:

"... She was taken by a guard at night to a 'questioning room' where several male uniformed officers were waiting, faces partially obscured. They sexually molested, bound and blindfolded her, drugged her, then each raped her in turn."

"... During the night army men came into her cell. One man stood watching at the door while the other raped her, and then they swapped so that the second man raped her too. The next night other men came to her cell. These men raped her vaginally and then anally. On both nights she recalls that the men had been drinking alcohol. On the second night she remembers one man holding her legs down and another burning her with cigarettes. She was bitten by her assailants and scratched with their nails."

- The same report documented the following forms of sexual torture against Tamil men:
  - One man described how a plastic pipe was inserted into his rectum whilst he was suspended. Barbed wire was then pushed through the pipe, and the pipe was subsequently pulled out leaving the barbed wire in the rectum. This occurred repeatedly.
  - Another man was blindfolded, bound and forced onto his knees. He then had a glass bottle inserted into his rectum for 10 minutes causing him severe pain.
  - Some men were urinated or ejaculated on, or forced to swallow semen or urine.
  - Genitals were often beaten or burned, leaving permanent damage.
- The following account of rape of a Tamil man was also documented:

"... In the afternoon two men came into the room. Both men took it in turns to make him take their penis in his mouth and then took it in turns to anally rape him. Throughout this time they were swearing at him and calling him filthy names. They held a gun to his head some of the time and also hit him with the handle of the gun. After he had been raped several times he was left alone in the room with no clothes on. He was kept naked for the rest of the time until he was released."

- The following accounts of sexual torture against Tamil men were documented in the same report:

"... He was ordered to remove all his clothes, and was interrogated and beaten for several hours. During this time a length of twine was twisted around his penis, causing excruciating pain."

"... His penis was crushed in a drawer that was slowly closed in order to induce a confession. They were laughing when they were inflicting the injury."

"...With his hands tied a two inch nail was forced into his urethra and rotated causing pain, some bleeding and discomfort on passing urine for many days."

- The International Truth and Justice Project (ITJP) recorded 20 cases of rape against Tamils committed by the security forces in 2015. Witness 142, a Tamil male, described the rapes as follows:

"He forced his penis in my mouth and moved it in and out like masturbating and ejaculated all over my face and left. The guard kicked the metal door all night and kept yelling ‘Kotiya’. This same conduct occurred every night thereafter. The two guards anally raped me on every occasion they abused me, which was every day."

- The report also described female soldiers preparing Tamil victims for rape by undressing them for the male soldiers, as witness 159 recounts:

"Later that night an army woman came...She removed my clothes. I was crying. They were looking at my body and laughing at me saying things in Sinhalese. I was trying to push the woman away and she said "oossh, oossh" and started slapping me…the woman said something to the man and she left the room. He came up to me and tried to pull my bra and panties off…He grabbed my hair and was slapping me and saying something in Sinhalese…I remember laying on the floor on my back and in a daze trying to get up but being held down by hands on my arms pinning them to the floor."

=== 2017 ===
- In 2017, human rights groups confirmed that Sri Lankan security forces were still raping and torturing scores of Tamils. In one report, 50 Tamil men had been raped by security forces after being abducted and detained. Some had been raped with sticks wrapped in barbed wire. Almost all victims were branded and scarred from their torture. One man recounted being raped 12 times during his 3-week detention. He was also hit with iron rods, hung upside down, and suffered cigarette burns.

Piers Pigou, a human rights investigator with over 40 years experience of interviewing torture survivors, said:

"The levels of sexual abuse being perpetuated in Sri Lanka by authorities are the most egregious and perverted that I've ever seen."

Another Tamil victim recounted the following torture:

"They heated up iron rods and burned my back with stripes. On another occasion, they put chili powder in a bag and put the bag over my head until I passed out. They … raped me."

Ann Hannah, from 'Freedom from Torture', confirmed that these claims were consistent with what their organization had documented in the last 5 years. She further stated that Sri Lanka was by far the leading source for torture referrals to her organization. She said:

"The number of referrals we're seeing is not dropping off since the conflict. Political rhetoric about Sri Lanka being a different place, and EU trade relations being re-established due to improvements in the human rights situation, is not consistent with what we're seeing."

- In 2017, the UCLA School of Law: Health and Human Rights Project ran the 'All Survivors Project' for male war victims of sexual abuse. They identified the following common forms of abuse by Sri Lankan security forces:
  - the electrocution or beating of genitals.
  - the burning of genitals with cigarettes or heated metal.
  - the insertion of pins, metal wire, or tiny metal balls into the urethra of the penis.
  - Slamming a drawer shut on the victim's testicles or penis.
  - Applying twisting pressure to the penis or testicles manually or with a string tied around it.
  - Enforced nudity.
  - anal penetration with chili coated sticks.
  - Forced masturbation.
  - Ejaculation in the victim's mouth or on their body.
  - Forced oral masturbation.
  - Forced swallowing of the perpetrator's urine or semen.
  - Anal rape over several days by multiple perpetrators.
  - Forcing victims to anally rape each other.
  - Insertion of bottles, poles and batons into the anus or mouth.
  - Insertion of a hollow tube into the anus, followed by the pushing of barbed wire through it.

=== 2019 ===
- In 2019, a Tamil male was detained and tortured for the second time since 2011 when he was just a teenager. He was subjected to rapes, sexual torture and severe beatings with batons and pipes that left scars all over his body.
- In January 2019, a Tamil male was detained by CID officers for attending a ceremony to remember disappeared Tamils. For 15 days he was repeatedly beaten, tortured, branded with hot metal bars and sexually abused after he refused to become an informer. He was forced to sign a false confession and was released after his family paid a bribe. The torture left him with deep physical scars and hearing loss.
- In 2019, the Torture Journal published the story of Jaya, a middle aged Tamil mother and LTTE conscript raped by security forces on multiple occasions. She recounted one occasion when the Sinhalese men pulled her hair and shoved her up against a bench. They then pushed a 10 inch long, wrist-wide iron pestle into her vagina and caused her severe pain. They also used derogatory Sinhala words against her during the gang rape, calling her a 'kotti' (tiger) and 'utti' (cunt). Three men would all take turns to rape her, while one of the men held her down.

== 2020s ==
=== 2020 ===
- The pro-rebel TamilNet reported in May 2020 that the Sri Lankan Army's 231 Brigade were sexually abusing Tamil women in Kalladi (Batticaloa). Local Tamil community leaders complained that the abuse was increasing, and that Tamil women were being taken to the military quarters at night and abused by more than 2–3 soldiers in one night.
- The majority of Tamil women working in garment factories in the Sinhala majority south face molestation and sexual abuse from their supervisors. One Tamil woman from Jaffna committed suicide after being raped by her supervisor in 2020. Activists estimate that 90% of factory workers are molested at least once during their time in the factory.
- In 2020, young Tamil activists who were involved in collecting details about the thousands of Tamils abducted and disappeared by security forces were abducted, tortured and raped themselves. Many of these new victims had siblings themselves who had earlier disappeared during the war. The 'International Truth and Justice Project' recounted their harrowing experiences:

"In detention they experienced brutal torture at the hands of the security forces, such as whipping of the soles of the feet, blows to sexual organs, cigarette burns, branding with a heated metal rod, water torture, asphyxiation, suspension in stress positions, mock executions and death threats, as well as rape, including gang rape."

=== 2021 ===
- On 2 January 2021, Sri Lankan police officers who had come to a Tamil house looking for a shopkeeper detained his daughter for questioning about her father's support for other Tamils. For five days she was beaten, tortured, and repeatedly raped and sexually abused by CID officers before being released after her family paid a bribe.
- In September 2021, the 'International Truth and Justice Project' reported that Tamils were still being raped and tortured by Sri Lankan security forces. Most of the victims were civilians and not former LTTE cadres. They were targeted for taking part in peaceful activities such as protests.
- Victims were "brutally beaten in detention, burned with hot metal rods, asphyxiated with petrol-soaked polythene bags, half drowned and then gang raped by the security forces." They were then left bleeding and naked on the floor with only their underwear to wipe the blood and semen off themselves.
- Of the 15 victims documented in the report, all had been raped whilst being racially abused as Tamils. One army torturer told one victim:

"You Tamil dog, you are an arrogant Tamil dog, whatever we do to you, no one is going to ask about it."

The Army man then forced his penis in the victim's mouth.

- Another victim was filmed whilst being raped by the security forces.
- Two victims also reported being anally raped with a metal rod by the security forces.

=== 2022 ===
- In May 2024, the 'International Truth and Justice Project' reported that Tamils were still being raped and tortured by Sri Lankan security forces between 2015 and 2022. 91 out of 139 Tamil detainees surveyed (including 16 out of the 24 detained in 2022) were subject to sexual violence. The most common forms being vaginal or anal rape, either penile or with a rod. Half of the detainees had no association with the LTTE, and were interrogated about their involvement in peaceful Tamil protests and memorials.

=== 2023 ===
- In March 2024, the UN High Commissioner for Human Rights expressed deep concern about the "recurring, credible accounts" received by his office of "abductions, unlawful detention and torture, including sexual violence" committed by the security forces in the north and east of Sri Lanka. Some of the cases were alleged to have taken place as late as 2023.

=== 2024 ===
- In August 2024, the Office of the United Nations High Commissioner for Human Rights (OHCHR) reported on how Tamils involved in protests were being tortured and sexually abused by security forces as late as January 2024. Many of the victims experienced rape, the squeezing of testicles, the biting of breasts and forced nudity at the hands of the security forces.

=== 2026 ===
- In the report published in January 2026, OHCHR documented confirmed cases of sexual violence used primarily by state security forces in detention settings during both conflict and post-conflict periods; consisting of a range of incidents including opportunistic, transactional, and institutionalized acts. OHCHR noted that these acts largely targeted Tamil civilians and individuals suspected of actual or perceived LTTE affiliation, including women and characterized them as deliberately intended to cause lasting psychological harm, with some acts potentially amounting to crimes against humanity. These violations were often committed with impunity and used strategically to extract information, assert dominance, and instill fear within Tamil communities.
- Survivors cited by OHCHR described symbols of military presence, such as camps and monuments in civilian areas, as reminders of past abuses and sources of ongoing harassment, including gender-based violence. Some survivors recounted experiences in the justice system, such as being required to display evidence like torn undergarments in open court, which they likened to re-victimization. Advocacy groups noted that many survivors avoided formal justice processes due to these ordeals.
- Specific survivor testimonies included descriptions of acts such as cutting off men's genitals and placing them in women's mouths, chopping women's bodies into pieces, and inserting sharp blades or rods into women's bodies. One female survivor stated she was treated "worse than an animal," while another noted that metal parts were later removed from a woman's body following such assaults. These acts reportedly contributed to the destruction of social structures, leading to broken families, broken relationships, collective grief, unresolved trauma, and increased mental health issues within affected communities. Survivors observed that "nobody is doing ok" and that "people are not happy," with some communities experiencing a prevalence of "crazy people" as a result of the violence.
- OHCHR noted these acts occurred in homes, at checkpoints, and in detention centers throughout various phases of the conflict. OHCHR also stated that these accounts were corroborated by consistent patterns observed across multiple testimonies across locations, and time periods, suggesting these were not isolated events, but part of a broader strategy involving domination, control, mutilation, exposure, and public degradation aimed at inflicting lasting trauma on individuals and communities.
- The report recommended that the international community consider the use of available legal mechanisms, including principles of universal and extraterritorial jurisdiction, to investigate and prosecute individuals credibly implicated in such violations.
- In a May 2026 report, Amnesty International noted that Indian Tamil workers in the tea estates endured sexual abuse along with economic exploitation and racial discrimination from Sinhalese estate owners and supervisors.

== Documentaries ==
- Men Report Rape, Torture Under Sri Lankan Govt.
- Sri Lanka: Rape of Tamil Detainees
- 'Tamils still being raped and tortured' in Sri Lanka
- The Body of Evidence: Testimonies from the Dark

== See also ==
- List of attacks on civilians attributed to Sri Lankan government forces
