= Pungudutivu =

Pungudutivu புங்குடுதீவு පුන්ගුඩුතිව්
- Island
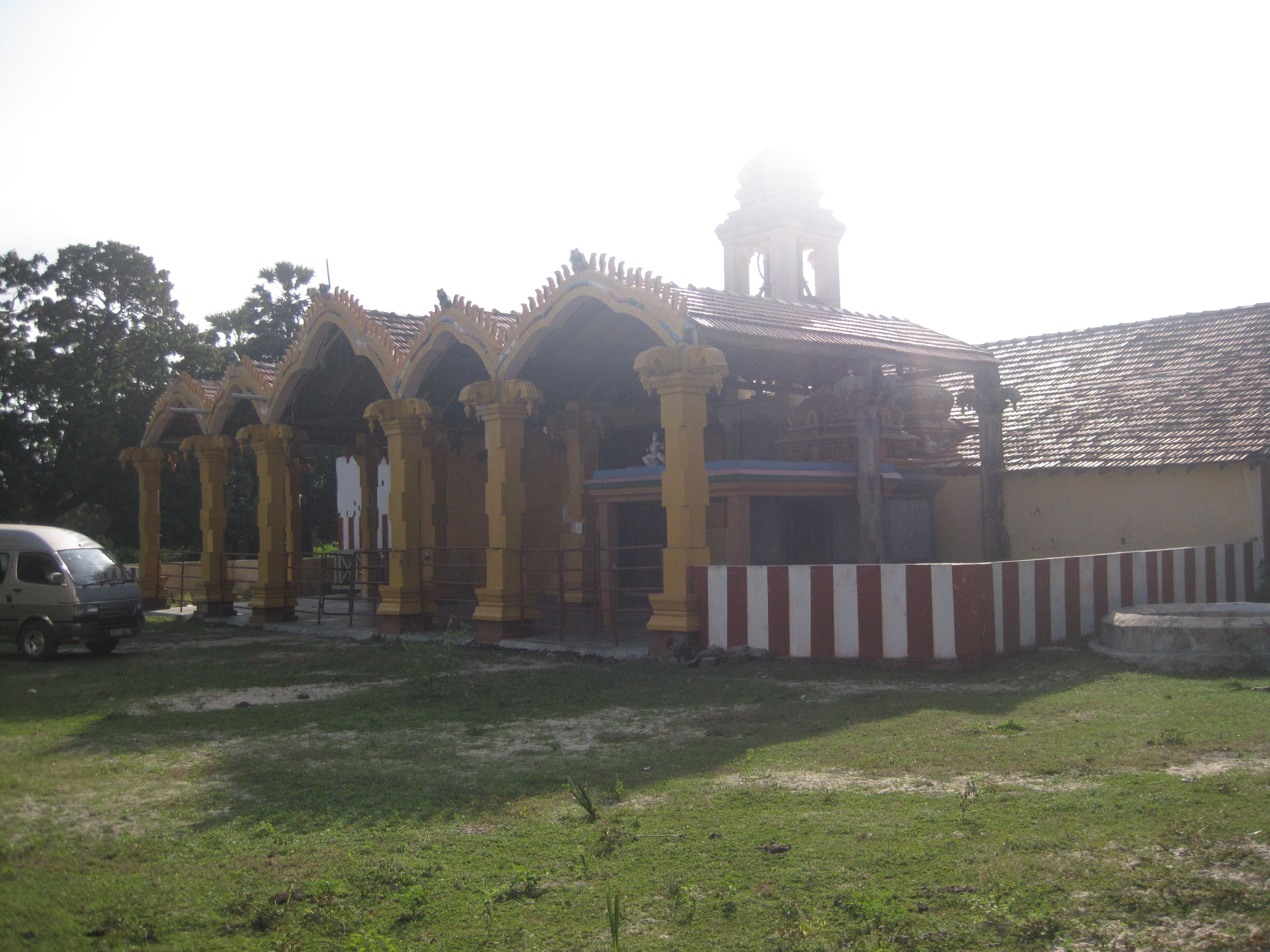
- Hindu Temple, Pungudutheevu

- Location within Northern Province
- Coordinates: 9°36′0″N 79°50′0″E
- Country: Sri Lanka
- Province: Northern
- District: Jaffna
- DS Division: Islands South

Pungudutivu or Pungai Idu Tivu (Tamil: புங்குடுதீவு Sinhala: පුන්ගුඩුතිව්) is a small island to the west of the Jaffna Peninsula in Sri Lankan Tamil dominated Northern Province. It is divided into 12 wards internally, each corresponding a major settlement.

Schools, government hospitals and some private clinics are also available. Pungudutivu is connected by road with mainland Jaffna. SLTB and private buses travel through the island along the Jaffna - Kurikadduwan route. Boats leave from Kurikadduwan to reach the islands of Nainativu and Needunthivu.

== History ==
Present Pungudutive has been identified with ancient Puvangu Divaina (the Island of Puvangu). This island is referred to in the 12th-century Rameswaram Sinhala inscription of King Nissankamalla (1187-1196 A.D.) as "Puvagu Divaina". The Nampota, an ancient Sinhala text written after the 14th century mentions this island as Puvangu Divaina which means the Island of Puvangu.

The island was named as Middleburg by the Dutch colonial rulers during their occupation of then Ceylon.

Most of the residents of the island are Tamils with majority being Hindus and a minority of Christians. There are a lot of Hindu temples in this region along with some Christian churches.

== Sri Lankan Civil War ==
It has been the subject and victim of wartime sexual violence by members of the Sri Lankan Navy who used sexual violence as a means of war during the Sri Lankan Civil War. Prominent cases include Sarathambal and Ilayathambi Tharsini. The civil war has also led a large number of people to migrate out of the Island throughout the world.
