= Krishanti Kumaraswamy =

Sri Lankan murder victim (born 1977)

Krishanti Kumaraswamy கிருஷாந்தி குமாரசுவாமி
- Krishanti Kumaraswamy
- Born: 1977; Jaffna, Sri Lanka
- Died: 7 September 1996 (aged 18–19); Jaffna, Sri Lanka
- Education: Chundikuli Girls High School
- Occupation: Student
- Parent(s): Rassammah and Kumaraswamy

Krishanti Kumaraswamy (Tamil: கிருஷாந்தி குமாரசுவாமி), also spelled Krishanthi Kumaraswamy, was a Tamil schoolgirl in Jaffna, Sri Lanka who was raped and murdered on 7 September 1996 by six Sri Lankan Army soldiers. The effort to bring her assailants to justice became a cause célèbre as a part of the protest against atrocities committed by the Sri Lankan Army during the Sri Lankan civil war.

== Background ==
Krishanti Kumaraswamy was a student of Chundikuli Girls High School, studying GCE Advanced Level, after passing the Ordinary Level exam with seven distinctions. Her mother Rasamma, was the principal of Kaithady Maha Vithyalayam. Her father had died in 1984. Her elder sister Prashanthi was studying in Colombo. Pranavan, her younger brother, was a student of St. John's College, Jaffna had given his G.C.E (O/L) exams. Her family lived in Kaithady.

== Incident ==
On 7 September 1996, Krishanti Kumaraswamy went missing on her way home after GCE Advanced Level chemistry examination at Chundikuli Girls High School. She was last seen alive at 11:30 am at Kaithady Army checkpoint in Jaffna as she used to cross the checkpoint daily while returning from school. She had been detained while cycling back home which passerby saw and informed her mother.

Her mother Rassammah, brother Pranavan (age 16), and family friend Kirupakaran (age 35) became concerned and went in search of Krishanti. They were also murdered. Amnesty International issued an Urgent Action Appeal (UA 222/96) on 20 September for her.

According to pro-rebel Tamilnet, forty five days later, the bodies of the four were later found in shallow graves within the army base. A three quarter width rope was found tied round the neck of Rassammah’s corpse. Kirupakaran too appeared to have been strangled in the same manner since the rope was wound tightly round his body. The bodies of Krishanti and her brother Pranavan were cut in several pieces and haphazardly wrapped in black colored sheets.

Later investigations revealed that she was abducted by five soldiers and another six gang raped and killed her at the checkpoint.

== Government investigation ==
Amnesty International and other human rights organizations like Women for Peace launched a sustained campaign to pressure the Sri Lankan government to arrest and prosecute the soldiers. Six soldiers who were directly involved in the raping were sentenced to death by the court of the government of Sri Lanka.

In the court case about her rape and murder one of the accused informed the state about an alleged mass grave known as Chemmani mass graves that was investigated to contain 15 bodies.

Lance Corporal R. Dewage Somaratne Rajapaksa, a Sri Lankan soldier, was sentenced to death for the gang-rape and murder of Krishanti Kumaraswamy and three others. He is currently in prison.

== Related to incident ==
According to pro-rebel Tamilnet, a local activist who worked to expose her case was killed by unknown gunmen on 1 February 2007. Her death anniversary is remembered in Chemmani and Jaffna the widowed wife of her neighbor whom she had married just 6 months before his murder also attended the event .

== See also ==
- Sexual violence against Tamils in Sri Lanka
- Arumaithurai Tharmaletchumi
- Case of Wijikala Nanthan and Sivamani Sinnathamby Weerakon
- Ida Carmelitta
- Ilayathambi Tharsini
- Mary Madeleine
- Murugesapillai Koneswary
- Premawathi Manamperi
- Premini Thanuskodi
- Sarathambal
