= Ida Carmelitta =

Sri Lankan murder victim

- Born: 1980; Mannar, Sri Lanka
- Died: July 12, 1999; Pallimunai, Sri Lanka
- Parent(s): Sebastian and Anthoniya Fegerardo

Ida Carmelitta or Farheen Ida Carmelitta Laila Figerardo was a minority Sri Lankan Tamil woman who was gang raped and killed on 12 July 1999 and became a cause célèbre of the Sri Lankan civil war.

== Incident ==
According to her mother Sebastiana Figerardo, Ida Carmelita at the age of seventeen, joined the rebel LTTE group for four years after two of her brothers were murdered by government-aligned militias. She eventually left the rebel group. She had surrendered to the Sri Lankan police about a month before her murder.

On the night of July 12, 1999 five men broke into her mother's house, and, after tying up the occupants, proceeded to gang rape and kill her. The incident happened in the town of Pallimunai, in the Mannar district. In his report, the coroner in Mannar documented evidence of rape and sexual violence, including bites on her breasts and lips. She had been shot through her vagina.

Following her death, Ida's two brothers and sisters eventually fled to a refugee camp in India. Her mother initially stayed behind, determined to bring her daughter's killers to justice. However, she also left when Kumar Ponnambalam, the lawyer handling the case, was killed in Colombo in January 2000. Her murder attracted widespread media attention in Sri Lanka and elsewhere.

== Government investigation ==
Two of the suspects had been recognized by a neighbour and another by the brother of the victim before he fled to India. A corporal and a soldier of the Sri Lankan Army were identified at an identification parade by witnesses and taken into custody. However, after two key witnesses were threatened and subsequently fled to India, the case is no longer proceeding. The suspects have been released on bail.

Various witnesses testified at hearings held during the year. During the year, investigations conducted into the case found that the weapons used in the killing belonged to army personnel. Forensic experts have confirmed that the bullets used in Ida's murder correspond to those usually used by the army.

== Related to the incident ==
Napoleon Figerardo, a brother of Carmelita who was about to be deported to Sri Lanka from an Indian refugee camp, was given a reprieve because of the actions of Human Rights groups. According to JRS South Asia reports,

Human rights groups claim he is on the hit list of both the army and the rebels in Sri Lanka, so he will be killed if he returns.

His family has a history of violent deaths. Two of the brothers were killed in 1995 by rival Tamil militant groups.

== See also ==
- Sexual violence against Tamils in Sri Lanka
- Case of Wijikala Nanthan and Sivamani Sinnathamby Weerakon
- Krishanti Kumaraswamy
- Ilayathambi Tharsini
- Sarathambal
- Murugesapillai Koneswary
