= Murugesapillai Koneswary =

- Born: Sri Lanka
- Died: 17 May 1997; Kalmunai, Sri Lanka
- Occupation: Home maker

Murugesapillai Koneswary or Koneswary Murugesapillai was a minority Sri Lankan Tamil woman who was raped and killed on 17 May 1997 as part of the ongoing Sri Lankan civil war. The rape and murder received extensive local and international attention.

== Incident ==
Mrs. Koneswary was constantly harassed at the Central Camp checkpoint which is on the border of Amparai Batticaloa district. On the afternoon of May 17, 1997, Mrs. Koneswary was verbally assaulted and sexually harassed by four police officers at this checkpoint and defended herself by shouting at the officers and demanding that they leave her alone. At 11pm that same day, Mrs. Koneswary, a mother of four, was allegedly raped and killed by the police after carrying her four-year-old daughter away. It is reported that her rapists killed her by exploding a grenade on her abdomen thus destroying the evidence of any rape.

According to her neighbours, she had history of problems with the Central Camp police in the Kalmunai district in eastern Sri Lanka. During that time she had been subjected to alleged persistent harassment at the Central camp checkpoint.

Two months before she was killed, some police officers had allegedly cut and took away a Margosa tree from her yard. Although she is reported to have filed a complaint with the officer in charge at Central Camp immediately, nothing was done. Subsequently, Mrs. Koneswary complained to a deputy inspector general in Ampara, who intervened on her behalf, and instructed the local police to return the timber to the family. It was after this incident that the alleged verbal abuse and sexual harassment of Mrs. Koneswary began.

On May 17, around 11 p.m., as described by her four-year-old daughter, some "uncles with guns" had entered the hut, carried the little girl outside and left her near a neighbour's fence. According to villagers, Mrs. Koneswary had that night sent her three other children to her relatives who were living nearby. The little girl is the only witness to the ensuing crime.

== Reactions ==
In a letter to President Kumaratunga, Mothers' Front of Jaffna wrote,

"reprisals by the security forces against civilians and their property have now become a common feature. Tamil women in the north and east are no longer able to live with self-respect and dignity. Normal life in these parts of the country is severely hampered, as law-abiding citizens are prevented from going about their day-to-day life".

The Centre for Women's Research in Sri Lanka (CENWOR) also protested the rape. It asked the Sri Lankan president

"how can national and international credibility be acquired when this type of grave crime is committed by members of the armed forces against defenseless women."

The group also organized a protest march in the capital Colombo.

The rebel Liberation Tigers of Tamil Eelam reportedly retaliated for the rape and murder by attacking a Sri Lankan military camp resulting in the death of 23 people. Furthermore, LTTE's female unit attacked the police station, where Koneswary was allegedly raped, killing 15 police dead and more than 20 injured. After the attack a female LTTE cadre claimed "We wanted to avenge the rape of Koneswary Murugesupillai. We are proud that we were able to destroy the police station where she was raped and killed,".

== Investigations and results ==
The then president Chandrika Kumaratunga ordered an inquiry into the crime by the local the Criminal Investigation Department; According to UNHCHR no one has been convicted for the crime.

== See also ==
- Sexual violence against Tamils in Sri Lanka
- Case of Wijikala Nanthan and Sivamani Sinnathamby Weerakon
- Ilayathambi Tharsini
- Ida Carmelitta
- Krishanti Kumaraswamy
- Sarathambal
