= Ilayathambi Tharsini =

Sri Lankan murder victim (1985–2005)

Tharsini Ilayathamby
- Tharsini Ilayathamby
- Born: 1985; Jaffna, Sri Lanka
- Died: December 16, 2005; Pungututheevu, Sri Lanka
- Occupation: Student
- Parent: Ilayathamby

Ilayathamby Tharsini (also Tharsini Ilayathamby) was a minority Sri Lankan Tamil woman who was raped and killed in her home town of Pungudutheevu on December 16, 2005.

== Incident ==
On 16 December 2005 Tharsini Ilayathamby was on her way to her aunt's place. She was allegedly abducted by unknown men close to a Sri Lankan Navy post.

Her body was found the next day, completely naked, in an abandoned well near the Sri Lankan Navy camp at a place called Maduthuveli.

According to the post mortem report conducted at Jaffna Teaching Hospital, she was brutally raped before being strangled to death. Several injuries caused by fingernails and biting had been found on several parts of her body. One of her breasts had been severely bitten.

== Reactions ==
After the body was found locals violently protested in front of the Navy camp. One person was injured in the subsequent shootings. The locals destroyed an administrative building as a result. Sri Lankan Tamil diaspora groups also organized protest meetings in the UK.

Human Rights groups such as UTHR initially reported that she may have been killed by the rebel LTTE operatives to discredit the government and create an environment of protest. UTHR eventually retracted the statement that the victim had known the naval persons previously.

Subsequent to her death, there were number of attacks on the Sri Lankan Navy. The rebel LTTE denied attacking the naval personnel. Sri Lanka Monitoring Mission ruled that such attacks were a violation of the Oslo sponsored ceasefire between the Sri Lankan government and the LTTE. But number of websites that are known for their pro rebel stance reported that subsequent to the rape and murder, a front organization calling itself resurgence people's force, widely believed to be a front of the rebel LTTE group claimed responsibility for attacks on the Sri Lankan Navy that lead to 15 deaths and another 15 being seriously injured.

According to Tamilnet, Sri Lankan Tamil political parties such as the Tamil National Alliance and others requested that the Sri Lankan government take appropriate actions to protect civilian life.

== Government investigation ==
International and local Human rights organizations such as the ACHR, Home for Human Rights and UTHR have requested a thorough investigation be done to apprehend the culprits. Currently the government is investigating the rape and murder.

== See also ==
- Sexual violence against Tamils in Sri Lanka
- Krishanti Kumaraswamy
- Ida Carmelitta
- Sarathambal
- Murugesapillai Koneswary
