= Sarathambal =

Sri Lankan murder victim

Sarathambal funeral
- Father and 3-year-old daughter during the last rites at the burial grounds in Colombo
- Born: 1970; Jaffna, Sri Lanka
- Died: 28 December 1999; Pungudutivu, Sri Lanka
- Occupations: Housewife and mother
- Parent: Chandrasekara Sarma

Sarathambal Saravanbavananthatkurukal or better known as Sarathambal was a minority Sri Lankan Tamil woman who was gang raped and killed on 28 December 1999. This became an internationally known incident of the Sri Lankan Civil War.

== Incident ==
According to AHRC report on 28 December 1999, Mrs. Sarathambal Saravanbavananthakurukal, 29, daughter of a local Hindu temple priest was forcibly dragged out from her home, in Pungututheevu, near Jaffna Peninsula, allegedly by Sri Lankan Navy sailors.

According to the Amnesty International her house was situated at about 500 m from the nearest naval base and her father and brother were tied up allegedly by four security officers dressed in black. Her dead body was found on barren land about 100 m away from their home the next day.

After public protest at the village where the incident happened and in Jaffna her body was sent to the capital Colombo for post-mortem by a senior medical officer who indicated that the cause of death was "asphyxia due to gagging; her underpants had been stuffed inside her mouth, and that forcible sexual intercourse had taken place".

According to the pro-LTTE Tamilnet, her funeral was attended by a cross section of Sri Lankan activists from around the nation. Vasudeva Nanayakkara, then Member of Parliament, S.Sivadasan, the then EPDP Parliamentarian, Maheswary Velautham, Attorney-at-Law and the Secretary Of the Forum for Human Dignity and Nimalka Fernando of the Movement for Inter Racial, Justice and Equality delivered funeral orations.

== Government investigation ==
The government under then president Chandrika Kumaratunga ordered an immediate investigation but in mid-March 2000, U.N. Special Rapporteur on Violence against Women Radhika Coomaraswamy, emphasized the lack of government response to allegations of sexual violence by security personnel in Sri Lanka.

Furthermore she noted, that, despite a presidential directive, little effort had been made to investigate the December 1999 gang-rape and murder of Sarathambal Saravanbavananthatkurukal.

Amnesty International also allege that the victim's father and brother were allegedly threatened not to reveal the identity of the four men who came to the house. Also Director of the Sri Lanka Police's Criminal Investigation Department, who had been instructed by the President of Sri Lanka to investigate the rape and murder,

"the brother had not been able to identify any of the four persons who came to the house".

Amnesty International further mention that the alleged sailors who raped Sarathambal have been transferred from the area to prevent action being taken against them.

The Attorney General’s Department informed the Committee of Inquiry into Undue Arrest and Harassment (CIUAH). in late May 2001 that there will be no prosecution relating to the Sarathambal rape and murder case, as the police report contained no evidence on the offenders.

== See also ==
- Sexual violence against Tamils in Sri Lanka
- Case of Wijikala Nanthan and Sivamani Sinnathamby Weerakon
- Krishanti Kumaraswamy
- Ilayathambi Tharsini
- Ida Carmelitta
- Murugesapillai Koneswary

== Notes ==
- Protest: More than 500 villages staged a demonstration outside the navy camp in northern Sri Lanka to protest the rape and murder of Sarathambal. The protestors carried placards accusing members of the armed forces for carrying out the brutal crime they also told reporters, "We organised this demonstration not just to register our protest against the raping and murder, but this has become a matter for self, respect, not only for women, but also for men. That’s why we staged this demonstration carrying dry palmyrah leaves. We wanted to show the world the undignified manner in which the human beings in these areas are treated-human beings are treated not worth more than a dry palmyrah leaf." They went on to explain that there had been previously many unreported cases of harassment and sexual violence by security forces. According to the village people, whenever women and girls passed through a military barrier or checkpoint they were subjected to various kinds of dirty antics by the army forces.
- FFHD: Forum for Human Dignity was founded by Human Rights lawyer Maheswary Velautham and is known for tracking the status of returned failed refugee claimants from other countries to Sri Lanka particularly the West.
- MIRJE: Movement for Inter-Racial Justice & Equality was founded in Sri Lanka in 1979 . It was the first major majority Sinhalese based group calling for ethnic equality. It is currently almost defunct, but is a precursor of all other organizations and groups that have mushroomed in recent years calling for peace and ethnic equality from the People's Peace Front to Sri Lanka First.
- CIUAH: The government appointed a Committee of Inquiry into Undue Arrest and Harassment (CIUAH) in mid-December 2000 . The nine-member Committee was led by the then cabinet minister Lakshman Jayakody and included the then Justice minister Batty Weerakoon and other ministers such as GL Peiris, SB Dissanayake, Lakshman Kadirgamar and Douglas Devananda. The Committee was set up to receive complaints on illegal detention under the Prevention of Terrorism Act (PTA) and Emergency regulations, delay in cases, harassment by security forces during and after arrest, non-issue of arrest receipts, police registration, holding relatives as hostages and problems faced by people from north-east Sri Lanka.
