= List of massacres in Sri Lanka =

The following is a list of massacres that have occurred in Sri Lanka and its predecessors. (Numbers may be approximate.)

== List of massacres ==
Massacre	Date	Location	Deaths	Perpetrators	Refs
Madulla massacre	9 December 1817	Madulla	22	British Army	
Uva Rebellion	1818	Uva-Wellassa	Thousands	British Army	(Note: All males between 15 and 60 years were driven out, exiled or killed in the Uva Province.)
1915 Sinhalese-Muslim riots	28 May – 8 August 1915	Nationwide	63 (official)	Police	
1956 anti-Tamil pogrom	5–16 June 1956	Nationwide	150	Government, Sinhalese and Tamil rioters	
1958 anti-Tamil pogrom	May – June 1958	Nationwide	300−1500	Government, Sinhalese and Tamil rioters	
Attacks on civilians during the suppression of the JVP insurrection	1971	Nationwide	Tens of thousands	Government	
Tamil conference incident	10 January 1974	Jaffna	9	Police	
Puttalam massacre	2 February 1976	Puttalam	6–7	Police	
1977 anti-Tamil pogrom	August 1977	Nationwide	300	Government, Sinhalese and Tamil rioters	
Murunkan massacre	7 April 1978	Murunkan, Vavuniya	4	LTTE	
1981 anti-Tamil pogrom	June 1981-August 1981	Nationwide	25	Government	
Attacks on Tamils in Trincomalee	3-30 June 1983	Trincomalee	19	Armed Forces	
1983 anti-Tamil pogrom	May 1983-July 1983	Nationwide	3,000	Army, Government	
Thirunelveli massacre	24 July 1983	Thirunelveli, Jaffna	51	Army	
Welikada prison massacre	25–27 July 1983	Welikada Prison, Colombo	53	Sinhalese prisoners aided by Sinhalese prison guards	
Sampalthoddam massacre	January 1984	Sampalthoddam, Vavuniya	55–70	Army	
Chunnakam Police station massacre	8 January 1984	Chunnakam	19–20	Police	
Chunnakam market massacre	18 March 1984	Chunnakam	10	Air Force	
Spring 1984 Jaffna massacres	28 March 1984-May 1984	Various places in Jaffna	250	Army	
1984 Vavuniya massacre	13 August 1984	Vavuniya	6+	Army	
August 1984 Mannar massacre	13 August 1984	Mannar	90	Army	
Kaithady massacre	14 August 1984	Kaithady, Jaffna	9	Army	
1984 Point Pedro massacre	2 September 1984	Point Pedro, Jaffna	18	STF, Army	
Mallavi junction massacre	6 September 1984	Mallavi, Mullaitivu	5	Army	
Colombo-Jaffna coach massacre	11 September 1984	Mathawachchi	17	Army	
Jaffna grand bazaar massacre	1 November 1984	Jaffna	9	Army	
Jaffna army rampage	2 November 1984	Jaffna	8	Army	
Urumpirai killings	2 November 1984	Urumpirai, Jaffna	50	Army	
Mullaitivu massacre	6 November 1984	Mullaitivu	8	Army	
Jaffna town massacre	9 November 1984	Jaffna	10	Army	
Kasturiar Road/Power House road junction massacre	10 November 1984	Jaffna	5	Army	
Jaffna-Colombo train shooting of Tamil civilians	15 November 1984	Meesalai, Jaffna	several killed	Army	
Kopay massacre	18 November 1984	Kopay, Jaffna	6	Army	
Army rampage at Chavakachcheri	20 November 1984	Chavakachcheri, Jaffna	4	Army	
Killing of 4 Tamil civilians including a 7 year old boy	24 November 1984	Jaffna	4	Army	
Kent and Dollar Farm massacres	30 November 1984	Kent and Dollar Farms, Vavuniya	62	LTTE	
December 1984 massacres of Tamils	December 1984	Several places in Northern and Eastern provinces	1,200+	Armed Forces	
Kokilai massacre	1 December 1984	Kokilai	11	LTTE	
Othiyamalai massacre	December 1984	Othiyamalai, Mullaitivu	29–32	Army	
Nedunkerny massacre	1 December 1984	Nedunkerny, Vavuniya	200+	Army	
Semamadu massacre	2 December 1984	Semamadu, Vavuniya	29	Army	
Cheddikulam massacre	2 December 1984	Cheddikulam, Vavuniya	64	Army	
Kumulamunai massacre	2 December 1984	Kumulamunai, Mullaitivu	7	Army	According to pro-rebel NESOHR
Vavuniya army camp massacre	2 December 1984	Iratperiyakulam, Vavuniya	100+	Army	
Thennamarawadi massacre	2–4 December 1984	Thennamarawadi, Trincomalee	26	Army	
Manal Aru massacre	3 December 1984	Manal Aru, Mullaitivu	100+	Army	
Amaravayal massacre	3–4 December 1984	Amarivayal, Trincomalee	30–50	Army	
Mannar massacre	4 December 1984	Murunkan, Mannar	107–150	Army	
Vavuniya massacre	4 December 1984	Vavuniya	100	Army	
Asikulam massacre	4 December 1984	Asikulam, Vavuniya	6	Government armed mob	
Massacre of 18 Tamil fishermen	9 December 1984	Mullaitivu	18	Home Guards	
Madawachchiya massacre	11 December 1984	Madawachchiya	65	Home Guards	
Mullikulam massacre	13 December 1984	Mullikulam, Mannar	6	Army	
Kokkilai massacres	15 December 1984	Several locations, Mullaitivu	131	Army	
Mulliyavalai massacre	16 January 1985	Mulliyavalai, Mullaitivu	52	Army	
Thiriyai massacre	21 December 1984	Thiriyai, Trincomalee	9	Army	
Windsor cinema junction massacre	22 December 1984	Jaffna	Several killed	Army	
Muthur massacre	22-24 December 1984	Muthur, Trincomalee	7	Army	
Mullaitivu massacre	22-24 December 1984	Mullaitivu	24	Army	
Chemmani road massacre	5 January 1985	Chemmani road, Jaffna	4	Army	
Massacre of Tamil family in Vavuniya	5 January 1985	Vavuniya	5	Army	
Vankalai church massacre	6 January 1985	Vankalai	23	Army	
Vadakkandal massacre	30 January 1985	Vadakkandal, Mannar	52	Air Force, Army	
Army rampage in Jaffna town	6 February 1985	Jaffna	5	Army	
Mullaitivu massacre	15 February 1985	Mullaitivu	58	Army	
Pannai bridge massacre	24 March 1985	Jaffna	7	STF	
Puthukkudiyiruppu massacre	21 April 1985	Puthukkudiyiruppu, Mullaitivu	30	Army	
Maviddapuram massacre	26 February 1985	Maviddapuram, Jaffna	4	Army	
Mannar massacre	16 April 1985	Mannar	27	Army	
Karaitivu massacre	17 April 1985	Karaitivu, Ampara	27	STF	
Myliddy massacre	19 April 1985	Myliddy, Jaffna	4	Army	
Nelliaddy massacre	21 April 1985	Nelliaddy, Jaffna	9	Army	
1985 anti-Tamil pogrom in Karaitivu	22 April 1985	Karaitivu, Ampara	30	STF, state sponsored mobs	
Karaveddi massacre	29 April 1985	Karaveddi, Jaffna District	25+	Army	
1985 Trincomalee massacres	May–September 1985	Several places in Trincomalee	280+	Navy, Army, Home Guards	
Jaffna massacre	4 May 1985	Jaffna	4	Army	
Oorani massacre	9 May 1985	Oorani, Jaffna	30	Army	
Point Pedro massacre	10 May 1985	Point Pedro, Jaffna	100+	Army	
Valvettithurai massacre	12 May 1985	Valvettithurai, Jaffna	46–70	Army	
Anuradhapura massacre/Attack on Sri Maha Bodhi	14 May 1985	Anuradhapura	146	LTTE	
Kumudini boat massacre	15 May 1985	Jaffna	23	Navy	
Anaikottai massacre	15 May 1985	Anaikottai, Jaffna	5	Army	
Massacre of Tamil civilians in Anuradhapura	15 May 1985	Anuradhapura	7	Army	
Massacre of Tamil civilians in Vavuniya	15 May 1985	Vavuniya	7	Army	
Massacre of Tamil civilians in Anuradhapura army camp	17 May 1985	Anuradhapura	6−11	Army	
Thambiluvil massacre	17 May 1985	Thambiluvil, Ampara	20–40	Police (STF)	
Massacre of Tamil family in Pankulam	24 May 1985	Pankulam, Trincomalee District	7	Army	
Killiveddy massacre	30 May 1985	Killiveddy, Trincomalee	44	Police	
Massacre of Tamil civilians in Trincomalee	3 June 1985	Trincomalee	13	Army	
Thiriyai massacre	8 June 1985	Thiriyai, Trincomalee	10	Army	
Mannar massacre	14 June 1985	Kokudiyan and Adampanthalvu, Mannar	22	Army	
Karainagar massacre	22 July 1985	Karainagar, Jaffna	3	Navy	
Sampalthivu massacre	4-9 August 1985	Sampalthivu, Trincomalee	25+	Army, Navy, Air	
Vavuniya shooting spree and arson attacks	10 August 1985	Vavuniya	10	Police, Sri Lanka Armed Forces	
1985 Vavuniya massacre	16 August 1985	Vavuniya	200+	Army	
Vayaloor massacre	24 August 1985	Vayaloor, Kilinochchi	40	Army	
Murugapuri massacre	8 September 1985	Murugapuri Trincomalee	3	Army, Home Guards	
Thuvarankadu massacre	12 September 1985	Thuvarankadu, Trincomalee	22	Army	
Nilaveli massacre	16 September 1985	Nilaveli, Trincomalee	40	Army, Home Guards	
Kalvettu massacre	20 September 1985	Kalvettu, Ampara	15	Home guards	
Sinnawathai massacre	20 September 1985	Sinnawathai, Batticaloa	10	STF	
Aarapathai massacre	26 September 1985	Aarapathai, Navatkudah, Batticaloa	7	STF	
Sambaltivu massacre	1 October 1985	Sambaltivu, Trincomalee	4	Army	
Piramanthanaru massacre	2 October 1985	Piramanthanaru, Kilinochchi	16	Army, Keenie Meenie Services	
Oddusuddan massacre	2 October 1985	Oddusuddan, Mullaitivu	18	Army	
Murakkottanchenai massacre	5 October 1985	Murakkottanchenai, Batticaloa	12	STF	
1985 Muttur massacre	8-10 November 1985	Muttur, Trincomalee	30-100	Army, Navy, Air Force	
Kantalai massacre	9 November 1985	Kantalai, Trincomalee	6	Army	
Batticaloa Lake Road massacre	13 November 1985	Lake Road, Batticaloa	13	STF	
Army rampage in Batticaloa	16 November 1985	Bar Road, Batticaloa	8-scores killed	Army	
Onthachimadam shooting	23 November 1985	Onthachimadam, Batticaloa	8	Army	
Sampur massacre	27 November 1985	Sampur, Trincomalee	21	Army, Navy, Home guards	
Muttur massacres	28 November 1985	Sampur and Kaddaiparichchan, Trincomalee	16	government forces	
Mandur massacre	28 November 1985	Mandur, Batticaloa	24	Sri Lankan Air Force	
Thiruvaiyaru attack	29 November 1985	Thiruvaiyaru, Kilinochchi	4	Sri Lankan Army	
Thampalakamam raid	30 November 1985	Thampalakamam, Trincomalee	7	Sri Lankan Army	
Kalladi shooting	1 December 1985	Kalladi, Batticaloa	6	Sri Lankan Army	
Uruthirapuram massacre	10 December 1985	Uruthirapuram, Kilinochchi	10	Army	
Jaffna helicopter shootings	21 December 1985	Suthumalai, Manipay, Sanguveli, Thavadi, Uduvil, Inuvil, Kokkuvil, Vayavilan, Kadduvan and Myliddy, Jaffna	7	Air Force	
Jaffna helicopter massacres	4 January 1986	Jaffna	17	Air Force	
Vankalai church massacre	6 January 1986	Vankalai, Mannar	8	Army	
Jaffna massacres	23 January 1986	Tellipalai, Veemankamam, Kadduvan	16	Armed Forces	
Iruthayapuram massacre	19 January 1986	Iruthayapuram, Batticaloa	23	Police	
Kilinochchi Railway Station massacre	25 January 1986	Kilinochchi	12	Army	
Thampalakamam massacre	27 January 1986	Thampalakamam, Trincomalee	10	Army	
Massacre of Tamil private van passengers	1 February 1986	Elephant Pass, Jaffna	29	Army	
Bombing raid on Jaffna	19 February 1986	Jaffna	7	Air Force	
Akkaraipattu massacre	19 February 1986	Akkaraipattu, Ampara	80	Army	
Nainativu massacre	3 March 1986	Nainativu, Jaffna	4	Army	
Myliddy bombings	13 March 1986	Jaffna	5	Air Force	
Kilinochchi massacre	16 March 1986	Kilinochchi	7	Army	
Muthur massacre	16 March 1986	Muthur, Trincomalee	5	Army	
Mallikaitivu junction massacre	17 March 1986	Muthur, Trincomalee	5	Army	
Kilinochchi massacre	18 March 1986	Kilinochchi	4	Army	
Vavuniya massacres	19-20 March 1986	Eeddimurnchan village. Nedunkerny	20	Army	
Puthukudirruppu massacre	21 March 1986	Puthukudirruppu, Mullaitivu	7	Army	
Selvasannithy temple attack	21-22 March 1986	Jaffna	4	Army	
Vavuniya massacre	25 March 1986	Vavuniya	5	Army	
Massacre of Trincomalee Tamil refugees	30 April 1986	Muthur, Thiriyay Trincomalee	17	Army	
Air Lanka Flight 512	3 May 1986	Bandaranaike International Airport, Katunayake	21	LTTE	
Gurunagar fishermen sea massacre	10 June 1986	Mandaitivu, Jaffna	33	Navy	
Seruvila massacre	12 June 1986	Seruvila, Trincomalee	21	Home Guards	
1986 Thambalakamam massacre	28 June 1986	Thambalakamam, Trincomalee	34	Home Guards	
Pavatkulam massacre	13 July 1986	Pavatkulam, Vavuniya	9	Army	
Peruveli refugee camp massacre	15 July 1986	Peruveli, Trincomalee	48	Army, Home Guards	
Thanduvan bus massacre	17 July 1986	Thanduvan, Mullaitivu	17	Army	According to pro-rebel NESOHR
Manalchenai massacre	18 July 1986	Manalchenai, Trincomalee	67	Army	
Batticaloa Munnai street massacre	18 September 1986	Batticaloa	47	Army	
Kurikattuvan massacre	16 October 1986	Kurikattuvan, Jaffna	13	Navy	
Jaffna Hospital bombing	29 October 1986	Jaffna	4	Army	
Massacre of Batticaloa refugees	31 October 1986	Batticaloa	6	Army	
Jaffna bombings	11 November 1986	Jaffna	6	Army	
Periya-pullumalai massacre	11 November 1986	Periya-pullumalai, Ampara	20	Army	
Coolavady colony massacre	23 November 1986	Coolavady colony, Batticaloa	3	STF	
Kalmunai police rampage	13 December 1986	Kalmunai, Ampara	4	Police, STF	
Attacks on civilians during the suppression of the 2nd JVP insurrection	1987-89	Nationwide	60,000-80,000	Government	
Prawn farm massacre / Kokkadichcholai massacre	27-29 January 1987	Kokkadichcholai, Batticaloa	200+	Police (STF)	
Jaffna bombings	7 March 1987	Jaffna	21	Air Force	
Pavatkuli Chenai Pillaiyar Kovil massacre	3 July 1987	Pavatkuli Chenai, Batticaloa	48	STF	
Aluth Oya massacre	17 April 1987	Habarana, Anuradhapura	127	LTTE	
Central Bus Station bombing	21 April 1987	Colombo	116	LTTE	
Aranthalawa massacre	2 June 1987	Aranthalawa, Ampara	33	LTTE	
1987 Eastern Province massacres	29 September – 8 October 1987	Eastern Province	200+	LTTE	
Jaffna hospital massacre	21–22 October 1987	Jaffna	68–70	IPKF	
Tissamaharama massacre	November 1987	Tissamaharama		Sri Lankan Armed Forces	
Batticaloa police rampage	24 December 1987	Batticaloa	25	Police	
Valvettiturai massacre	2–3 August 1989	Valvettiturai, Jaffna	64	IPKF	
Eppawala massacre	20 March 1989	Eppawala	14	Black Cat group	
1989 Kandy massacre	16 September 1989	Several places in Kandy District	100-150	Eagles of the Central Hills	
Hambantota district massacres	21 December 1989	Hambantota, Tissamaharama, Ambalantota, Beliatta	177	Army, Police	
Nittambuwa massacre	27 February 1990	Nittambuwa	12	Police	
Killings of Tamils in Amparai	June - October 1990	Amparai	3,000	government forces	
Disappearances of Tamils in Batticaloa	June - December 1990	Batticaloa	1,500	government forces	
Sammanthurai massacre	10 June 1990	Sammanthurai, Ampara	37	Home Guards	According to pro-rebel NESOHR
Police officers massacre	11 June 1990		600–774	LTTE	
Kalmunai massacre	12 June 1990	Kalmunai, Ampara	160-250	Army	
Vavuniya massacre	13 June 1990	Vavuniya	15	Army	
Trincomalee Base Hospital mass arrest and disappearances	15 June 1990	Base Hospital, Trincomalee	30	Army	
Thiriyai massacre	June 1990 (mid)	Thiriyai, Trincomalee	25-35	Army	
Vellaveli massacre	June 1990	Vellaveli, Batticaloa	15	Army	
Veeramunai massacres	20 June 1990 - 15 August 1990	Veeramunai, Ampara	253	Home Guards	
Kalmunai massacres	22-23 June 1990	Kalmunai, Ampara	36+	Army	
Veeramunai massacres	20 June 1990 - 15 August 1990	Veeramunai, Ampara	253	Home Guards	
China Bay Police custody killings	4 July 1990	China Bay, Trincomalee	5	Police	
Kalmunai massacre	10 July 1990	Kalmunai, Ampara	31	Army, Home Guards	
McHeyzer Stadium mass arrest and disappearances	11 July 1990	Plantain Point Army Camp, Trincomalee	52	Army	
Paranthan junction massacre	24 July 1990	Paranthan, Kilinochchi	10	Army	According to pro-rebel NESOHR
Siththandy massacre	20 July 1990 and 27 July 1990	Siththandy, Batticaloa	137	Army	According to pro-rebel NESOHR
Pottuvil massacre	30 July 1990	Pottuvil, Ampara	125	Army	
Kattankudy mosque massacre	3 August 1990	Kattankudy, Batticaloa	147	LTTE	
Tiraikerny massacre	6 August 1990	Tiraikerny, Ampara	40	Home Guards	
Xavierpuram massacre	7 August 1990	Alikampai, Ampara	7	Home Guards	
Kalmunai massacres	11-12 August 1990	Karaitivu military camp, Ampara	62	Army	According to pro-rebel NESOHR
Thuranilavani massacre	12 August 1990	Thuranilavani, Batticaloa	60+	Army	According to pro-rebel NESOHR
Koraveli massacre	14 August 1990	Koraveli, Batticaloa	15	Army	According to pro-rebel NESOHR
Oddusuddan bombing	14 August 1990	Oddusuddan, Mullaitivu	23	Air Force	According to pro-rebel NESOHR
Neliiyadi marketing bombing	29 August 1990	Neliiyadi, Jaffna	16	Army	According to pro-rebel NESOHR
Eastern University massacre (September 1990)	5 September 1990	Vantharumulai, Batticaloa	158	Army	
Batticaloa massacre / Sathurukondan massacre	9 September 1990	Batticaloa	205	Army	
Natipiddymunai masscre	10 September 1990	Natipiddymunai, Ampara	23	Police STF	According to pro-rebel NESOHR
Killing of Tamils in Pottuvil	October 1990	Pottuvil, Ampara	160	Police STF	
Chavakachcheri market massacre	9 October 1990	Chavakachcheri, Jaffna	12	Army	
Karaitivu massacre	13 October 1990	Karaitivu, Ampara	20	STF	
Karainagar naval attack	15 November 1990	Karainagar, Jaffna	5	Navy	
Velanai bombing	16 December 1990	Velanai Jaffna	4	Air Force	
Thathamalai massacre	17 December 1990	Thathamalai, Batticaloa	5	Army	
Massacre of Tamil civilians near Samadhu Pillaiyar Temple	18 December 1990	Trincomalee	5	Army	
Valaichchenai massacre	22 December 1990	Valaichchenai, Batticaloa	9	Home guards	
Puthukudiyiruppu bombing	31 January 1991	Puthukudiyiruppu, Mullaitivu	23	Air Force	
Valvettithurai bombings	20-23 January 1991	Valvettithurai, Jaffna	10	Air Force	
Jaffna bombings	February 1991 (first week)	Jaffna	27	Air Force	
Kondaichchi massacre	February 1991	Kondaichchi, Mannar	4	Army	
Vankalai junction massacre	17 February 1991	Vankalai, Mannar	4	Army	
Eravur massacre	20 February 1991	Eravur, Batticaloa	6	Home Guards	
Iruthayapuram massacre	30 March 1991	Iruthayapuram, Batticaloa	11	Police	
Nayanmar Thidal massacre	12 April 1991	Nayanmar Thidal, Tampalakamam, Trincomalee	4	Army	
Kokkadichcholai massacre	12 June 1991	Kokkadichcholai, Batticaloa	152-220	Army	
Palliyagodella massacre	15 October 1991	Palliyagodella, Polonnaruwa	109	LTTE	
Disappearances of Tamils in Batticaloa	January - November 1992	Batticaloa	400	government forces	
Mandur massacre	April 1992	Mandur, Batticaloa	8	Army, Paramilitaries	
Tampalakamam massacre	April 1992	Tampalakamam, Trincomalee	4	Army	
Polonnaruwa massacre	29 April 1992	Muthugal and Karapola	87	Home Guards, Police	
Vathappali Kannagi Amman temple massacre	18 May 1992	Vathappali, Mullaitivu	23	Army	
Sri Durga Devi temple massacre	31 May 1992	Tellipalai, Jaffna	6	Air Force	
Mylanthanai massacre	9 August 1992	Mylanthanai, Batticaloa	35-50	Army	
Paliyadivaddai massacre	24 October 1992	Paliyadivaddai, Batticaloa	10-11		
1993 Jaffna lagoon massacre / Kilaly massacre	2 January 1993	Jaffna Lagoon	50-100	Navy	
Vannathi Aru massacre	17 February 1993	Vannathi Aru, Batticaloa	16	Army	
Kalviankadu massacre	27 July 1993	Kalviankadu, Jaffna	6	Air Force	
Jaffna lagoon massacre	29 July 1993	Jaffna Lagoon	19	Navy	
Chundikulam massacre	18 February 1994	Chundikulam, Kilinochchi	10	Navy	According to pro-rebel NESOHR
1994 Jaffna lagoon massacre	27 February 1994	Jaffna Lagoon	30	Air Force	
Pulmoddai massacre	6 May 1995	Pulmoddai, Trincomalee	5	Army	
Kallarawa massacre	25 May 1995	Kallarawa, Trincomalee	42	LTTE	
Navaly church bombing	9 July 1995	Navaly, Jaffna	125-150	Air Force	
Bolgoda killings	April–September 1995	Colombo	31	STF	
Nagerkovil school bombing	22 September 1995	Nagerkovil, Jaffna	71-113	Air Force	
Jaffna killings	October 1995	Jaffna	104	Air Force, Army	
Eastern Sri Lanka massacres	16 October 1995	Villages in Eastern Sri Lanka	120	LTTE	
Padaviya massacre	21 October 1995	Padaviya, Anuradhapura	19	LTTE	
Boatta massacre	21 October 1995	Botalla, Polonnaruwa	36	LTTE	
Central Bank bombing	31 January 1996	Central Bank of Sri Lanka, Colombo	91	LTTE	
Kumarapuram massacre / Trincomalee massacre / Killiveddy massacre	11 February 1996	Kumarapuram, Trincomalee	26	Army	
Nachchikuda strafing	16 March 1996	Poonagari, Jaffna	16	Army	
Dehiwala train bombing	24 July 1996	Dehiwala	64	LTTE	
Kilinochchi town massacre	August 1996	Kilinochchi	184	Army	According to pro-rebel NESOHR
Disappearances and mass graves in Jaffna	1995-1996	Jaffna, Chemmani	600	Army	
Vavunikulam church bombing	18 August 1997	Vavunikulam, Mullaitivu	9	Air Force	According to pro-rebel TamilNet
Tamil 4th colony massacre	24 September 1997	Amparai	8-15	Home Guards	According to pro-rebel TamilNet
Temple of the Tooth attack	25 January 1998	Temple of the Tooth, Kandy	17	LTTE	
Tampalakamam massacre	1 February 1998	Tampalakamam, Trincomalee	8	Police, Home Guards	
Vattakkachchi and Periyakulam bombings	26 March 1998	Vaddakachchi, Periyakulam, Kilinochchi	8	Air Force	According to pro-rebel TamilNet
Suthanthirapuram bombing	10 June 1998	Suthanthirapuram, Mullaitivu	20+	Air Force	According to pro-rebel TamilNet
Lionair Flight 602	29 September 1998	Mannar	55	LTTE	
Kilinochchi bombing	24 November 1998	Kilinochchi-Mullaithivu	4	Army	According to pro-rebel TamilNet
Visuvamadhu shelling	25 November 1998	Puthukkudiyiruppu	8	Air Force	According to pro-rebel NESOHR
Chundikulam massacre	2 December 1998	Chundikulam, Kilinochchi	7	Air Force	According to pro-rebel NESOHR
Puthukkudiyiruppu bombing	15 September 1999	Puthukkudiyiruppu	21	Air Force	
Jaffna Lagoon massacre	15 September 1999	Thenmaradchi	7	Army	According to pro-rebel TamilNet
Gonagala massacre	18 September 1999	Gonagala, Ampara	50	LTTE	
Madhu church shelling	20 November 1999	Madhu, Mannar	40	Air Force	
Pallikuda bombing	12 May 2000	Pallikuda, Kilinochchi	5	Air Force	
Silivaturai massacre	13 May 2000	Silivaturai	5	Navy	
Columbuthurai massacre	15 May 2000	Columbuthurai, Jaffna	5	Army	
Bindunuwewa massacre	25 October 2000	Bindunuwewa	25	Mobs, Police, Army	
Mirusuvil massacre	20 December 2000	Mirusuvil, Jaffna	8	Army	
Pesalai massacre	23 December 2005	Pesalai, Mannar	4	Navy	
Murders of Kilinochchi civilians	27 December 2005	Kilinochchi, Kanakarayankulam, Pallai	5	Army	According to pro-rebel TamilNet
Murders of Tamil civilians at Mutthirai Junction	28 December 2005	Nallur, Jaffna	2	Army	According to pro-rebel TamilNet
Trincomalee student massacre	2 January 2006	Trincomalee	5	Police (STF)	
2006 murder of TRO workers	31 January 2006	Batticaloa	7	TMVP	
2006 anti-Tamil riots in Trincomalee	12 April 2006	Trincomalee	19	Sinhalese mobs, Navy, Army	
Vatharavathai massacre	19 April 2006	Vatharavathai, Jaffna	5	Army	According to pro-rebel TamilNet
Gomarankadawala massacre	23 April 2006	Gomarankadawala, Trincomalee	6	LTTE	
Attack on Muthur villages by SL Navy, Army, and Air Force	25 April 2006	Trincomalee	16	SL Navy, Army, and SLAF	According to pro-rebel TamilNet
Jaffna civilian youths massacre	4 May 2006	Jaffna	7	Army	
Manthuvil massacre	8 May 2006	Manthuvil, Jaffna	8	Army	
Allaipiddy massacre	13 May 2006	Allaipiddy, Jaffna	13	Navy, EPDP	
Nedunkal pressure mine attack	7 June 2006	Nedunkal, Batticaloa	10	Army	According to pro-LTTE TamilNet
Vankalai massacre	8 June 2006	Vankalai, Mannar	4	|Army	
Kebithigollewa massacre	15 June 2006	Kebithigollewa, Anuradhapura	66	LTTE	
Pesalai Church attack	17 June 2006	Pesalai, Mannar	6	Navy	
Indiscriminate artillery fire of Muttur	4 August 2006	Trincomalee	22	Army	According to pro-rebel TamilNet
Trincomalee massacre of NGO workers / Muttur massacre, Trincomalee District	4 August 2006	Muttur	17	Police, Home Guards	
Shelling of Nallur and Upooral villages	6 August 2006	Muttur and Eachchilampathu, Trincomalee District	15	Army and Navy	According to pro-rebel TamilNet
Killing of Tamil civilians in Kathiraveli	10 August 2006	Kathiraveli and surrounding villages, Batticaloa	50	Air Force and Army	According to pro-rebel TamilNet
Disappearance of Tamil civilians by GoSL-controlled Karuna paramilitaries	11 August 2006 - 13 August 2006	Batticaloa	15	Army and TMVP	According to pro-rebel TamilNet
Artillery attack on Jaffna Hindu devotees	12 August 2006	Near Muhamalai, Jaffna	7	Army	According to pro-rebel TamilNet
St. Philip Neri Church shelling	13 August 2006	Allaipiddy, Jaffna	40	Army	
Chencholai bombing	14 August 2006	Mullaitivu	61	Air Force	
Sampoor shelling and bombing	28 August 2006	Sampoor, Trincomalee	20	Army and Air Force	According to pro-rebel TamilNet
Digampathana bombing / Habarana massacre	16 October 2006	Digampathaha, Matale	92–103 navy sailors	LTTE	
Kilinochchi bombing	2 November 2006	Kilinochchi	5	Air Force	
Vaharai Bombing / Vaharai Shelling	7 November 2006	Kathiraveli, Batticaloa	47	Army	
Massacre at Thandikulam	19 November 2006	Thandikulam, Vavuniya	5	Police, Army	
Padahuthurai bombing / Illuppaikadavai bombing	2 January 2007	Illuppaikadavai, Mannar	16	Air Force	
Mannar mass killings	January 2007-February 2007	Mannar	55	Armed Forces	According to pro-rebel TamilNet
Siththaandi massacre	30 March 2007	Siththaandi, Batticaloa	9	Army	According to pro-rebel TamilNet
Piramanalankulam massacre	8 April 2007	Piramanalankulam, Vavuniya	8	Army	According to pro-rebel TamilNet
Andiyapuliayankulam massacre	24 April 2007	Andiyapuliayankulam, Mannar	4	Army	According to pro-rebel TamilNet
Batticaloa shootings	12 June 2007	Batticaloa	5	Army	According to pro-rebel TamilNet
Kizhavankulam massacre	10 July 2007	Kizhavankulam, Kilinochchi	5	Army	According to pro-rebel TamilNet
Kaithadi killings	13 August 2007	Kaithadi, Jaffna	8	Army	According to pro-rebel TamilNet
Paasiththenral massacre	1 September 2007	Paasiththenral, Mannar	12	Army	According to pro-rebel TamilNet
Tharmapuram massacre	25 November 2007	Tharmapuram, Kilinochchi	4	Air Force	According to pro-rebel TamilNet
Massacre of school girls at Iyangkea'ni	27 November 2007	Iyangkea'ni, Kilinochchi	7	Army	According to pro-rebel TamilNet
Massacre of civilians near VoT radio station	27 November 2007	Kilinochchi	11	Air Force	According to pro-rebel TamilNet
Poonakari massacre	22 February 2008	Poonakari, Kilinochchi	8	Air Force	According to pro-rebel TamilNet
Massacre of Tamil civilians by Deep Penetration Unit	27 February 2008	Mullaitivu	8	Army	According to pro-rebel TamilNet
Murukandy claymore attack	23 May 2008	Murukandy, Kilinochchi	16	Army	According to pro-LTTE TamilNet
Shelling of Jaffna coastal villages	29 May 2008	Jaffna	6	Army	According to pro-LTTE TamilNet
Puthoor massacre	2 June 2008	Puthoor, Mullaitivu	6	Army	According to pro-rebel TamilNet
Puthukkudiyiruppu bombing	15 June 2008	Puthukkudiyiruppu, Mullaitivu	4	Air Force	According to pro-rebel TamilNet
Puthumurippu massacre	30 August 2008	Puthumurippu, Kilinochchi	5	Army	According to pro-rebel TamilNet
Thirukkoayil massacre	16 October 2008	Thirukkoayil, Ampara	4	STF	According to pro-rebel TamilNet
Murasumoaddai bombing	31 December 2008	Murasumoaddai, Kilinochchi	5	Air Force	According to pro-rebel TamilNet
Bombing of Murasumoaddai	1 January 2009	Murasumoaddai, Kilinochchi	5	Air Force	According to pro-rebel TamilNet
Mullaitivu petrol station and bus depot bombing	2 January 2009	Mullaitivu	4	Air Force	
Shelling and bombardment of Kilinochchi	1-7 January 2009	Kilinochchi	12	Army	According to pro-rebel TamilNet
Thevipuram and Vaddakachchi shelling	8 January 2009	Thevipuram, Vaddakachchi, Mullaitivu	5	Army	
Tharmapuram Hospital shelling	8 January 2009	Tharmapuram, Mullaitivu	7	Army	
Shelling of Puthukkudiyiruppu	11 January 2009	Puthukkudiyiruppu, Mullaitivu	4	Army	According to pro-rebel TamilNet
Shelling and bombardment of Kaiveali, Koampaavil, and Visuvamadu	16 January 2009	Kaiveali, Koampaavil, and Visuvamadu, Mullaitivu	5	Army	According to pro-rebel TamilNet
Visuvamadu shelling	17-20 January 2009	Visuamadu, Mullaitivu	17	Army	
Shelling and bombardment of Mullaitivu and Kilinochchi suburbs	18 January 2009	Mullaitivu, Kilinochchi	18+	Army	According to pro-rebel TamilNet
No Fire Zone shelling and bombardment	19 January 2009	No Fire Zone, Mullaitivu	16	Army	According to pro-rebel TamilNet
Suthanthirapuram, Thevipuram, Udayarkattu and Vallipuram shelling	20 January 2009	Suthanthirapuram, Thevipuram, Udayarkattu, Vallipuram, Mullaitivu	18+	Army	
Vallipuram Hospital shelling	22 January 2009	Vallipuram, Mullaitivu	5	Army	
Moonkilaru, Thevipuram and Udayarkattu shelling	22 January 2009	Moonkilaru, Thevipuram, Udayarkattu, Mullaitivu	40	Army	
No Fire Zone shelling and bombardment	23 January 2009	No Fire Zone, Mullaitivu	5	Army	According to pro-rebel TamilNet
Suthanthirapuram shelling	24 January 2009	Suthanthirapuram Junction, Mullaitivu	11+	Army	
Udaiyaarkaddu shelling	24 January 2009	Udaiyaarkaddu, Mullaitivu	12	Army	According to pro-rebel TamilNet
No Fire Zone shelling and bombardment	25 January 2009	No Fire Zone, Mullaitivu	22	Army	According to pro-rebel TamilNet
Suthanthirapuram and Udayarkattu shelling	26 January 2009	Suthanthirapuram, Udayarkattu, Mullaitivu	11	Army	
Puthukkudiyiruppu shelling	26-31 January 2009	Puthukkudiyiruppu, Mullaitivu	210	Army	
Udayaarkaddu Hospital shelling	26 January 2009	Udayaarkaddu, Mullaitivu	12	Army	
No Fire Zone shelling and bombardment	26-28 January 2009	No Fire Zone, Mullaitivu	346	Army	According to pro-rebel TamilNet
Suthanthirapuram bombardment	29 January 2009	Suthanthirapuram, Mullaitivu	44	Army	According to pro-rebel TamilNet
Moongkilaaru bombardment	31 January-1 February 2009	Moongkilaaru, Mullaitivu	43+	Air Force	According to pro-rebel TamilNet
Puthukkudiyiruppu Hospital shelling	1-3 February 2009	Puthukkudiyiruppu, Mullaitivu	9+	Army	
Suthanthirapuram shelling	3 February 2009	Suthanthirapuram, Mullaitivu	3-58	Army	
No Fire Zone shelling and bombardment	3-4 February 2009	No Fire Zone, Mullaitivu	150+	Army	According to pro-rebel TamilNet
Ponnambalam Memorial Hospital bombing	5-6 February 2009	Near Puthukkudiyiruppu, Mullaitivu	75 (up to)	Army	
Mahtalan, Moongilaru, Suthanthirapuram, Thevipuram, Udayarkattu and Vallipuram shelling	6 February 2009	Mahtalan, Moongilaru, Suthanthirapuram, Thevipuram, Udayarkattu, Vallipuram, Mullaitivu	48	Army	
Puthukkudiyiruppu shelling	7 February 2009	Puthukkudiyiruppu, Mullaitivu	126	Army	
Putumattalan shelling	7 February 2009	Putumattalan, Mullaitivu	4	Army	
Suthanthirapuram shelling	7 February 2009	Suthanthirapuram, Mullaitivu	80	Army	
No Fire Zone shelling and bombardment	9 February 2009	No Fire Zone, Mullaitivu	36	Army	According to pro-rebel TamilNet
Devipuram shelling	9 February 2009	Devipuram, Mullaitivu	7	Army	
Mattalan shelling	9 February 2009	Mattalan, Mullaitivu	16	Army	
Putumattalan Hospital shelling	9 February-20 April 2009	Putumattalan, Mullaitivu	51+	Army	
Indiscriminate shelling in Mullaitivu	10-12 February 2009	Mullaitivu	240+	Army	According to pro-rebel TamilNet
Mattalan, Thevipuram and Vallipuram shelling	11-12 February 2009	Mattalan, Thevipuram, Vallipuram, Mullaitivu	69	Army	
Iranaipalai shelling	13 February 2009	Iranaipalai, Mullaitivu	9	Army	
Puthukkudiyiruppu Hospital shelling	13 February 2009	Puthukkudiyiruppu, Mullaitivu	14	Army	
Thevipuram and Vallipuram shelling	14 February 2009	Thevipuram, Vallipuram, Mullaitivu	36	Army	
No Fire Zone shelling and bombardment	14-16 February 2009	No Fire Zone, Mullaitivu	275	Army	According to pro-rebel TamilNet
Mullivaikkal and Putumattalan bombing and shelling	15 February 2009	Mullivaikkal, Putumattalan, Mullaitivu	19	Army, Air Force	
Valayanmadam shelling	15 February 2009	Valayanmadam, Mullaitivu	62	Army	
Mattalan shelling	16 February 2009	Valayanmadam, Mullaitivu	65	Army	
Valayanmadam shelling	17 February 2009	Valayanmadam, Mullaitivu	48	Army	
Ampalavanpokkanai, Idaikdu and Puthukkudiyiruppu shelling	18 February 2009	Ampalavanpokkanai, Idaikdu, Puthukkudiyiruppu, Mullaitivu	128	Army	
Valayanmadam bombing	19 February 2009	Valayanmadam, Mullaitivu	100+	Air Force	
Ananthapuram, Iranaipalai, Mullivaikkal and Puthukkudiyiruppu shelling	19 February 2009	Ananthapuram, Iranaipalai, Mullivaikkal, Puthukkudiyiruppu, Mullaitivu	17	Army	
Valayanmadam shelling	20 February 2009	Valayanmadam, Mullaitivu	12	Army	
Ananthapuram, Iranaipalai, Pokkanai, Puthukkudiyiruppu and Valayanmadam shelling	20 February 2009	Ananthapuram, Iranaipalai, Pokkanai, Puthukkudiyiruppu, Valayanmadam, Mullaitivu	92	Army	
Ampalavanpokkanai, Mattalan, Mullivaikkal, Pokkanai and Valayanmadam shelling	21 February 2009	Ampalavanpokkanai, Mattalan, Mullivaikkal, Pokkanai, Valayanmadam, Mullaitivu	69	Army	
Ananthapuram and Iranaipalai shelling	21 February 2009	Ananthapuram, Iranaipalai, Mullaitivu	13	Army	
No Fire Zone shelling	21-22 February 2009	No Fire Zone, Mullaitivu	50	Army	According to pro-rebel TamilNet
Puthukkudiyiruppu bombing and shelling	25-26 February 2009	Puthukkudiyiruppu, Mullaitivu	45	Army, Air Force	
Mullaitivu shelling	31 February-2 March 2009	Mullaitivu	122	Army	According to pro-rebel TamilNet
Mattalan hospital bombing	3 March 2009	Mattalan, Mullaitivu	13	Army	According to pro-rebel TamilNet
No Fire Zone shelling	4 March 2009	No Fire Zone, Mullaitivu	78	Army	According to pro-rebel TamilNet
Ampalavakanai and Mullivaikkal shelling	4 March 2009	Ampalavakanai, Mullivaikkal, Mullaitivu	58	Army	
Mattalan and Valayanmadam shelling	5 March 2009	Mattalan, Valayanmadam, Mullaitivu	57	Army	
Mattalan and Valayanmadam shelling	7 March 2009	Mattalan, Valayanmadam, Mullaitivu	51-52	Army	
No Fire Zone shelling	9 March 2009	No Fire Zone, Mullaitivu	21-52	Army	
No Fire Zone shelling	10 March 2009	No Fire Zone, Mullaitivu	133	Army	According to pro-rebel TamilNet
No Fire Zone shelling	11 March 2009	No Fire Zone, Mullaitivu	72	Army	
No Fire Zone shelling	12 March 2009	No Fire Zone, Mullaitivu	32-38	Army	
No Fire Zone shelling	12 March 2009	No Fire Zone, Mullaitivu	82	Army	According to pro-rebel TamilNet
Pokkanai shelling	12 March 2009	Pokkanai, Mullaitivu	5	Army	
Mattalan, Mullivaikkal and Pokkanai shelling	13 March 2009	Mattalan, Mullivaikkal, Pokkanai, Mullaitivu	52	Army	
Mattalan shelling	13 March 2009	Mattalan, Mullaitivu	8	Army	
No Fire Zone shelling and bombardment	14 March 2009	No Fire Zone, Mullaitivu	69	Army, Air Force	According to pro-rebel TamilNet
No Fire Zone shelling and bombardment	15-17 March 2009	No Fire Zone, Mullaitivu	137	Army, Air Force	According to pro-rebel TamilNet
Valayanmadam bombing	17 March 2009	Valayanmadam, Mullaitivu	26	Air Force	
No Fire Zone shelling	18-20 March 2009	No Fire Zone, Mullaitivu	102	Army	According to pro-rebel TamilNet
Valayanmadam shelling	20 March 2009	Valayanmadam, Mullaitivu	5	Army	
No Fire Zone shelling and bombardment	21 March 2009	No Fire Zone, Mullaitivu	42	Army, Air Force	According to pro-rebel TamilNet
No Fire Zone bombardment	22-23 March 2009	No Fire Zone, Mullaitivu	128	Army	According to pro-rebel TamilNet
Mullivaikkal, Putumattalan and Valayanmadam shelling	23 March 2009	Mullivaikkal, Putumattalan, Valayanmadam, Mullaitivu	100+	Army	
No Fire Zone shelling and bombardment	24 March 2009	No Fire Zone, Mullaitivu	62	Army	According to pro-rebel TamilNet
No Fire Zone shelling and bombardment	25 March 2009	No Fire Zone, Mullaitivu	131	Army, Air Force	According to pro-rebel TamilNet
Puthumattalan hospital bombing	26 March 2009	Puthumattalan, Mullaitivu	5	Army	According to pro-rebel TamilNet
No Fire Zone shelling and bombardment	26-28 March 2009	No Fire Zone, Mullaitivu	179	Army	According to pro-rebel TamilNet
No Fire Zone shelling	27 March 2009	No Fire Zone, Mullaitivu	61	Army	
No Fire Zone shelling	28 March 2009	No Fire Zone, Mullaitivu	51	Army	
No Fire Zone shelling and bombardment	29 March 2009	No Fire Zone, Mullaitivu	53	Army	According to pro-rebel TamilNet
Indiscriminate attacks at Mullaitivu	30 March 2009	Mullaitivu	88	Army	According to pro-rebel TamilNet
Cluster bombing of No Fire Zone	31 March 2009	Mullaitivu	45	Army	According to pro-rebel TamilNet
Killing of 12 pregnant mothers	March 2009	Mullaitivu	12	Army	According to pro-rebel TamilNet
Indiscriminate attacks on No Fire Zone	1-3 April 2009	Mullaitivu	90	Army	According to pro-rebel TamilNet
Indiscriminate attacks on No Fire Zone	5 April 2009	Mathalan, Pokkanai, Valaignarmadam, Iraddaivaikkal, Mullaitivu	71	Army	According to pro-rebel TamilNet
Pokkanai shelling	7 April 2009	Pokkanai, Mullaitivu	20	Army	
Primary Health clinic shelling	8 April 2009	Pokkanai, Mullaitivu	50	Army	
No Fire Zone shelling	8 April 2009	No Fire Zone, Mullaitivu	60	Army	
Indiscriminate attacks at Pokkanai and Valaignarmadam	13 April 2009	Pokkanai and Valaignarmadam, Mullaitivu	47	Army	According to pro-rebel TamilNet
No Fire Zone Shelling	12 April 2009	No Fire Zone, Mullaitivu	31	Army	According to pro-rebel TamilNet
Indiscriminate attacks at Valaignarmadam and Mullivaikkal	13 April 2009	Valaignarmadam and Mullivaikkal, Mullaitivu	23	Army	According to pro-rebel TamilNet
Indiscriminate attacks on civilian zone in Mullivaikkal and Pokkanai	15 April 2009	Mullivaikkal and Pokkanai, Mullaitivu	180	Army	According to pro-rebel TamilNet
Shelling of No Fire Zone	16 April 2009	Iraddaivaikkal, Mullivaikkal and Pokkanai, Mullaitivu	57	Army	According to pro-rebel TamilNet
Pokkanai shelling	19 April 2009	Pokkanai, Mullaitivu	4-5	Army	
Shelling of Iraddaivaikkal and Mullivaikkal	19 April 2009	Iraddaivaikkal and Mullivaikkal, Mullaitivu	60	Army	According to pro-rebel TamilNet
Shelling of Mathalan and Pokkanai	20 April 2009	Mathalan and Pokkanai, Mullaitivu	300	Army	According to pro-rebel TamilNet
Valayanmadam makeshift hospital bombing	21 April 2009	Valayanmadam, Mullaitivu	4-5	Air Force	
Mass killing of civilians at Puthumathalan	April 2009	Puthumathalan, Mullaitivu	1,500+	Army	
Valayanmadam shelling	23 April 2009	Valayanmadam, Mullaitivu	10	Army	
Mullivaikkal Hospital bombings	23 April-12 May 2009	Mullivaikkal, Mullaitivu	100+	Army, Air Force	
Iraddayvaikkal and Mullivaikkal bombing	28 April 2009	Iraddayvaikkal, Mullivaikkal, Mullaitivu	29	Air Force, Navy	
Mullivaikkal makeshift hospital bombing	29 April 2009	Mullivaikkal, Mullaitivu	9	Army	According to pro-rebel TamilNet
Indiscriminate attacks at Mullivaikkal	29 April 2009	Mullivaikkal, Mullaitivu	300	Army	According to pro-rebel TamilNet
Indiscriminate shelling at Mullivaikkal	1 May 2009	Mullivaikkal, Mullaitivu	27+	Army	According to pro-rebel TamilNet
Mullivaikkal makeshift hospital bombing	2 May 2009	Mullivaikkal, Mullaitivu	68	Army	
Valayanmadam makeshift hospital bombing	8 May 2009	Valayanmadam, Mullaitivu	4-5	Army	
Indiscriminate shelling at Mullivaikkal	8 May 2009	Mullivaikkal, Mullaitivu	45+	Army	According to pro-rebel TamilNet
Indiscriminate attacks at Mullivaikkal	10-12 May 2009	Mullivaikkal, Mullaitivu	2,600+	Army	According to pro-rebel TamilNet
Mullivaikkal makeshift hospital bombing	12 May 2009	Mullivaikkal, Mullaitivu	47	Army	
Mullivaikkal makeshift hospital bombing	13 May 2009	Mullivaikkal, Mullaitivu	100+	Army	According to pro-rebel TamilNet
Massacre of civilians at Mullivaikkal	15 May 2009	Mullivaikkal, Mullaitivu	Hundreds killed	Army	According to pro-rebel TamilNet
Indiscriminate attacks at Mullivaikkal	16 May 2009	Mullivaikkal, Mullaitivu	100+	Army	According to pro-rebel TamilNet
17–19 May 2009 disappearances of Tamils in Army custody	17-19 May 2009	Mullaitivu	500	Army	
Massacre of civilians at Mullivaikkal	18 May 2009	Mullivaikkal, Mullaitivu	Spree of massacres	Army	
Mulivaikal massacre (2009)	May 2009	Mullivaikkal, Mullaitivu	40,000–70,000	Largely Army; LTTE	
Gun Site killings of Tamil-speaking youths	late May 2009	Trincomalee Naval Base	11	Navy	
Welikada prison riot	9-10 November 2012	Welikada Prison	27	Police (STF), Army	
Weliweriya Protestors' Attack	1 August 2013	Weliweirya, Gampaha	3	Army	
2019 Sri Lanka Easter bombings	21 April 2019	Colombo, Batticaloa, Negombo	269	NTJ, ISIS	
Mahara prison riot	29 November 2020	Mahara	11	Police	
Nigambo prison riot	6 July 2026	Nigambo	11	Police	
