= Veeramunai massacres =

1990 Massacres

- Veeramunai (Sri Lanka)
- Location: Veeramunai, Ampara District, Sri Lanka
- Date: June 20 – August 15, 1990
- Attack type: Massacre
- Weapons: Guns, knives.
- Deaths: 250+ Tamil civilians
- Perpetrators: Sri Lankan security forces, Muslim home guards

The Veeramunai massacres were the mass killing and disappearances of over 250 Tamil civilians by Sri Lankan security forces and Muslim home guards in 1990.

== Background ==
Veeramunai is a rural village in the Ampara District situated within the Eastern Province of Sri Lanka. Most of the 4000 residents were Sri Lankan Tamils and were farmers. On 15 April 1954, a Muslim mob from neighbouring Sammanthurai (population size ~ 40,000) burned down nearly every house in Veeramunai after a Muslim magistrate was stabbed trying to settle a drunken quarrel between two Tamil men in Veeramunai. Following this incident about 75% of the displaced villagers left Veeramunai, and set up satellite settlements like Malwattai, Veerachcholai, and 4th and 19th colonies away from Sammanthurai. Veeramunai land holdings were eventually sold to the residents of Sammanthurai at a low price thus the village reduced in size and population considerably, turning Veeramunai into a Tamil enclave. Following this, it has been claimed that some Muslims harbored a desire to repeat what had happened in 1954 and wipe out the village of Veeramunai completely.

== Prelude ==
Peace talks between the Liberation Tigers of Tamil Eelam (LTTE) and the Government of Sri Lanka, which began in 1989 broke down ending a 13-month ceasefire.

According to North East Secretariat on Human Rights (NESOHR), on June 10, 1990, Muslim groups with the help of the security forces massacred 37 Tamil civilians in Sammanthurai.

On June 11, the LTTE massacred over 600 Sinhalese and Muslim police officers who had surrendered to them in the Eastern Province.

Following the outbreak of Eelam War II on June 11, Tamils were attacked and chased away from Ampara Town and the interior villages around the Gal Oya scheme.

== List of attacks ==
The following is a breakdown of events by UTHR-J and NESOHR:

=== June ===
On June 18, 13 Tamil civilians were abducted by the army from the roads of Veeramunai and made to disappear.

On June 20, the Sri Lanka Army gathered the residents of Veeramunai village and instructed them to assemble at the Veeramunai Pillaiyar temple. Those who stayed at home were shot and killed. Later that day, the military descended upon the temple in large numbers. Over 1,000 villagers had gathered at the temple following the army's orders. The military singled out every male over the age of 15 among them. 69 young men, all of them civilians, were detained right before their families' eyes. The abducted men were transported to the Sammanthurai Marjan Muslim School, where they endured torture. 50 of them lost their lives, and their bodies were disposed of in a nearby forest.

On June 29, the army took a further 56 boys from the Veeramunai temple with the assistance of Muslim home guards. All of the boys subsequently disappeared. In the aftermath of these two incidents, those displaced from the temple sought refuge at the Karaitivu Maha Vidyalayam School.

=== July ===
On July 3, the military once again rounded up individuals from this school, this time taking 11 young men, who also disappeared.

On July 4, the military once again rounded up individuals from the refugee camp.

On July 5, a further 13 men were abducted by the military, subjected to torture, and subsequently killed, their bodies set ablaze with tires. Attempts by people to locate and inquire about the fate of the arrested individuals were met with military attacks. Consequently, these displaced individuals moved once again, seeking refuge at a camp near Veeramunai.

On July 8, an army officer delivered a speech to the refugees telling them that they had finished off the JVP with burning tires, and that they would do it again. He also said that there were no longer any males left living between the ages of 15–50 in Mankulam and another village. He then proceeded to pick up young boys from the camp, most of them sickly and scrawny looking.

On July 10, the military abducted another 15 young men from the refugee camp. These men were transported to a military camp, where they faced torture, followed by execution, with their bodies burned afterwards.

On July 11, 13 women visited Savalakkadai to search for their disappeared children. The army stationed there took the women and they also disappeared.

On July 16, eight women who had ventured from the refugee camp to check on their homes were arrested at the Malwattai checkpoint. They were gang raped by more than 30 Sri Lanka Army soldiers after which they were killed and their bodies set on fire.

On July 26, the military once again arrested 32 young men, including 23 schoolchildren. All of them disappeared.

On July 29, eight school teachers who were traveling with their families from the Veeramunai refugee camp were also arrested, and they too disappeared.

=== August ===
On August 1, 18 civilians, including four women and a baby, were arrested by the military and home guards while passing through the Savalakkadai road. They were killed by sharp weapons, and their bodies were disposed of inside the Savalakkadai temple and set ablaze.

On August 12, following the knifing and serious injuring of two Muslim farmers by the LTTE in Veerachcholai, Muslim anger was stirred. Muslim home guards entered the Veeramunai refugee camp and launched an attack on its residents with knives and guns. This resulted in the deaths of at least ten civilians, including the temple manager Thambimuthu Sinnathurai and two infants. One child's corpse was cut into three pieces. Many others were injured in this attack. Those injured were initially denied treatment at the Sammanthurai hospital by a Muslim crowd and a child subsequently died due to it being refused water. The injured eventually had to be transported to the Ampara hospital. However, the military arrived at the hospital and abducted three of the seven victims who were admitted. In particular, one Muslim soldier called Lateef terrorised the Tamil patients and caused several to disappear. He disconnect the saline drip to one injured boy, Kanthakuddy (17), who subsequently died. The remaining four patients managed to escape back to Veeramunai.

== Aftermath ==
Throughout these events, approximately 600 houses in Veeramunai were set ablaze, and an additional 1,352 houses in neighboring villages, including Malwattai, Mallihaithivu, Newtown, Ganapathipuram, Valaththapiddy, and Sammanthurai, were also set on fire.

Between June 20, 1990, and August 15, 1990, over 250 people from Veeramunai and nearby villages were killed or disappeared, and more than 2,000 houses were burnt.

Tamils were expelled en masse from southern Ampara District and the well watered fertile areas of its west. In particular, Muslim home guards violently expelled Tamils from Veeramunai and Sorikalmumai further outwards to the coast.

Between June and October 1990, 3000 Tamil civilians had been killed or disappeared in Ampara District alone.

In October 1990, the LTTE expelled Muslims from the Northern province, in what Yogi, the LTTE's political spokesman claimed was carried out in retaliation for atrocities committed against Tamils in the Eastern Province by Muslims, who were seen by the LTTE as collaborators with the Sri Lanka Army.

== See also ==
- List of attacks on civilians attributed to Sri Lankan government forces
- Kalmunai massacre
- Role of the Sri Lankan Home Guards in the Sri Lankan Civil War
