= Role of the Sri Lankan Home Guards in the Sri Lankan Civil War =

Civilian Casualties attributed to Sri Lankan Home Guards
- Location: The Following Districts in Sri Lanka: Mullaitivu; Trincomalee; Ampara; Batticaloa
- Date: 1984-2006
- Target: Sri Lankan Tamil civilians
- Attack type: Ethnic cleansing, mass murder, mass arrest, collective punishment, forced displacement, rape, torture
- Deaths: 1,578+ Tamil civilians killed
- Injuries: 106+ Tamil civilians injured
- Perpetrators: Sri Lankan Armed Forces, Sinhalese Home Guards, Muslim Home Guards, Sri Lankan Police, Sri Lankan Navy

The Sri Lankan Home Guards were a paramilitary organization that played a significant role in the local security apparatus during the Sri Lankan civil war from 1983 to 2009. Over the course of the conflict, the Home Guards evolved from a poorly equipped self-defense force into a state-organized and armed unit that worked closely with the police and military.

The new emergence of the auxiliary forces such as the Home Guards began as the direct results of the broader rising ethnic conflict and the states response to the protest. The government relied on these locally recruited defense groups to help support the formal military regime and continue to have control over their territories, especially as violence became increasingly overwhelming in the border regions.

However, their operations remained controversial: In addition to their role as a security force, the Home Guards were repeatedly accused of human rights violations, involvement in ethnically motivated violence, and other atrocities.

Reports from the Human Rights Watch and Amnesty International document allegations stated that many of the members of the Home Guards were a part of the defensive attacks on civilians, in particular those that were in ethnically mixed regions. These reports assert that poor training, very little oversight, and unorganized command structure led to the patterns of abuse. With the end of the civil war in May 2009 and the reorganization of state security structures, large parts of the Home Guards were integrated into the Civil Security Department system, and the Muslim Home Guard unit was disbanded. The addition of the Home Guards into the formal national security department was a result of the port-war efforts to centralize the auxiliary forces, however this action raised concern regarding accountability in human rights reporting.

== Background ==
The Home Guards in Sri Lanka were local auxiliary units established in 1984 and formalized into the National Home Guard Service under the Mobilization and Supplementary Forces Act, No. 40 of 1985, which creates the legal framework for establishing and administering supplementary forces, reserves and other civil defense formations. However, the Home Guards initially existed as an unarmed force, since September 1981. Although Home Guards were presented as local auxiliaries protecting Muslim villages from communal and insurgent violence, the Government also relied on them to support the army and maintain control over contested territory. These units operated as lightly armed, village-based defense detachments often under local police oversight. Muslim Home Guards began assisting in massacres in December 1985.

In February 1986, the Sri Lankan government began establishing units composed exclusively of Muslims in Batticaloa District. Uthayan reported by 20 March 1986, 75 Muslims had been appointed to an armed Home Guard unit in Kattankudy. The unit received firearms and grenades in the presence of police officials and Batticaloa Member of Parliament Hisbullah Chinnalebbe. On 6 April 1986, a follow-up article in Uthayan detailed concerns over Home Guard discipline and conduct, noting that Home Affairs Minister K. W. Devanayagam had requested the return of their weapons after reports of robbery, violence and indiscipline. He attributed some of the incidents to inadequate training, noting that even trained security-force personnel sometimes engaged in misconduct.

The LTTE leader described the Home Guard as a government tool intended to divide Tamil-speaking communities by exacerbating the social, religious, and class differences that exist among Tamil-speaking people. It accused Home Guard members of killing civilians, humiliating residents, and looting property, while condemning Muslims who joined the force as collaborators or tools of the enemy.

In 2006, the Home Guard system underwent a major reorganization. Through a government gazette No. 1462/20 of 13 September 2006, the Home Guard Service was reorganized as the Civil Security Department (CSD) and placed within the Ministry of Defense. The reorganization aimed to standardize training, command structures, and pay for the auxiliary force to integrate it more closely with national security institutions.

The Muslim Home Guards were primarily deployed in areas territorial control was constantly challenged. This situates the role of the Home Guards within the wider context of the Sri Lankan Civil War (1983–2009), which was marked by widespread violence with numerous massacres targeting Tamil civilians. These incidents are part of a larger history of ethnic conflict between the Tamil minority and the Sinhala majority, intensified by the rise of the Tamil Tigers (Liberation Tigers of Tamil Eelam, LTTE), a separatist group seeking autonomy. Major incidents of violence during this period are summarized below to illustrate the scale and nature of violence directed against Tamil communities.

The Sri Lankan judicial system has not prosecuted nor pursued legal proceedings against members of the Home Guards alleged to have participated in attacks on Tamil civilians. Across multiple phases of Sri Lanka's civil conflict, allegations involving actors aligned with the state have rarely turned into an investigation beyond initial reporting, resulting in a persistent gap between public reporting and judicial action. This absence of accountability has been noted as part of a broader, long-standing pattern of impunity.

The Sri Lankan Home Guards operated with official support, including arms and training provided by the Sri Lankan military, and frequently acted in coordination with state forces. This collaboration contributed to a series of massacres and systematic attacks on Tamil villages, particularly in the eastern districts; namely Trincomalee, Ampara, Batticaloa.

Following the burning and destruction of Karaithivu in the Ampara District between April 12 and 14, 1985 carried out by Jihad members brought from Colombo and Muslim mobs from neighboring villages, an attack was launched on the Muslim market in Sammanturai on the night of April 14 by unidentified individuals. At the same time, Tamil-owned shops in the market were also affected, and properties belonging to both communities were burned. Over the following three weeks, the violence escalated into a one-sided ethnic violence that spread to nearby Tamil towns and Tamil neighborhoods in Batticaloa. Thousands of Tamil homes were set on fire. Following the attacks on Muslims, Lalith Athulathmudali expressed concern; while on May 3rd, A. M. H. Mohamed demanded that weapons be provided to the Muslims.

Sri Lankan political observers have questioned how much Mr. Athulathmudali and the government knew about the arming of the Jihad members, particularly in the context of Mr. Athulathmudali’s remarks in an interview with The Island. His Cabinet colleague, Transport Minister Mr. M. H. Mohamed, made a similar argument at a press conference in London on April 30 saying that ‘the Sri Lankan government must release arms to Muslim civilians in villages to enable them to defend themselves against Tamil militants’. These arguments appeared to provide a basis for justifying the Sri Lankan government’s provision of arms to the people, so long as those weapons were used against the Tamils.

== Attacks in Chronological Order ==
Attack	Date	Location	Death Toll	Injuries, Vulnerable Victims & Property Damages	Perpetrators	References
Massacre of 18 Tamil fishermen	9 December 1984	Mullaitivu	18		Sinhalese Home Guards	
Madawachchiya massacre	11 December 1984	Madawachchiya	65	Women were victims of rape	Sinhalese Home Guards	
1985 Trincomalee massacres	May – September 1985	Several places in Trincomalee	280+		Army, Sinhalese Home Guards, Navy	
Murugapuri massacre	8 September 1985	Murugapuri Trincomalee	3		Army, Sinhalese Home Guards	
Nilaveli massacre	16 September 1985	Nilaveli, Trincomalee	40		Army, Sinhalese Home Guards	
Kalvettu massacre	20 September 1985	Kalvettu, Ampara	15	10 injured	Sinhalese Home Guards	
Sampur massacre	27 November 1985	Sampur, Trincomalee	21	8 injured, 165 houses burned	Army, Sinhalese Home Guards, Navy	
Anpuvalipuram Road shooting	10 December 1985	Anpuvalipuram, Trincomalee	0	2 Tamil children injured and hospitalized	Sinhalese Home Guards	
Rape and murder of 2 Tamil women in Muthur	25 December 1985	Muthur, Trincomalee	2	2 women raped	Muslim Home Guards	
Akkaraipattu massacre	19 February 1986	Akkaraipattu, Amparai	80	5 women raped	Army, Muslim Home Guards	
Seruvila massacre	12 June 1986	Seruvila, Trincomalee	21	2 aid workers Injured	Sinhalese Home Guards	
1986 Thambalakamam massacre	28 June 1986	Thambalakamam, Trincomalee	34		Sinhalese Home Guards	
Mollipothana massacre	10 July 1986	Mollipothana, Trincomalee	11		Sinhalese Home Guards	
Peruveli refugee camp massacre	15 July 1986	Peruveli, Trincomalee	48	20 injured, many women raped	Army, Sinhalese Home Guards	
Sammanthurai massacre	10 June 1990	Sammanthurai, Amparai	37		Army, Muslim Home Guards	
Veeramunai Massacres	20 June 1990 – 15 August 1990	Veeramunai, Amparai	250+	2,000 homes and a Hindu temple set on fire	Muslim Home Guards	
Kalmunai massacre	10 July 1990	Kalmunai, Amparai	31		Army, Muslim Home Guards	
Tiraikerny massacre	6 August 1990	Tiraikerny, Amparai	54+	Victims included women and children	Muslim Home Guards	
Xavierpuram massacre	7 August 1990	Alikampai, Amparai	7	1 disappeared, 12 badly injured; houses, church and school burned	Muslim Home Guards	
Rev Fr. Eugene John Hebert and Betrum Francis (His Driver)	15 August 1990	Eravur, Batticaloa	2		Muslim Home Guards, Army	
Eastern University massacre	5 September 1990	Vantharumulai, Batticaloa	158		Army, Muslim Home Guards	
Sathurukondan Massacre	9 September 1990	Sathurukondan, Batticaloa	205	5 infants, 42 children below the age of 10, 9 pregnant women and 28 seniors that were over 68 were victims of this attack	Army, Muslim Home Guards	
Savukkadi massacre	20 September 1990	Savukkadi, Batticaloa	33	10 children and an infant were burnt to death.	Army, Muslim Home Guards	
Thalavai massacre	20 September 1990	Thalavai, Batticaloa	9+		Army, Muslim Home Guards	
1990 Puthukkudiyiruppu massacre	21 September 1990	Puthukkudiyiruppu, Batticaloa	17	Victims included women and children. Serious injury of 27 others	Muslim Home Guards	
1990 Valaichchenai massacre	22 December 1990	Valaichchenai, Batticaloa	9		Sinhalese Home Guards	
1991 Eravur massacre	20 February 1991	Eravur, Batticaloa	6	25 seriously wounded injured	Sinhalese Home Guards	
Polonnaruwa Massacres	April 29, 1992	Muthugal and Karapola	89+	13 children under the age of 10 were victims of this attack	Sinhalese Home Guards	
4th Colony village massacre	24 September 1997	Amparai	Between 8 and 15		Sinhalese Home Guards	
1998 Tampalakamam massacre	1 February 1998	Tampalakamam, Trincomalee	8		Sinhalese Home Guards, Police	
2006 Trincomalee massacre of NGO workers	4 August 2006	Muttur, Trincomalee	17		Army, Muslim Home Guards, Navy	

== The Deployment and Expansion of the Home Guards ==
By 1987, Human Rights Watch estimated that around 11,000 Home Guards were active in the Northern and Eastern provinces. The Home Guard system continued to expand, reaching approximately 22,000 personnel by early 1991 and operating under police supervision to protect villages. By 1994, at least 17,000 Home Guards were stationed at security points across the island in peacekeeping and law-enforcement support roles. More than 20,000 Home Guards were also involved in election security measures in 2002. Following the 2006 restructuring of the Home Guard Service under Gazette Notification No. 1462/20, which established the Civil Security Department (CSD), the force expanded rapidly and by early 2009, an estimated 45,000 predominantly Sinhalese villagers belonged to the Civil Security Department.

Most of the massacres carried out by the Sri Lankan Home Guards were predominantly concentrated in the eastern districts, specifically in Trincomalee, Amparai, and Batticaloa, which were known for their agricultural productivity and access to coastal trade routes. Alongside these eastern districts, Mullaitivu in the Northern Province also experienced significant violence which served as a key LTTE stronghold.

In the eastern districts, Tamil populations often lived as minorities amongst Muslim communities. Notably, these regions experienced frequent incidents of communal violence. Home Guards, operating in coordination with Sri Lankan state security forces (local police and army), are reported to have played a vital role in exacerbating tensions and conducting operations aimed at destabilizing and damaging Tamil-Muslim relations, in order to assert control over the contested territories.

In December 1984, the Sri Lankan government authorized the relocation of roughly 200,000 individuals from the southern part of the country to predominantly Tamil‑populated areas. A portion of these settlers were recruited as home guards and supplied with shotguns and automatic weapons under the guise of local self‑protection. These armed units have been accused of serious human rights abuses against Tamil civilians and are considered to operate beyond the authority of the police and security forces.

=== Weli Oya “System L” ===
The Sri Lankan Home Guards have been instrumental in altering the demographic landscape of Tamil-speaking areas; acting as a vanguard for colonization. While their official function is defensive, they actively expand colonized areas by attacking nearby Tamil villages and are used as a first line of defence by the military to protect army camps and consolidate power in areas captured by the armed forces.

The strategy of using the Home Guards is part of a broader state-sponsored colonization effort, which includes schemes like Weli Oya that settled Sinhalese farmers on lands formerly populated by ethnic Tamils. The Mahaweli Authority backed this effort by systematically arming the settlers, using schemes such as System L in Weli Oya to advance frontier militarization. This approach aimed to alter the demographic balance of the Northern and Eastern Provinces, effectively changing the region's composition in favour of the majority Sinhalese population.

Based on the expertise of two leading scholars of Sri Lanka’s militarized settlement programmes, the evidence shows the extent to which the Home Guard model spread through frontier settlements. Rajesh Venugopal, an LSE associate professor who specializes in the politics of development and ethnic conflict in South Asia notes that about half of the families in the region have at least one member serving as a Home Guard or army infantry; his estimates are regarded as reliable indicators of how deeply the Home Guard became entrenched at the frontline of this conflict. His research on the Weli Oya “System L” settlement further reveals that nearly 75 per cent of adult males there were enlisted as Home Guards.

Similarly, Robert Muggah, a fellow at the Social Science Research Council (SSRC) with experience mapping armed‑group presence through satellite imagery, security reports and census data, estimates that around 25,000 army infantry personnel and Home Guards were stationed in System L by the late 1990s.

== 1984-2006 ==
Between 1984 and 2006, there were 31 documented incidents involving attacks on civilians, by the Sri Lankan Home Guards a state-sanctioned paramilitary group. Of these, five incidents involving Muslim Home Guards were documented between December 1985 and July 1990. The accumulation of these attacks by Muslim Home Guards and Jihad, the Islamic militant group contributed to a persistent pattern of targeted violence against civilians, creating an environment in which the Kattankudy mosque attack would later occur.

On 3 August 1990, an attack on two mosques in Kattankudy resulted in the deaths of over 100 Muslim worshippers. The massacre was widely attributed to the LTTE, though no public or judicial investigation has conclusively identified the perpetrators. The LTTE also denied its involvement for both these massacres in Kattankudy.

Following the Kattankudy incident, eight additional massacres involving Muslim Home Guards took place between August and September 1990. In parallel with these Home Guard-related attacks, a series of retaliatory massacres led by Muslim mobs occurred in response to the Kattankudy incident. Subsequently, in October 1990, the LTTE expelled the Muslim population from the Northern Province. Reports indicate, this mass displacement significantly strained Tamil-Muslim relations. During this period, the Tamil Tigers gained control of several areas that had previously been contested by government forces and the LTTE.

=== 1990 ===
Reports published by Uthayan in July 1990 described further violence involving Muslim Home Guards and army personnel. On 8 July, the newspaper reported claims that, in Kantalai, 12 Muslims and 12 Tamils suspected of supporting the LTTE had been shot dead and that their bodies were burned with tires. The same report stated that a young woman arrested on suspicion of assisting the LTTE disappeared after being taken to an army camp. It also detailed allegations from the LTTE that Muslim Home Guards and army personnel had burned six Tamil civilians alive using tires in Kinniya. In addition, the report described the looting of homes belonging to displaced Tamils and stated that Tamil villagers in parts of Thambalagamuwa were subjected to harassment and killings, restricting their access to essential supplies.

On 19 July 1990, Uthayan reported that Muslim Home Guards had shot and killed a man named Paramu in the 18th Milepost area of Thambalagamuwa, Kinniya.

In August 1990, Uthayan and Eezhanatham published reports claiming widespread retaliatory violence against Tamil civilians in Sri Lanka’s Eastern Province following the Kattankudy massacre. The reports attributed many of the attacks to Muslim Home Guard personnel, army units, or armed Muslim groups operating alongside state forces.

On 11 August, Uthayan reported that 107 Tamils had been killed in retaliatory violence across the Eastern Province. According to Karikalan, who was the LTTE’s leader in Batticaloa District, 26 Tamils were lined up and shot dead in the Kallaru area, while 12 were killed in Ampara, and a further 12 were killed by Home Guard personnel in Savalakadai. Karikalan denied that the LTTE had been involved in the Kattankudy incident that had prompted the reprisals.

The following day, Uthayan reported that 15 Tamil civilians had been killed by Home Guard personnel in Amparai District on 11 August. The information was announced from Colombo by All India Radio.

Further reports documented an attack in Veeramunai, Ampara District, on 17 August. Uthayan reported that 91 Tamil civilians were shot dead and approximately 125 others seriously injured in that incident. The report claimed that the attack was carried out shortly after weapons had been distributed to local Home Guard personnel and stated that the army transported the wounded to Ampara for medical treatment.

A report published by Eezhanatham described several incidents in Ampara District on 12 August. It stated that an armed Muslim group accompanied by the Special Task Force entered Thuraineelavanai and killed 60 Tamils by hacking, stabbing, and shooting them. The report further stated that Muslim Home Guard personnel entered nearby Senaikudiyiruppu at approximately 5:00 p.m. and shot dead 10 Tamils. At around 5:30 p.m., Sri Lankan Army personnel shot and killed five Tamil youths riding bicycles in Thuraineelavanai and burned their bodies with tires.

On 22 August, Uthayan reported that four Tamils had been burned to death in Thalavai, Eravur, by Home Guard and army personnel. It also stated that 10 civilian boats and eight houses had been burned and destroyed during the incident.

In September 1990, Uthayan and Eezhanatham published further reports of violence, arbitrary detention, and intimidation against Tamil civilians in Sri Lanka’s Eastern Province, involving Muslim Home Guard personnel and, in some cases, the Sri Lankan Army.

On 3 September, Uthayan reported that Muslim Home Guards had killed three Tamil women and injured another in separate incidents. One of the victims, Markandu Arulamma, 35, a mother of three, was killed while traveling between refugee camps; another Tamil refugee woman traveling with her was injured. In a separate incident in Aiyankeni, Batticaloa District, Chellathurai Thangathurai, 45, a mother of six, and Chellathurai Arulamma, 60, were shot dead by Muslim Home Guards.

Uthayan reported on 20 September that, in the prior week, three Tamils from Muttur had been beaten and injured by a Muslim Home Guard while visiting Thoppur to purchase goods. The victims were identified as K. Vairamuthu, 65; Maganthaiya, 76; and Vairavan Muthukumar, 46.

More serious reports were published on 21 September. Uthayan reported that 35 Tamil youths from Sorikalmunai had been arrested, taken to the Savalakkadai army camp, and shot dead by army troops and Muslim Home Guard members. The report also stated that 35 Tamil women sheltering in temples and schools in the Savalakkadai area were detained and subjected to sexual violence by Muslim Home Guard personnel. According to the article, the women subsequently escaped and sought refuge in Mandur.

On 25 September, six Tamil political parties: the EPRLF, ENDLF, TELO, PLOTE, Tamil United Liberation Front, and All Ceylon Tamil Congress called on the Sri Lankan government to disband Muslim Home Guard units in the Eastern Province. They accused the units of killing Tamil civilians and acting as terrorist groups rather than protecting the public. The parties also criticized the government for failing to prevent the abuses and stated that they were negotiating with Muslim leaders to establish a framework for public order intended to prevent attacks on Tamils by Muslim Home Guards.

An article published by Eezhanatham on 27 September reported another incident in Savalakkadai, Batticaloa District. It stated that Sri Lankan Army personnel and Home Guard members shot dead five Tamil farmers on 22 September as they traveled to harvest their paddy fields. The killings prevented other Tamil farmers from reaching and harvesting their own crops.

In October and November 1990, Uthayan and Eezhanatham published further reports of killings, torture, and disappearances involving Sri Lankan security forces and Muslim Home Guard personnel in the Eastern Province.

On 9 October, Uthayan reported that Mrs. Mangaiyarkarasi, the principal of Attappallam Tamil School in Ampara District, had been strangled with a rope by members of the Muslim Home Guard. As a resident of Karaithivu, she had served as the school’s principal for two years.

In an article dated 3 November, Uthayan reported on the following mass killing in the Batticaloa area. On 31 October, army troops and Muslim Home Guard members surrounded Arayampathy and detained 30 Tamil civilians from Arayampathy, Kallady, Thalanguda, Pudukudiyiruppu, and Kirankulam. The civilians were taken to the Arayampathy Army camp, where they were beaten and tortured overnight before being burned alive with tires on the morning of 1 November. The article added that the LTTE attacked the camp at approximately 6:15 a.m. later the following morning, damaging its sentry posts with rocket fire. The army soldiers returned fire and withdrew into the camp.

On 10 November, Eezhanatham reported that Sri Lankan armed forces and Muslim Home Guard personnel who had killed 23 Tamils taken from the Kizhappanbe refugee camp in late October returned to the camp on 7 November. The article stated that they abducted 60 men from the camp in the China Bay area, where displaced civilians had sought refuge after fleeing violence in nearby villages. According to the report, relatives watched and wept as the men were taken away, after which their fate remained unknown.

In December 1990, Eezhanatham and Uthayan reported further abductions, killings, and assaults involving Muslim Home Guard personnel and Sri Lankan security forces in the Trincomalee, Batticaloa, and Ampara Districts.

On 14 December, Eezhanatham reported that 14 Tamils had been abducted by unidentified individuals in Trincomalee town. Those taken included the Muttur postmaster, Gunaseeladas (from Kattaiparichchan), and Raji (from Thambalagamam). Their whereabouts remained unknown. The article also stated that police were conducting frequent roundups in Trincomalee, during which young men and women were taken away for questioning. In separate incidents, three Tamils in the Upparu area of Kinniya and another Tamil at the Kinniya jetty were hacked to death by Home Guard personnel.

Three days later, Uthayan reported that Muslim Home Guard members had hacked two Tamils to death in Thoppur, Trincomalee District, on 14 December. The victims were identified as N. Thambirajah, 24, and T. Vijayasingam, 40, both from the Uppural area.

Further killings were reported in Ampara District. Eezhanatham stated that, at approximately 5:00 a.m. on 17 December, Sri Lankan Home Guard personnel shot and killed three Tamils in Alaiyadivembu, near Akkaraipattu. The newspaper also reported that a Tamil civilian named Thavam, a resident of Vinayagapuram, was shot and killed by members of the Sri Lankan Home Guard on 21 December.

In another incident in Batticaloa District, Eezhanatham reported that 21 Tamils detained by Muslim Home Guard members in the Valaichchenai area had been severely assaulted before being handed over to the Sri Lankan Police. The detainees had been taken into custody on 17 December and were released by the police three days later, on 20 December.

=== 1991 ===
In March 1991, Uthayan reported further arrests, abductions, and killings of Tamil civilians in the Eastern Province, particularly in the Trincomalee and Ampara Districts.

On 10 March, members of the Muslim Home Guard from Thoppur, Trincomalee District, arrested 14 Tamil civilians in the Pallikkudiyiruppu area. At the time of the report, no information had emerged regarding their fate.

Uthayan also reported that, on 3 March, Sri Lankan Army personnel and Muslim Home Guard members entered Tamil homes in Kumburuppitti, Trincomalee District, and hacked five people to death: three men and two women. The victims were identified as T. Karthikesupillai, aged five; V. Kathiravelupillai, 58; S. Muniyandi, 56; K. Uthayarani, 15; and Yogarani, whose age was not given. The article further stated that the two female victims were sexually assaulted before being killed and that the troops looted homes in the area.

Following a bomb blast in the Akkaraipattu area on 24 March, Uthayan reported that Muslim Home Guard members had abducted more than 20 Tamils. The newspaper stated that the blast’s reported death toll had risen from eight to 18 and that the body of one abducted person had been found.

Uthayan reported further attacks on 25 March. In an article dated 29 March, Muslim Home Guard members hacked to death 30 Tamil farmers traveling from Karaithivu to Attaipalam to harvest their crops. On the same day, six Tamil female students traveling from Thambiluvil to Akkaraipattu were abducted, while four other Tamil students were hacked to death.

On 10 April 1991, Uthayan reported that the BBC had stated that three Tamils were killed in Mandur, Batticaloa District. Their bodies were found dismembered and dumped beside a roadside. The report suggested that the Sri Lankan Army personnel and Muslim Home Guard members may have been responsible.

=== 1992 ===
In March and May 1992, Uthayan reported further attacks, abductions, and killings involving Muslim assailants and Muslim Home Guard personnel in the Eastern Province.

On 18 March, in Kattankudy, Batticaloa District, a young man suspected of being a Muslim Home Guard member stopped a bus carrying Tamil passengers and threw a grenade inside. The explosion killed four passengers and injured 18 others. The article also reported that two women traveling on the bus were abducted.

Uthayan subsequently reported the abduction of 13 Tamils in the Paper Town (Kagitha Nagar), area of Valaichchenai on 29 April. In an article dated 5 May, Muslim assailants and Muslim Home Guard members abducted six young women, one elderly woman, four boys, and two girls who had gone to a paper-mill plantation to collect firewood. The group included six students from Valaichchenai Hindu College, whose parents worked at the paper mill. The report stated that one abducted boy escaped with chop wounds and said that the group had been taken to Kavathamunai. Search operations in Kavathamunai and the surrounding forests were unsuccessful.

The following day, Uthayan reported heightened tension in the Batticaloa and Ampara Districts, claiming that Muslims and Home Guard members had issued death threats against Tamils. Tamil refugees living in camps in Trincomalee were also threatened. The article further stated that 78 Tamils had been killed in villages along the Batticaloa–Polonnaruwa border between 28 and 30 April, prompting the mass displacement of local residents.

By 14 May, Uthayan reported that the 12 Tamils still missing after the 29 April abduction near the Valaichchenai Paper Mill were believed to have been killed. The group had originally consisted of 13 people who went to collect firewood; one boy escaped and informed his relatives. The article attributed the abductions and killings to Muslim Home Guard members and again noted that six of the missing victims were female students at Valaichchenai Hindu College whose parents were employed at the paper mill.

In July 1992, Uthayan reported further attacks against Tamil civilians in Batticaloa District involving Muslim Home Guard personnel.

On 7 July, two Tamils were shot dead by the Home Guard in Vantharumoolai. The following day, another Tamil was fatally shot by Home Guards in the Karadiyanaru area, and a young girl was also injured by their gunfire. These incidents were covered in the 10 July issue of Uthayan.

A subsequent report, published on 27 July, described four days of violence attributed to Muslim Home Guards across Batticaloa District. According to the article, the attacks created conditions in which Tamil civilians were unable to move freely through the streets. Three Tamils traveling by bus in Eravur were attacked and injured with knives, while four Tamils in Ottamavadi and one in Kattankudy were slashed and left in critical condition. The report also stated that Muslim Home Guard members attacked and intimidated Tamil residents living in a refugee camp in Valaichchenai.

=== 1995 ===
On 16 August 1995, Uthayan reported that Muslim Home Guard members had looted and burned Tamil homes in Senaikudiyiruppu, Ampara District. According to the article, four houses were completely destroyed by fire and a further 20 were looted. The incident displaced more than 100 Tamils, who sought refuge in Pandiruppu, Thuraineelavanai, and 15th Colony. The reported property damage exceeded 1.4 million rupees.

=== 1998 ===
In January 1998, TamilNet and Uthayan reported the retaliatory killing of two Tamil youths in Veeramunai, Ampara District, following the death of a Muslim Home Guard member during an alleged LTTE attack.

According to the reports, Muslim Home Guard member Mohamed Ali Farook, 21, was killed at approximately 9:30 p.m. on 3 January while guarding electrical transformers near Sammanthurai. The attack was attributed to the LTTE. Later the following night, of 3 January, armed Home Guard members entered a house in Veeramunai and shot two Tamil youths, Muthambi Nithiyanandan, 23, and his cousin Rasaiya Navanathan, 17.

The incident prompted Tamil residents living near Sammanthurai to flee, fearing further reprisals. TamilNet described the Home Guard as an armed auxiliary force operating with the Sri Lankan police in areas affected by conflict, and reported allegations that some Home Guard members were former fighters from the Jihad group, a militant Islamic organizations linked to earlier anti-Tamil violence in the Eastern Province.

Seven Muslim Home Guard members were arrested in connection with the killings. They were produced before Kalmunai Magistrate Anton Balasingham, who ordered that they remain in custody until the following Thursday and appear in an identification parade. However, Nithiyanandan’s father, K. Moothambi, questioned whether the actual perpetrators were among those arrested. TamilNet later reported that he was threatened and warned that he would regret it if anything happened to the suspects.

== Post-May 2009: End of Sri Lankan Civil War ==
On July 4, 2009, a public disarmament event involving Muslim militant groups in Sri Lanka's Eastern Province was held at the Kattankudy Jumma Meera Mosque. The event was conducted in the context of a government-declared amnesty program aimed at encouraging the surrender of arms and reintegration of local militant groups. The event took place at Kattankudy Jumma Meera Mosque on July 4, 2009, afternoon 3:00 p.m, in the presence of the Eastern Deputy Inspector General of Police (D.I.G.) Edison Gunatilake and Provincial Minister M.L.A.M. Hisbullah. Images of the event were later circulated and can be found on the AFP Fact Check website documenting the disarmament event.

At the time of the amnesty, the Sri Lankan Army and Police intensified its security operations in Sri Lanka's Eastern Province during this time to capture three high-profile individuals identified as Police Faiz, Muthur Nizam, and Ruhul Haq; figures who are believed to have played a critical role in the radicalization and recruitment of Muslim youth in the region.

By July 4, 2009, the authorities had already picked up seven suspects, in a series of precision raids led by special police units in Kattankudy and Eravur. One of those raids hit a jihadi hideout where they found two suspects and extensive weapons caches including seven T-56 rifles, SMG weapons, anti-personnel mines, claymore mines, detonators and high frequency communication sets. It was a clear sign of how deeply armed and organized these groups were.

Security officials confirmed that investigations were underway to establish whether the individuals in question maintained affiliations with international extremist networks such as al-Qaeda, as well as identifying potential sources of external funding that may have supported their operations.

== Extensively reported Massacres involving Sri Lankan Home Guards ==
Among the many incidents of violence during the Sri Lankan Civil War, certain massacres involving Sri Lankan Home Guards were documented in detail by journalists, and human rights organisations. These massacres were widely reported, and the evidence provided by eyewitness narratives and independent reports highlights their scale and their long-term impact on inter-ethnic relations. While initially established as a rural defence force to protect Sri Lankan villages from insurgent attacks, the Home Guards increasingly became involved in offensive operations alongside the military. Over time, the Home Guard system became closely tied to operations targeting Tamil civilians. The following are some the most well-known and thoroughly documented cases involving Home Guards, with an emphasis on their historical context, scale and consequences.

=== Impunity and the legacy of violence ===
Despite the availability of witness testimonies, human rights reports, and international attention, several of these incidents were not formally investigated. Observers have noted that this lack of accountability allowed extrajudicial killings and reprisal attacks against civilians to occur with little fear of legal consequence. Below are example cases with witness testimonies.

Civilian testimonies alleging abuses by Sri Lankan Home Guards during the Sri Lankan Civil War, c. 1986.

=== Akkaraipattu Massacre ===
The Akkaraipattu Massacre took place on 19 February 1986 in the village of Udumbankulam. Sri Lankan Army troops, supported by Home Guards, attacked Tamil farm workers while they were performing in daily tasks in the paddy fields, killing at least 80 Tamil farm workers. According to the community leaders of Akkaraipattu, the troops tied the hands of the male farmers and made them sit along the roadside before taking them back to the fields, where they were shot. Several spent ammunition casings were later recovered from the site. In the aftermath of the assault, five Tamil women came forward with reports that they had been raped in the paddy fields during the assault.

==== Testimonies ====
According to the local leaders in Akkaraipattu reported that the victims were threshing paddy when Sri Lankan army troops emerged from the nearby jungle, firing into the air. The men were rounded up, tied and then returned to the fields, where they were executed. Reports indicate that their bodies were piled on top of a harvested, dry rice crop and set on fire, with several used ammunition casings later recovered from the site. In the aftermath of the assault, five Tamil women came forward with reports that they had been raped in the paddy fields during the assault.

=== Peruveli refugee camp massacre ===
Peruveli is a village in the Mallihaithivu Grama Sevakar (GS) division, situated about 1 km east of the Mallihaithivu junction. The Mallihaithivu Grama Sevakar (GS) division is mainly made up of Tamil villages, with only Dehiwatta and Nilapola representing the Sinhalese community. In those Sinhalese villages, the army recruited a large percentage of local residents as Home Guards and supplied them with weapons. Because Tamil and Sinhalese in adjacent villages had good relations, undercover home guards would act as informants for the military.

On 15 July 1986, 48 Tamil civilians sheltering at the Peruveli Government Mixed School in Batticaloa were killed. The school had been converted into a refugee camp in 1985, providing a shelter for villagers displaced by the ongoing conflict. The massacre occurred after neighbouring Tamil villages had already been destroyed, leaving the camp’s occupants unable to flee. Some civilians who had gone outside to check on their homes were also shot. Sri Lankan troops, with the assistance of the Home Guards, surrounded the camp and held their positions throughout the night. When morning broke, they entered the compound and opened fire indiscriminately on the civilians sheltering in the school. In total, 48 people were shot dead, and more than 20 others were wounded; many women were raped during the assault. The attack on the refugees lasted until mid‑day.

==== Testimonies ====
The North-East Secretariat on Human Rights (NESOHR) documented the abuses from the Peruveli refugee camp massacre by collecting survivor testimonies. The following summary of events is based on those reports:

The residents from Mallihaithivu and surrounding villages who were displaced by the Sri Lankan armed forces took refuge in the Peruveli refugee camp. The Sri Lankan army forced their way into the village during the night and rounded up everyone. At sunrise, the Sri Lankan army went into the refugee camp to shot, kill and torture anyone they encountered.

The troops then set fire to the refugee-camp cottages. As the huts burned, people were dragged by the head or legs and thrown into the flames, including individuals who were still alive. Men were pulled from houses; then they were shot, mutilated and dumped them in wells. About 25 bodies were loaded onto a vehicle. Three days later after the massacre, the bodies were returned after being acid disfigured to the point of being unrecognizable.

Survivors discovered that almost every well and pit contained bodies once the army withdrew. Workers who had come to the village for employment were also killed. Those who remained in the refugee camp suffered the worst torture. The survivors who returned to the village were in a tragic state; some were crippled, with broken arms and legs and were unable to walk.

Witnesses describe the brutality as “unimaginable,” noting lasting mental trauma among survivors. Specifically, the person who gave this testimony mentioned he feared a repeat attack and it forced the remaining villagers to abandon the area. The witness added that, they could not bury bodies individually because the corpses were severely mutilated. The person testifying explained that, they could not even touch the bodies.

=== Veeramunai Massacre ===
The Veeramunai Massacres, which occurred between 20 June and 15 August 1990 in Veeramunai village of the Amparai district, resulted in the deaths of over 250 Tamil civilians, and the destruction of more than 2,000 homes in attacks carried out by Sri Lankan forces and Muslim Home Guards. During this period, a local Hindu temple was also set on fire. The attack was part of a broader pattern of retaliation by the Sri Lankan government forces aimed at Tamil villages, which were suspected of supporting the Tamil Tigers. Notably, this was not the first instance of violence in Veeramunai; a similar massacre occurred in 1954, indicating a historical pattern of conflict involving the Tamil population in the area.

==== Testimonies ====
The North-East Secretariat on Human Rights (NESOHR) documented the abuses from the Veeramunai massacre by collecting survivor testimonies and publishing the names of the victims. The following summary of events is based on those reports:

On 20 June 1990, Sri Lankan Army personnel entered Malwaththa and Veeramunai, reportedly opening fire on civilians and burning houses. Many residents from surrounding villages fled to the Veeramunai Temple, which had been converted into a makeshift refugee camp. The army reportedly created a climate of terror, targeting people in their homes, on the road, and in paddy fields. People on their way to work were stopped and killed; with the dead bodies subsequently cremated. Males over the age of fifteen were targeted, with youths and children among those arrested; later taken away under the pretext of questioning. One Sri Lankan army officer was overheard telling an onlooker at the Veeramunai temple that he would "order his men to shoot every man and woman in the area" before detaining some youths.

Survivors described severe physical abuse during detention, with visible bruises and injuries on their bodies providing clear evidence of the mistreatment and torture they were put through. Those arrested were reportedly taken to "Sammanthurai Al-Matjan Muslim School", where they were beaten. Only a small fraction of the detainees survived, with reports indicating that many victims were killed; their bodies burned, and hidden in surrounding areas such as Malaikadu. Muslim Home Guards reportedly covered the remains of the dead with several tractor loads of paddy husks in order to cremate the dead bodies.

Eyewitness accounts also indicate that some of the killings were carried out by armed men in civilian clothing, as they witnessed them abduct people with an army truck and then execute the groups of villagers in nearby forests. Mr. Madasamy Kathirkamamoorthy, who survived the massacre, recounted being tied behind his back and beaten. He stated that many of the victims were seen with blood dripping as a result of this torture and at the end of the assault were forced to organize themselves in a line, before being executed using the machine guns held by the Perpetrators. However, Mr. Madasamy Kathirkamamoorthy's quick thinking helped him survive this massacre. By turning to his side, he avoided fatal injuries, sustaining gunshot wounds only to his arms and legs. As the other victims attempted to get up, they were repeatedly shot until they laid motionless. However, he managed to drag himself away from the scene, slowly moving to safety. The operation resulted in numerous deaths, widespread terror, and forced displacement of the local population.

=== Thiraikeni Massacre ===
In the lead-up to the major wave of massacres occurring in 1990s September, Muslim Home Guards attacked the village of Tiraikerny in the Amparai district on 6 August 1990, killing at least 54 Tamil civilians, including women and children. The attackers used a variety of weapons during the assault, including a spear and a trident removed from the temple's premises, which are traditionally associated with the Hindu deities Murugan and Lord Shiva, respectively, as well as religious tools used in the temple by priests, such as knives, axes, and crowbars. The attackers also set several homes on fire before the assault had even begun. The Tiraikerny massacre is one of many attacks during the period of heightened ethnic violence between Tamils and Muslims in the region.

==== Testimonies ====
The North-East Secretariat on Human Rights (NESOHR) documented the abuses from the Tiraikerny massacre by collecting survivor testimonies and publishing the names of the victims. The following summary of events is based on testimony from a survivor:

In the early hours, Tamil villagers reported hearing the cries of Muslim women, mourning the deaths of several men from their community who had gone to work in the paddy fields at Alimadakadu. Later on in the day, the fellow inhabitants of the village warned that an armed Muslim mob, reportedly heavily armed, was advancing towards Thiraikerny to attack Tamils. The Tamil families in Tiraikerny, including women and children, fled their homes and sought refuge in the Pillaiyar Temple.

A mob of more than one hundred and fifty (150) men, armed with knives, swords, sickles, and clubs, approached the temple, shouting slogans and calling on Muslims to unite to attack the Tamil villagers. The Tamil villagers saw smoke rising from their burning houses. As the attackers neared the Pillaiyar Temple, many of the villagers sought refuge at the Periyathambiran Temple, with the mob following closely behind.

An armoured car carrying six (6) Sri Lankan army soldiers arrived at the temple premises. However, the soldiers did not take part in the attack themselves. Tamil youths pleaded with the soldiers to prevent the imminent attack, but the soldiers reportedly stated that, since Tamils had killed Muslims, the army could not intervene. The soldiers then waved their hands, which the mob interpreted as a signal to begin the assault.

The attackers began to desecrate the temple, taking sacred objects such as the Trident and spear from the sanctum, which were used against the civilians. Men seated on the ground were stabbed and hacked, while women and children were also killed. Many victims attempted to flee through the back, but most did not return alive. Among the dead were entire families, including a young mother, Vijeyaluxmy, and her infant child. Specifically, the husband of the person who gave this testimony was among those who did not survive the massacre.

Witnesses reported that the soldiers’ presence appeared to encourage the attackers, which led some people to wonder whether it was a joint attack of the Sri Lankan Army and the Muslim Home Guards. When gunfire was later heard, the soldiers fled in their armoured car, followed by the mob shouting that “Tigers are coming.” Subsequently, members of the Special Task Force (STF) arrived, firing as they advanced, and drove away the remaining attackers.

When the STF entered the area, they discovered a scene of mass slaughter: dozens of Tamil men, women, and children were dead or mutilated, with blood and flesh scattered all over the temple. The survivors were frozen in shock and the chief of the STF promised protection to the victims. Importantly, the account notes that the Tamil villagers did not fight back.

=== Xavierpuram Massacre ===
Xavierpuram was the name of the settlement where the Kuruvar community lived since the 1950s. The Kuruvar community are of Telugu origin, and worked primarily as agricultural labourers for Muslim farmers, or served as watchmen guarding sugar-cane fields from wild animals. The community did not have any remote connection with Tamil militancy. According to North-East Secretariat on Human Rights (NESOHR) on 7th August 1990 at 11:00 a.m., Muslim Home Guards arrived in Xavierpuram, Alikampai in 18 tractors and other vehicles with the intention to destroy the Kuruvar community’s way of life following an allegation that the LTTE had established contact with them.

The residents were ordered to gather in the village, after which the Muslim Home Guards began attacking Kuruvar men and women. Armed attackers set fire to their homes, the community’s hall, church, and school with petrol and kerosene. Many of their youths were also shot dead. Among those targeted was Alphonsus, an educated Kuruvar man who had trained as a Roman Catholic brother. He was reportedly dragged from his home, taken away, and never seen again. In all 7 were killed and 12 badly injured, before the attackers left at 1:00 p.m. Many of the attackers were known to the community and can be readily identified.

Those who survived the attack fled to Thirukovil carrying the injured. They carried nothing with them and ran with the clothes on their back. Survivor testimonies further state that some survivors later died by suicide, unable to cope with the loss of family members, homes and community institutions. Others returned briefly to retrieve the bodies of the dead and perform funeral rites.

==== Testimonies ====
The North-East Secretariat on Human Rights (NESOHR) documented the abuses from the Xavierpuram massacre by collecting survivor testimonies. The following summary of events is based on testimony from a survivor:

The attackers arrived at around 11 a.m., as the Kuruvar community was about to have its first meal of the day. A convoy of eighteen tractors travelled along Neethai Road, carrying people armed with guns, knives, sticks, clubs, and axes. They ordered the people to assemble before them. The armed attackers were dressed in military uniform, and appeared with ill intention.

The Kuruvar community became agitated, as people hurried to the place where the armed men stood. The person giving this testimony also went to the assembly point with her husband and two children. They were able to identify the men in uniform as Muslim home guards and the others as people from the Akkaraipattu area who had accompanied them.

The Muslim home guards then took her only son, while another guard took Jayaraja, a youth from the same community, and tortured both men. The husband who could not bear to watch his son being tortured stood up in protest as she also cried out; at that moment an attacker armed with a wooden pestle struck her Husband on the chest, causing him to fall unconscious. She ran to her husband and tried to raise his head, but someone else struck her on the head. She recalled blood pouring from her head before she lost consciousness.

People who survived the massacre escaped to Thirukovil, taking the injured with them. They ran with no belongings; and some had gone without a meal since the previous day. It was around 4 p.m., when she regained consciousness at the hospital bed. She tried to recall what had happened to her family, but could not. Her relatives, who had come to see her, said that many people had been killed by the Muslim home guards and the Muslim mobs. They also said that their houses had been set on fire with petrol and kerosene.

Although everyone had fled the village, some were preparing to go back to Xavierpuram to carry out the last rites for the dead, whose remains were lying scattered. Despite being weak, she left the hospital ward, found her husband, who was in equally great pain, and travelled with about 20 men in a tractor owned by one of their tribe. She was horrified to find her only son’s body lying near the canal with bullet wounds and two other bodies lying beside him.

Massana, an elderly woman from the Kurawar tribe in Xavierpuram and another victim of the attack, said that she knew most of the attackers; and that some of them were paddy cultivators in the surrounding area. She said, "They not only killed, maimed, and injured people, but also demolished the church, the school, and the homes of a peaceful community, many of whose members worked in the paddy fields of Muslims."

=== Polonnaruwa Massacres ===
On 29 April 1992, in response to an attack on police posts in Alanchipothana by the Tamil Tigers, two large-scale assaults were launched on the Tamil villages of Muthugal and Karapola by the Sri Lankan Home Guards and policemen. In total, 89 Tamil civilians were killed in this coordinated attack. In Muthugal, 51 people were killed by state-backed Home Guards, among the victims were 13 children below the age of 10. In the neighbouring village of Karapola, another 38 Tamils were killed, marking one of the deadliest retaliatory violence in the region during this period.

==== Testimonies ====
The following summary of events is based on the Amnesty International Report which documented the abuses from the Polonnaruwa Massacres by collecting survivor testimonies and publishing the names of the victims:

More than eighty Tamil villagers from the nearby villages of Muthugal and Karapola were intentionally killed by Home Guards, apparently in retaliation for an alleged LTTE attack on the Muslim village of Alanchipothana on 29 April 1992.

Some Sri Lankan policemen from Karapola joined the Home Guards in Muthugal, where they shot and stabbed dozens of Tamil villagers to death. They then returned to Karapola, where an additional thirty-eight (38) people were allegedly killed. Around 9 am, they went back to Muthugal and continued the killings until approximately 10 am, when the army arrived and forced them to retreat.

One of the victims of this massacre reported, in a residence where a group of Tamils had taken refuge, the eye-witness’ son was shot in the chest by a Home Guard as he stood against the door to prevent the perpetrators from entering. Other eyewitnesses also corroborated his account, and added there were seven further victims including three children aged two, four and twelve documented in this particular incident. Another incident resulted in the deaths of Sivapathy and her three-year-old child, Sinnarasiah Thangeswaran, who were shot as she tried to protect the older children in the household.

Many villagers who had fled Muthugal were later found hiding in paddy fields by Home Guards from Madurangala. According to Amnesty's report, a witness identified as the wife of Peiris Wijayasinghe recalled that a group of Home Guards brought six detainees to their residence in Madurangala. Among them was P. Packiyarajah, a relative of hers, as well as a woman from Muthugal. In a subsequent interview, she provided a detailed account of the events that unfolded that day:

“They asked my husband whether he knew Packiyarajah of Muthugal... My husband then said, '... they are innocent and it is out of fear that they had hidden in the paddy [rice] fields'. The Home Guards then beat my husband with rifle butts and with their hands. Soon afterwards the Karapola policemen came... and they beat all the six men, including my husband, and ordered all of them to get into a white van. They said they were taking them to the Karapola police station.”

Sri Lankan Army personnel from the Welikande army camp allegedly entered the area around 6:30 am,. The reported death toll in Muthugal was fifty-one (51), including thirteen (13) children under the age of ten (10). A list of the names of the fifty-one (51) victims executed in Muthugal and thirty-one (31) of the thirty-eight (38) killed in Karapola in these Massacres, was published by Amnesty International.

== The 1990s Black September Massacres ==
The most concentrated wave of massacres involving Home Guards occurred in September 1990, a period that has come to be known among Tamils as Black September. The trigger for this series of events was the Kattankudy Mosque Massacre. Though attributed to the LTTE, the perpetrators were never conclusively identified through a judicial process. In the weeks that followed, several massacres targeting Tamil civilians were carried out by Muslim Home Guards and Sri Lankan military across the Eastern Province.

=== Eastern University Massacre ===
On 5 September 1990, 158 Tamil civilians sheltering at the Eastern University campus in Batticaloa were killed. These individuals, who had sought shelter from ongoing nearby violence at the University, were rounded up and arrested by the Sri Lankan military and Muslim Home Guards before being executed. Following their arrest, the individuals were forcibly removed from the premises. Given the suspicious circumstance, it is presumed that they were subsequently executed as none of these victims were never seen again, and their bodies were never found. No official investigation or legal proceedings were conducted against those suspected of involvement, leaving the case unresolved.

==== Eastern University Refugee Massacre, Vantharumoolai Testimonies ====
Lecturers at the university provided refuge and raised a white flag at the entrance. According to an eyewitness account documented by UTHR:

“As the army advanced into the villages of Kondayankerny, Sungankerny and Karuvakkerny, they opened fire and began hacking the people, resulting in multiple fatalities. The Army had access to a bulldozer, and it was used to bury the bodies; without any delay in between the killings. The army arrested forty-eight (48) residents from those three villages and forced them to move to the Valaichchenai main road, where they were executed and their bodies buried within the premises of a private property.”

Following the arrest of 138 individuals, the witness himself was detained on his way home and held for nine days, during which he observed the killing of detainees inside the camp. The witness further stated that:

“Over the course of seven days, Eastern University campus had become a shelter for fifty-five thousand (55,000) refugees. On day eight, the army accompanied by Muslim Home Guards advanced into the campus, disregarding the white flag that had been put up. While a member of the army spoke to us, two empty buses came to the campus. With the help of Muslim Home Guards, the Sri Lankan army soldiers ordered the people to line up and picked 138 youths from the camp (subsequently revised up to 158). Families and parents cried out and begged, but the 138 youths were forcibly taken to an unknown location. Later, we visited every army camp to inquire about their whereabouts, but the army denied any knowledge of them.”

Thangamuthu Jayasingam, who served as the officer in charge of the Vantharumoolai refugee camp at the time, later recorded in 2015 that he had spoken to “various national and international persons” and had provided testimony before the Presidential Commission on Missing Persons in 2004. Reflecting on the events, he stated:

“I gave them the names of all the army officers involved in the operation, along with the Army Major General who came to the camp three days later, on 8th September. I am not aware whether any investigations have been conducted since then.”

=== Sathurukondan Massacre ===
The Sathurukondan massacre occurred just four days after the Eastern University massacre and was carried out on 9 September 1990 in Batticaloa. More than 186 Tamil civilians were killed by the Sri Lankan Army, with the support of Muslim Home Guards. Among the victims were five infants, 42 children under the age of 10, 9 pregnant women and 28 seniors. The massacre has been widely cited as an example of state-backed violence in which non-combatant civilians were specifically targeted. The event is also noted for its scale, for the indiscriminate nature of the violence that targeted Tamil civilians, regardless of age or gender.

This particular massacre was investigated by a presidential commission formed in 1997 under President Chandrika Kumaratunga. The probe led by esteemed Sri Lankan judge K. Palakidnar, determined three captains from the Sri Lankan Army to have taken part in the massacre and concluded that there was substantial evidence supporting the allegations. The judge advised President Kumaratunga to bring those accountable to justice. However, the government chose not to follow through on the commission's recommendations.

==== Sathurukondan Massacre, Batticaloa Testimonies ====
A survivor of the Sathurukondan Massacre, Mr. K. Krishnakumar, recounted the events of that day in an interview with TamilNet recorded in 1997: The following summary of events is based on those reports:

On the morning of 20 September 1990, the Sri Lankan army had cordoned off the villages of Sathurukondan, Panichchayadi, Pillaiyaradi and Kokkuvil by 10 am. According to the survivor, four masked men entered the hall at the Sathurukondan Boys’ Town army camp around 7pm and picked him, along with K. Jeevaratnam, C. Sinnaththamby, and T. Kumar. They were escorted to the camp's backyard with the assurance that they will be released after a brief inquiry. Instead, the men were forcibly dragged to a 20-foot by 5-foot pit, surrounded by twenty-five (25) armed Sri Lankan army soldiers.

Mr. K. Krishnakumar was struck with a cudgel and fell face down. As the other three victims cried out in terror, the soldiers gagged and stripped them. Subsequently, they were forced towards the edge of the large pit, where they were slashed with swords. Mr. K. Krishnakumar himself was hurled against a cashew tree and then stabbed in the chest with a long kris knife. Despite, the lost blood, he didn't lose consciousness.

This is when four additional men who were brought to the pit, were also hacked to death and pushed into it. Subsequently, the soldiers brought in two pregnant women, who were stripped naked and tortured, as they had their breasts cut off. The Sri Lankan army soldiers also cut their abdomens open before forcing their bodies into the pit. Additionally, the soldiers brought several other females who were also stripped naked and then proceeded to rape them repeatedly. The soldiers also subjected them to mutilation by severing their breasts; after which at least three of these victims were discarded into a nearby well.

Mr. K. Krishnakumar is the sole survivor of the Sathurukondan massacre who witnessed the execution of others, including the rape and murder of girls, the mutilation of pregnant women, and the burning of bodies with tires. He managed to crawl out during the chaos and later sought help from a passer-by to reach a hospital. His testimony was recorded by the Batticaloa Peace Committee, and detailed the systematic slaughter of 184 to 185 Tamil civilians from Sathurukondan and surrounding villages.

=== Savukkadi Massacre & Thalavaai Massacre ===
The massacre at Eastern University was soon followed by another atrocity only two weeks later. On September 20, 1990, two more massacres occurred in close succession. In total, more than 42 Tamil civilians were killed in this coordinated attack. In Savukkadi, 33 Tamils were killed, among them were 26 villagers, including ten children and an infant, who were burned alive and buried in ditches. The other seven victims were Tamil fishermen who were shot and killed while off the coast near Savukkadi.

In addition to these incidents, in the neighbouring village of Thalavaai in Eravur, Muslim Home Guards entered the Tamil settlement in the early morning hours and woke residents from their homes, claiming they were required to attend a meeting with an army commander. Once the victims were gathered in a forested area, they were executed. More than nine Tamils were killed in this particular attack. The violence continued into the next day in Puthukkudiyiruppu, Batticaloa.

=== 1990 Puthukkudiyiruppu Massacre ===
On 21 September 1990, in Puthukkudiyiruppu, Batticaloa, Muslim Home Guards rounded up 44 Tamil civilians, including women and children and forced them onto the beach; where the victims were attacked with knives and swords. This massacre resulted in 17 deaths while 27 others sustained serious injuries.

== Bibliography & External Links ==
- A major source for the documentation of these massacres is the book Massacres of Tamils, 1956-2008 (PDF). Manitham Publishers. 2009. ISBN 978-81-909737-0-0. Archived from the original on 2025-09-24. The book records 171 incidents over a 52-year period and is based on eyewitness testimonies and collected data. It was co-published by the North East Secretariat on Human Rights (NESOHR) and the Chennai-based human rights trust Manitham.

Independent reports, documentaries and texts

- Sri Lanka's Killing Fields an investigative documentary by ITN/Channel 4
