= Veerachcholai =

- Village
- Location within Sri Lanka
- Coordinates: 7°22′0″N 81°45′0″E
- Country: Sri Lanka
- Province7: Eastern
- District: Ampara

Veerachcholai is a rural village in the Ampara District within the Eastern Province of Sri Lanka. Most residents are Sri Lankan Tamilians, a minority and are farmers.

== History ==
According to local chronicles, Veeramunai was founded by early settlers in a medieval feudal division known as Nadukadu. This took place during the pre-colonial period (prior to 1505 CE). Feudal lords known as Vanniar (resident in the village) controlled large swaths of farmland surrounding the village. These farm holdings led to conflicts with the residents of the larger nearby town of Sammanthurai. A majority of the residents of Sammathurai were members of the Sri Lankan Muslim minority, which added to the conflict.

In 1954, after a local conflict, a mob from Sammanthurai burned Veeramunia. About 75% of the villagers left Veeramunai and set up satellite settlements such as Malwattai, Kanapathipuram and Veerachcholai at a safe distance from Sammanthurai. Veeramunai land holdings were eventually sold to residents of Sammanthurai and, consequently, the village declined in size and population.

During the 1990s, villagers were further disrupted by the insurgency and counter-insurgency operations of the Sri Lankan Civil War. On August 12, 1990, Veeramunai refugees who were taking cover within the Hindu temple at Veeramunai were attacked by Home Guards from Sammanthurai, resulting in the death of 55 civilians. Eventually, the village was resettled by returning refugees.
