= 1985 anti-Tamil violence in Karaitivu =

Attacks on Tamil civilians by state-backed Muslim mobs

- Karaitivu (Sri Lanka)
- Location: 7°22′0″N 81°50′0″E; Karaitivu, Ampara District, Sri Lanka
- Date: 12–14 April 1985
- Attack type: Massacre, arson, rape
- Weapons: Guns, knives, stones, fire
- Deaths: 11 Tamil civilians
- Injuries: 40 hospitalised, several raped, 2000 homes burned, 15,000 rendered homeless
- Perpetrators: Sri Lankan Muslim mobs, Sri Lankan security forces

The 1985 anti-Tamil violence in Karaitivu was a series of organised violent attacks against the Tamil population of Karaitivu, Ampara in Sri Lanka by Sri Lankan Muslim mobs aided by Sri Lankan security forces in April 1985. About 2,000 Tamil houses were burned down and several thousand Tamils were displaced.

== Background ==
The Sri Lankan Muslims are a Tamil-speaking group but they do not identify as ethnic Tamils. The Muslims were caught in the middle of the ethnic conflict between the Sinhalese majority and Tamil minority. Both sides attempted to win over the Muslims. Although all Tamil militant groups pledged their support for the Muslims, only the LTTE was able to gain some Muslim support in the Eastern Province.

Journalist Qadri Ismail visited Karaitivu a month earlier and noted there was no evidence that the Muslims had felt sufficiently threatened to resort to violence. Others accused the Tamil militant groups of extorting and abducting Muslims in the Eastern Province since 1984. Though Tamil militants also extracted money from Tamils in the north, eastern Muslims showed stronger opposition by staging a hartal in the region in early April 1985, which provided the government with an opportunity to incite Muslims against the Tamils. Ismail suggested some of the extortions were done by agents provocateurs.

== Incident ==
From 12–14 April, president J. R. Jayewardene sent M. H. Mohamed and a team of his supporters to attack Tamils in the village of Karaitivu. A mob of 3,000 Sri Lankan Muslim youths from surrounding villages, with the support of the Special Task Force (STF), killed several Tamils, raped several women and burned over 2,000 Tamil homes, rendering 15,000 Tamils homeless. Shops were also looted and several Hindu temples were destroyed including a temple of Pattini, where the idols were broken. According to Ismail, 11 people were killed and 40 hospitalised during the ensuing violence on these three days.

Several politicians including K. W. Devanayagam, the Minister of Home Affairs, accused outside forces of instigating the violence. Minister S. Thondaman told the Cabinet that "7 lorries and 2 jeeps filled with thugs had gone from Colombo to the Eastern Province to provoke trouble." Muslim politician A. L. Abdul Majeed stated that certain politicians were trying to provoke ethnic conflict between the two communities who had coexisted peacefully for centuries and urged Muslims to be vigilant.

== Aftermath ==
Following the Karaitivu violence, Muslims from villages near Karaitivu gave assistance to displaced Tamil victims and both communities desired to restore ethnic harmony. Frank Jayasinghe, a consultant to the International Center for Ethnic Studies, conducted an independent investigation into the 12–14 April violence and reported involvement of some STF personnel. On 17 April 1985, a further 27 Tamil civilians in the area were murdered by the STF. Tamil militants also launched a series of retaliatory attacks on Muslims in the east with the Batticaloa District being the worst affected, although all militant groups denied any involvement.

== See also ==
- List of attacks on civilians attributed to Sri Lankan government forces
- Kalmunai massacre
