= Polonnaruwa massacre =

1992 attacks on civilians in Sri Lanka

- Location: 7°57′N 81°00′E; Polonnaruwa District, Sri Lanka
- Date: 29 April 1992
- Target: Civilians
- Deaths: 157. Among these 95 were by SLA and Muslim homeguards and 62 by LTTE and Tamil villagers
- Perpetrators: Home Guards, Police, Sri Lankan Military, LTTE & Tamil villagers

The Polonnaruwa massacre was a series of attacks on civilians in the villages of Alanchipothana, Karapola, Madurangala and Muthugal in eastern Polonnaruwa District, Sri Lanka on 29 April 1992 which left 157 dead. The massacres were blamed on the Liberation Tigers of Tamil Eelam, Sri Lankan Home Guards and the Sri Lankan Police.

== Alanchipothana ==
At around 12.30am on 29 April 1992 30–40 Tamil Tigers, allegedly aided by Tamil villagers, attacked the Muslim village of Alanchipothana (also known as Allipothana, Alinghipothana and Alinchipotana) in Polonnaruwa district. The first target was a police post on the outskirts of the village. 26 policemen, 12 Home Guards and 35 volunteers were based at the police post. Most of these fled into the rice fields and jungle. The attackers then shot and hacked to death villagers sleeping in their homes.

54 dead bodies, including 25 women and 21 children under 10, were found at the village after the attack. The injured were taken to hospitals in Polonnaruwa, Kandy and Colombo where a further 8 died of their injuries.

== Karapola and Muthugal ==
At around 6am on 29 April 1992 the Home Guards and policemen from Alanchipothana went to the police post at the Tamil village of Karapola and informed the policemen there of the attack on Alanchipothana. The policemen from Karapola and the Home Guards and policemen from Alanchipothana then went to Muthugal, another Tamil village, and shot and hacked to death dozens of villagers. They returned to Karapola where they killed dozens of villagers. Then, at around 9am, they went to Muthugal again and continued their killings.

51 villagers, including 13 children under 10, were killed at Muthugal. 38 villagers were killed in Karapola.

The army camp at Welikande (9 km from Alanchipothana) was informed of the attacks at 6.30am but it took until 10am for the Army to arrive at Muthugal and put an end to the killings. The Home Guards and policemen were chased away.

== Madurangala ==
Some of villagers from Muthugal who had fled the killings were found by Home Guards hiding in ricefields at Madurangala, a Sinhalese village. Six of the Muthugal villagers (five men and one woman) were arrested by the Home Guards. The woman was released but on 30 April 1992 the bodies of the five men plus a man from Madurangala were found in an irrigation canal.

== Victims ==
Tamils of the victims of this massacre have been identified.

=== Karapola ===
31 of 38 victims at Karapola have been identified:

- 1. Annaletchumy, 18
- 2. Annamma
- 3. Iyathurai
- 4. Janakie, 8
- 5. Kandasamy, 35
- 6. Kandasamy
- 7. Kannamma
- 8. Kunjan, 30
- 9. Leelavathie
- 10. Marimuttu
- 11. Muthupillai
- 12. Muttan
- 13. Niranjan
- 14. Palan
- 15. Poomani
- 16. Rasiah, 60
- 17. Retnam
- 18. Saraswathie
- 19. Sarathadevie, 18
- 20. Sinnamuttu, 68
- 21. Sinnathangam
- 22. Sivagnanam, 40
- 23. Sivarubie, 28
- 24. Sivaramanie, 18
- 25. Subakar, 7
- 26. Sudharshan, 7
- 27. Sussiharan
- 28. Thangamma
- 29. Thangarajah, 45
- 30. Thangarajah
- 31. M Thoma

=== Muthugal ===
50 of 51 victims at Muthugal have been identified:

- 1. T. Baabu, 14
- 2. S. Babie, 1
- 3. S. Baliah, 27
- 4. T. Geetha, 14
- 5. K. Gopalapillai, 40
- 6. K. Gopikrishnan, 35
- 7. T. Inpavathy, 8
- 8. K. Kanaganathan, 4
- 9. A. Kandiah, 78
- 10. T. (or K.) Kannagai, 40
- 11. K. Kubendrarajah, 33
- 12. P. Kulendraranee, 35
- 13. S. Lakshimi, 12
- 14. P. Logeswaran, 12
- 15. S. Madanthai, 80
- 16. P. Maheswarie, 29
- 17. S. Mangayarkarasi, 2
- 18. N. Manohanthan, 10
- 19. T. Navamanie, 30
- 20. V. Nethapillai, 80
- 21. V. Nithiyakalyani, 30
- 22. P. Packiyarajah, 37
- 23. T. Panchilakami, 12
- 24. S. Rathees, 4
- 25. T. Ravichandran, 12
- 26. T. Regan, 3
- 27. S. Rubie, 5
- 28. K. Sadasivam, 34
- 29. S. Selvasasie, 3
- 30. S. Sivanesarajah, 40
- 31. S. (or A.) Sivapathy, 32
- 32. S. Sudharshan, 3
- 33. T. Suhenthi, 4
- 34. P. Sulochadevi, 18
- 35. P. Sulochandevi, 30
- 36. Sunderalingam, 28
- 37. K Thangaranee, 21
- 38. Sinnarasiah Thangeswaran, 3
- 39. V. Tharmalingam, 49
- 40. S. Theivanapillai, 70
- 41. V. Theivanayagam, 35
- 42. P. Thiruloganathan, 14
- 43. T. Uthayakumarie, 22
- 44. T. Vasanthakumarie, 13
- 45. T. Vijayakumarie, 15
- 46. T. Vijeyendran, 4
- 47. N. Viswalingam, 7
- 48. P. William Singho, 44
- 49. S. Yogamme, 65
- 50. S. Yogasankaraie, 40

=== Madurangala ===
3 of 6 victims at Madurangala have been identified:

- 1. P. Packiyarajah
- 2. Sundaralingam
- 3. Peiris Wijayasinghe

== See also ==
- List of attacks on civilians attributed to Sri Lankan government forces
- Role of the Sri Lankan Home Guards in the Sri Lankan Civil War
