= Eastern University massacre =

1990 mass murder of Sri Lankan Tamil refugees by the Sri Lankan Army near Batticaloa

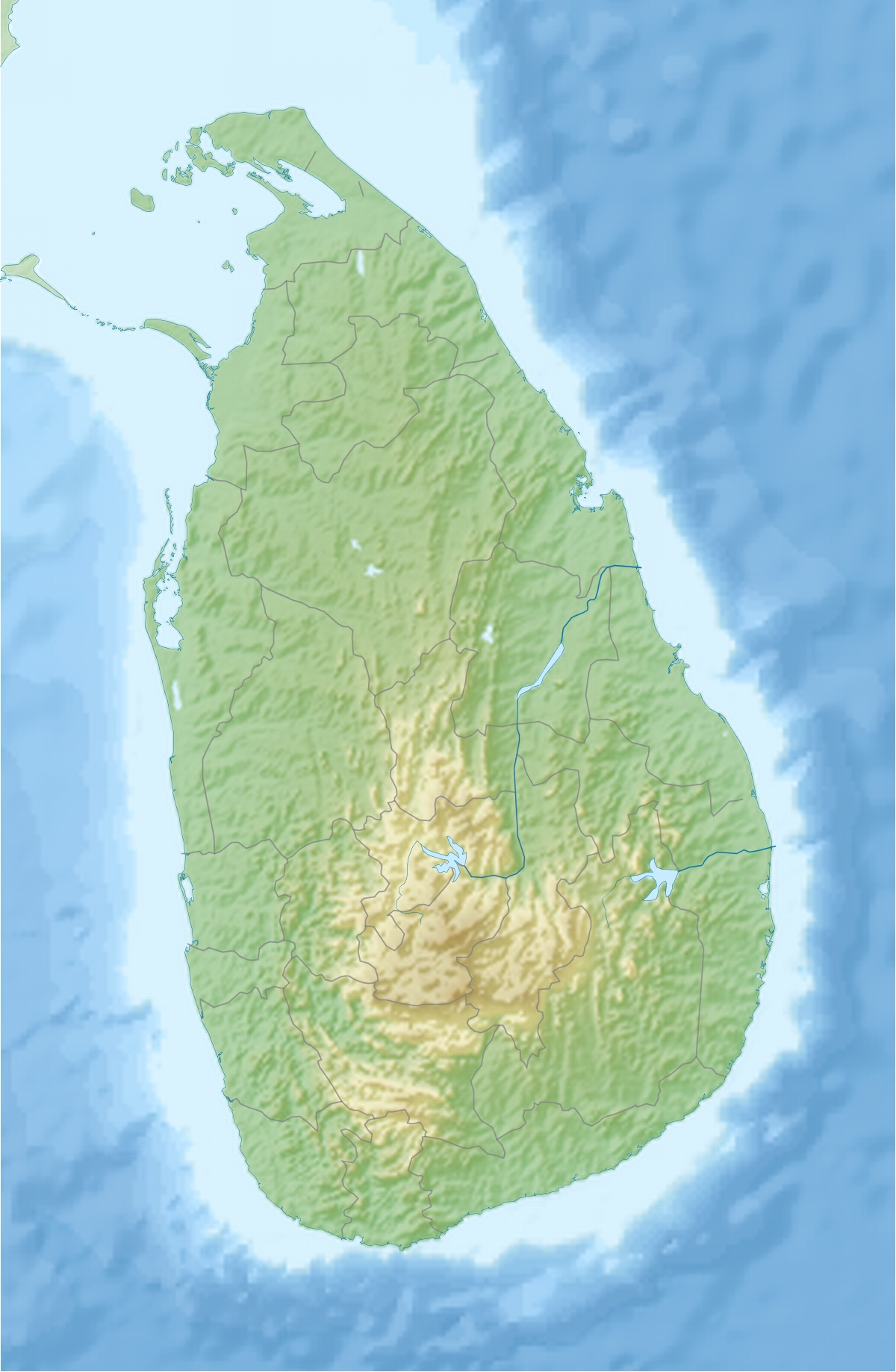
- Location: 7°48′N 81°35′E; Vathharoomulai, Chenkalady, Sri Lanka
- Date: 5 September 1990; 36 years ago (+6 GMT)
- Target: Sri Lankan Tamil civilians
- Attack type: Shooting
- Weapon: Various firearms
- Deaths: 158
- Perpetrator: Sri Lankan Armed Forces

The Eastern University massacre was the arrest and subsequent mass murder of 158 minority Sri Lankan Tamil refugees who had taken refuge in the Eastern University campus close to the city Batticaloa on 5 September 1990. A witness identified Sri Lankan Army personnel as the perpetrators. The event is part of what is known amongst Sri Lankan Tamils as Black September, a series of civilian massacres. The Sri Lankan government eventually established a presidential commission of inquiry. The inquiry found evidence of illegal abductions and mass murder. It also named the responsible parties, but there is currently no evidence of any judicial follow up to the inquiry.

== Background information ==
Following the breakdown of peace talks between the government of Sri Lanka and the Liberation Tigers of Tamil Eelam (LTTE) in 1990, the Sri Lankan military mounted a series of operations against rebel-held territory in Eastern Province, mostly in Batticaloa District. There were a number of massacres and disappearances of civilians attributed to the LTTE, Sri Lankan government forces and government-allied paramilitary groups such as the Tamil Eelam Liberation Organization (TELO), and People's Liberation Organization of Tamil Eelam (PLOTE).

== The incident ==
According to a local human rights agency University Teachers for Human Rights (UTHR), as the Sri Lankan Army personnel from Valaichchenai (see here) camp went into the villages of Vantharumoolai, Sungankerny and Karuvakkerny for a search and destroy mission, people from these villages ran into the Eastern University campus for protection. The lecturers at the campus provided protection for them and hoisted a white flag in front of the University. One eyewitness account, as recorded by UTHR, reports:

"As soon as the army went into the villages of Kondayankerny, Sungankerny and Karuvakkerny they started shooting and hacking the people to death. Wherever they killed people, they lost no time in burying the bodies. The soldiers were equipped with a Bulldozer which made it very easy to bury the bodies. In those three villages – they arrested forty eight (48) people and took them to Valaichchenai main road. There they shot dead all 48 people and buried their bodies in the compound of a private land"

The witness further stated that:

"In seven days, the (Eastern University) campus was full of fifty-five thousand - 55,000 - refugees. On the eighth day, the army walked into the campus ignoring our white flag. Some Tamil (paramilitary operatives) and Muslims home guards collaborating with the army also came with the army. As soon as they entered the campus they asked us as to who were staying here. We told them the people from Valaichchenai and Arumugathan colony were there. While he was talking to us, two empty buses came to the campus. The soldiers ordered the people to come in a line and with the help of those collaborators - they selected hundred and thirty eight 138 (subsequently revised up to 158) youths from the camp. All were ordered to get into two buses. All the parents and family members started pleading and screaming. But they were all taken to an unknown destination. We prepared the names and addresses of all 138 people who were taken by the army. Later we went to all the army camps and inquired about the whereabouts of the 138 people. But the army said that they were not aware of those people."

After witnessing the arrest of 138 people, the witness was arrested on his way home and subsequently released after a nine-day internment in which he personally witnessed the murder of arrestees in the camp.

== Closure of the camp ==
Following the initial arrests, the army arrested 16 more people from the camp the following day. Eventually, the rebel LTTE ordered the authorities to close the refugee camp and ordered all the civilians to move into the nearby jungles. Most refugees thus left the university and became dispersed throughout the surrounding jungle. Many were caught in aerial attacks by the Sri Lankan Air force on purported rebel targets. Surviving refugees from the jungles eventually made their way back to their villages.

== Government investigation ==
The President Chandrika Kumaratunga appointed a three member-Presidential Commission of Inquiry into Involuntary Removal or Disappearances of Persons in the Northern and Eastern Provinces. The Chairman of the Commissioner was Justice Krishnapillai Palakidner. The President signed the warrant on 30 November 1994. The other two Commissioners were L. W. R. R. Widyaratne and W. N. Wilson. The Commission released its final report in September 1997. According to the commission's report, the arrests from the Vantnlaramoolai Eastern University refugee camp were the largest of this District. The arrests took place on 5 September and 24 September 1990. 158 people were arrested on the first day, while 16 others were taken into custody on the second day. A list containing the names of 158 people reported as missing was produced before this Commission and 83 witnesses testified to the disappearances of 92 people out of the 158 reported above. Evidence was also given regarding 10 of the 16 people who disappeared during the subsequent arrest.

According to the evidence, nearly 45,000 people had taken refuge since July 1990 following the outbreak of violence in the vicinity of the university. The refugee camp was administered by Mano Sabaratnam, Thangamuthu Jayasinghan, and Velupody Sivalingam. It was supported by Non-Governmental organizations during this period. On 5 September 1990, by about 09:00, soldiers from Kommathurai army camp, along with personnel from some other army camps, arrived in a government owned bus and entered the premises of the Eastern University. This was followed by an announcement using an amplifier fitted to a white colored van asking the refugees to form into three different queues; people aged 12 to 25 in the first row, people aged 26 to 40 in the second row, and persons over 40 years of age in the third row. People in the three queues were asked to pass through a point where five people clad in masks and army uniforms were seated in chairs along with seven Muslims, standing behind the masked people.

Whenever the people in the masks gave a signal, people in the queues were taken away to the side. When this operation was completed, 158 people who were pulled out from the queues were taken away by the Army despite protest from their kith and kin. There was evidence to show that the arrests were done by the Kommathurai Army camp with the assistance of personnel from other army camps, and that the following Army officers were directing the operations: Capt. Munas, Capt. Palitha, Capt. Gunarathna, Major Majeed and Major Monan. Some of these names are aliases. There was also evidence to show that Gerry de Silva had visited the refugee camp on 8 September 1990 and had told the officers responsible for the administration of the refugee camp that all 158 people taken into custody on 5 September were found guilty. However, he declined to say what happened to them after they were found guilty. There was further evidence showing that one of the officers in charge of the refugee camp made a request to the army personnel in charge of the operations to give a list of persons arrested. However, there was no response.

It also transpired in evidence that Mr Thalayasingam, the Chairman of the Peace Committee, had received a letter in October, 1990 from A. W. Fernando, Air Chief Marshal, who was then the Secretary to the Minister of State for Defence, wherein it stated that on 5 September 1990, only 32 people were taken into custody from the Eastern University Refugee camp, and that all had been released within 24 hours of arrest. The letter contained a list of 32 names of people alleged to have been released. However the Commission was informed that none of those who were arrested had returned either to the said refugee camp or to their homes and still remain missing.

== Day of remembrance ==
The incident and the related massacres of civilians has become an annual event of remembrance in Batticaloa.

== See also ==
- List of attacks on civilians attributed to Sri Lankan government forces
- Role of the Sri Lankan Home Guards in the Sri Lankan Civil War
