= Malwattai =

- Village
- மல்வத்தை
- Location within Sri Lanka
- Coordinates: 7°19′0″N 81°43′0″E
- Country: Sri Lanka
- Province: Eastern
- District: Ampara

Malwattai is a rural village in the Ampara District situated within the Eastern Province of Sri Lanka. Most of the residents are minority Sri Lankan Tamils and are farmers. It was founded in 1954 as village in the jungle by refugees fleeing the burning and destruction of once larger Sri Lankan Tamil village of Veeramunai by some members of Muslim dominant Sammanthurai. Life was affected by the insurgency and counter insurgency operations during the Sri Lankan civil war. Members of the village were also present within the Hindu temple at Veeramunai as refugees when it was attacked by Home Guards from Sammanthurai on August 12, 1990, resulting in the death of 55 civilians. Subsequently, the village was resettled by returning refugees.
