= Veeramunai =

Veeramunai வீரமுனை
- Village
- Location within Sri Lanka
- Coordinates: 7°22′0″N 81°48′0″E
- Country: Sri Lanka
- Province: Eastern
- District: Ampara

Veeramunai is a rural village in the Ampara District situated within the Eastern Province of Sri Lanka. Most of the residents are minority Sri Lankan Tamils and are farmers. According to local chronicles, Veeramunai was founded by early Mukkuva settlers in a medieval feudal division called Nadukadu during the pre colonial period (prior to 1505 CE). Feudal lords known as Vanniar resident in the village controlled large swaths of farm land around the village and the region. These farm holdings led to considerable conflicts with residents of a demographically larger nearby town of Sammanthurai. Most residents of Sammathurai were exclusively members of the Sri Lankan Muslim minority. In 1954, a mob from Sammanthurai burned down Veeramunai after a local conflict. About 75% of the villagers left Veeramunai as refugees and setup satellite settlements like Malwattai, Kanapathipuram and Veerachcholai away from Sammanthurai. Veeramunai land holdings were eventually sold to the residents of Sammanthurai thus the village reduced in size and population considerably. During the 1990s life was affected by the insurgency and counter insurgency operations during the Sri Lankan civil war. Members of the village were also present within the Hindu temple at Veeramunai as refugees when it was attacked by Home Guards from Sammanthurai on August 12, 1990, resulting in the death of 55 civilians. Subsequently, the village was resettled by returning refugees.
