= Karaitivu (Ampara) =

Karaitivu காரைதீவு කාරතීවු
- Village
- Location within Sri Lanka
- Coordinates: 7°22′0″N 81°50′0″E
- Country: Sri Lanka
- Province: Eastern
- District: Ampara
- DS Division: Karaitivu

Karaitivu (Tamil: காரைதீவு, Sinhala: කාරතීවු) is a coastal village situated in the Eastern Coast of Sri Lanka about 30 miles (44 km) south of Batticaloa and is next to Kalmunai town. This is one of the oldest surviving village settlements in the Ampara District.

== Landscape ==
The village has 9–10 square meter area with 4 km long continuous sea boundary on the East and contains paddy lands on the West. Kalmunai, a commercial town with Muslim majority borders the North and Ninthavur, another Muslim dominant village is on its South. The sandy soil beach front extends to about less than 300 meters before a creek of about 20 meters running parallel to the sea and connects the sea almost at the end of the village. Land area further extends from the creek to the West border of paddy lands for a length of one and half km. There are few smaller patches of coconut plantations and vegetable growing area in the south part of the village.

== History ==
Significance of this village in the East is that it is the birthplace of Swami Vipulananda who was credited with reviving the long dormant Tamil and Hindu traditions of the Tamil people throughout Sri Lanka.

The continuing Sri Lankan civil war has adversely affected civilian population of this village resulting in many missing people, preponderance of widows and lack of development and employment opportunities.

The village also took a direct hit from the 2004 Tsunami resulting in the destruction of over 50% of the village and the deaths of over 2,000 people. Most farming and fishing related families lost all the required equipment to continue on with their professions.
