= Sammanthurai =

Sammanthurai சம்மாந்துறை සමන්තර සම්මාන්තුරේ
- Town
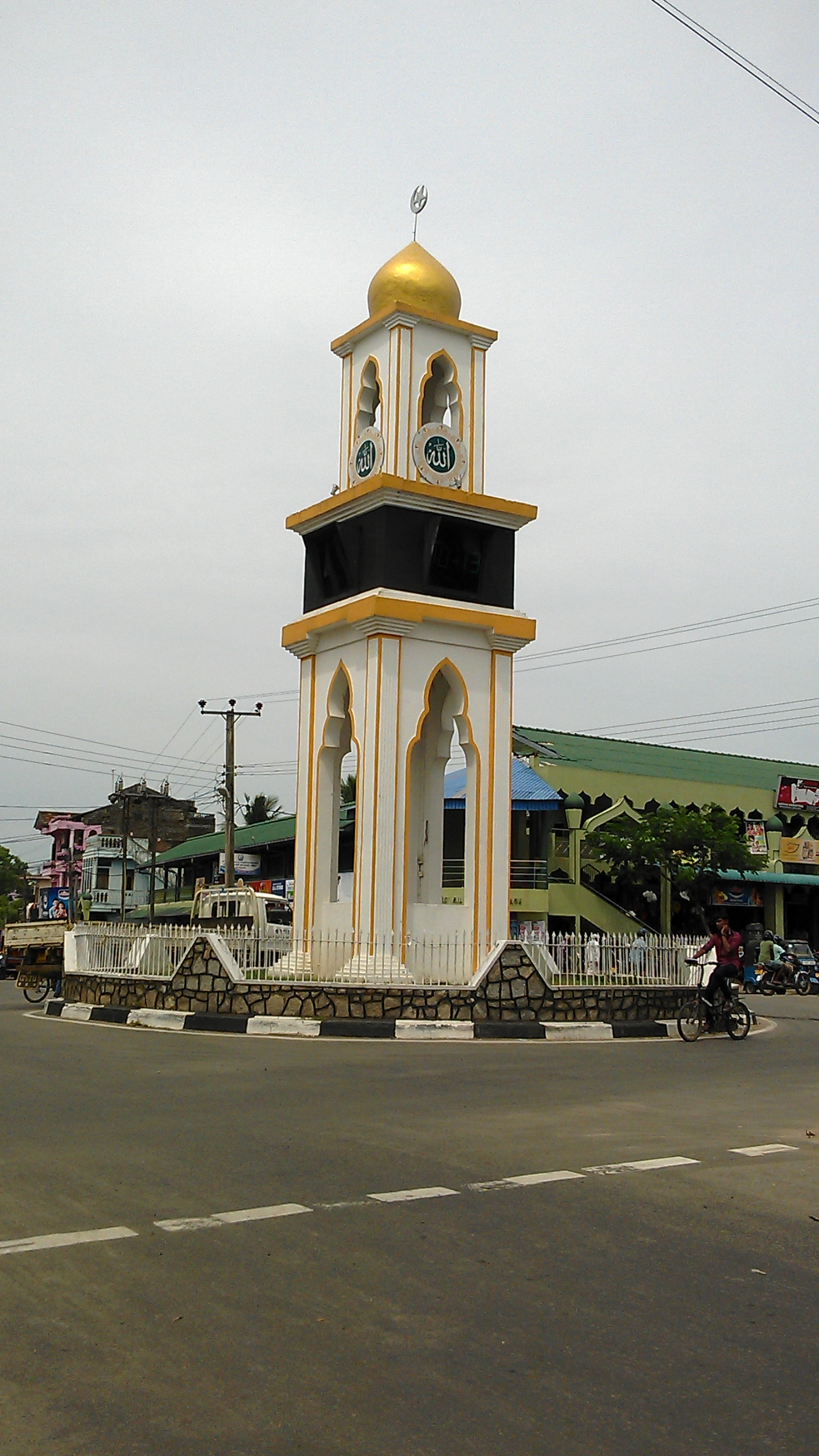
- Sammanthurai Clock Tower

- Location within Sri Lanka
- Coordinates: 7°22′0″N 81°48′0″E
- Country: Sri Lanka
- Province: Eastern
- District: Ampara
- DS Division: Sammanthurai Divisional Secretariat
- Population: 77,284

Government
  - Type: Pradeshiya Sabha
  - Chairman: [Mahir] ([ACMC])
- Time zone: UTC+5:30 (Sri Lanka Standard Time Zone)
- Postal code: 32200
- Area code: 067

Sammanthurai (Tamil: சம்மாந்துறை, romanized: Cam'māntuṟai; Sinhala: සමන්තර, romanized: Samantara, Sinhala: සම්මාන්තුරේ, romanized: Sammānturē), is a town in Ampara District of Eastern Province of Sri Lanka. It is 4.8 km west of the Bay of Bengal coast, lying between the towns of Ampara and Karaitivu along the A31 road. It is surrounded by paddy fields and it is renowned for its rice paddies and its inner harbour from ancient times.

Sammanthurai is the birthplace of M. H. M. Ashraff, known as "The Kingmaker" and the founder of the Sri Lanka Muslim Congress political party. It is also the birthplace of former minister B.A. Majeed [UNP], who developed Sammanthurai into a town.

== History ==
Sammanthurai is an important and historical place of Sri Lanka. It was the first place the Dutch arrived in Sri Lanka. The town derives its name from ‘Sampan,’ the vessel, and Thurai, the harbor or port and the sailor of Sampan called as 'Hambankaraya' (Sinhala) or ‘Sammankaran’ (Tamil) who were Muslim traders from India.

== Demographics ==
Sammanthurai has a population of 77,284 (2021), Islam is the dominant religion in the town. There is a small Hindu minority, particularly in the Veeramunai area. The majority are Tamil speaking Muslims and a few speak Sinhala and English. Sammanthurai is home to many victims of the Tsunami of 2004.

Religion in Sammanthurai (2021)
Population	Percent
Islam	87%
Hindu	12%
Christian	0.57%
Buddhist	0.04%
Others	0.39%

Source:statistics.gov.lk

== Climate ==
Being close to the equator, Sammanthurai enjoys a tropical wet and dry climate. Summer prevails in the months of May, June, July, and August. Days in June are the hottest period, with temperatures regularly reaching 30 °C. Monsoons occur in November, December and January. Sammanthurai receives most of its rainfall from the Northeast Monsoon.

== Education ==
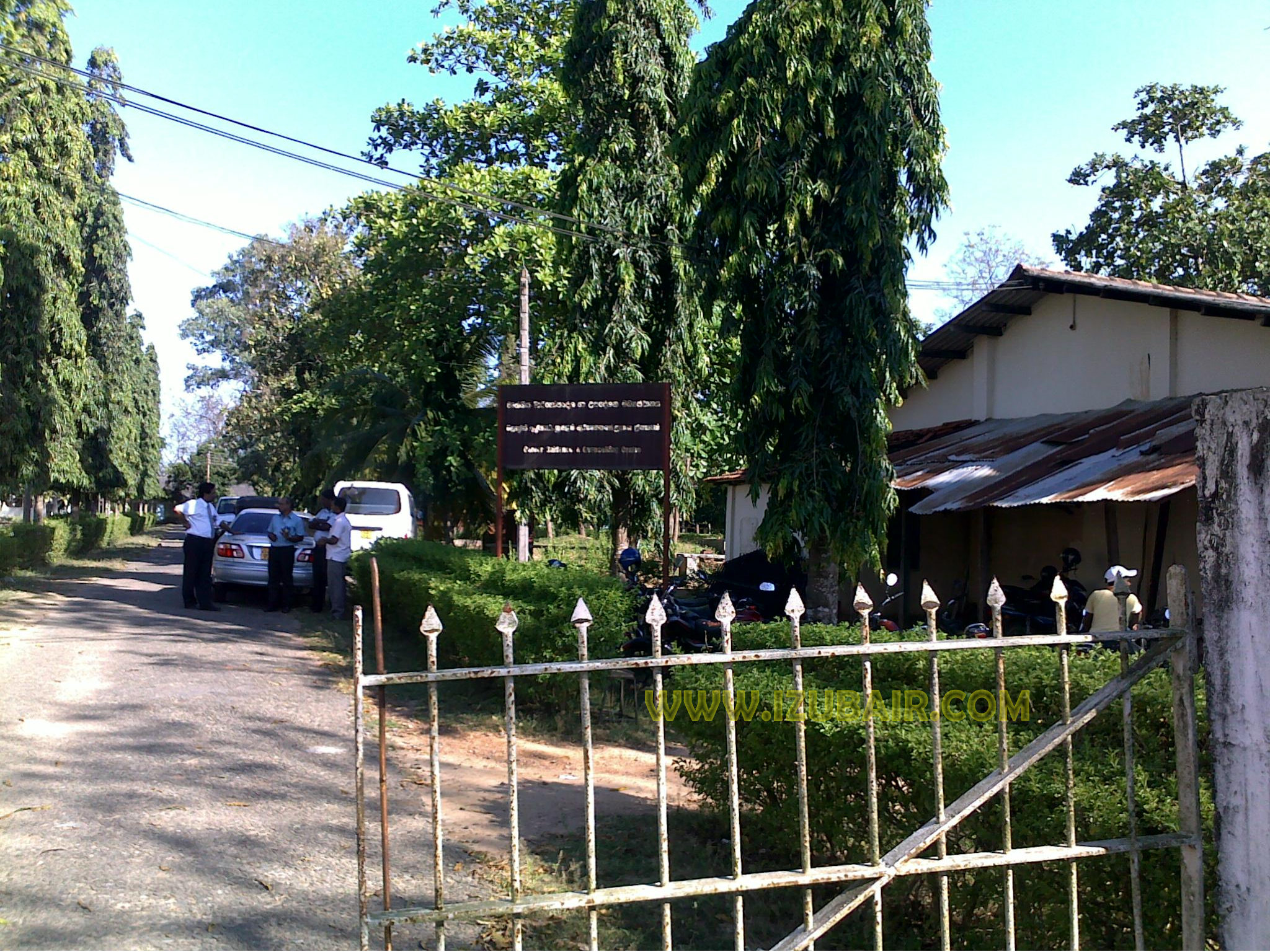
Sammanthurai Technical College

Sammanthurai has a number of post-secondary institutions. In addition to the Faculty of Applied Science campus of the South Eastern University of Sri Lanka, there are two colleges granting diplomas and certificates in Sammanthurai: Technical College and Vocational Training Center. The town is also home to two Arabic colleges: Sammanthurai Thableekul Islam and Markaz Darul Iman.

The Sammanthurai Zonal Education Office operates 70 public schools in an area of 257 km^{2} and there are 26,039 students as of 2013.

There are four public libraries are running under the local government. The main Amir Ali Public Library has more than 10,000 books and journals.

== Economy ==
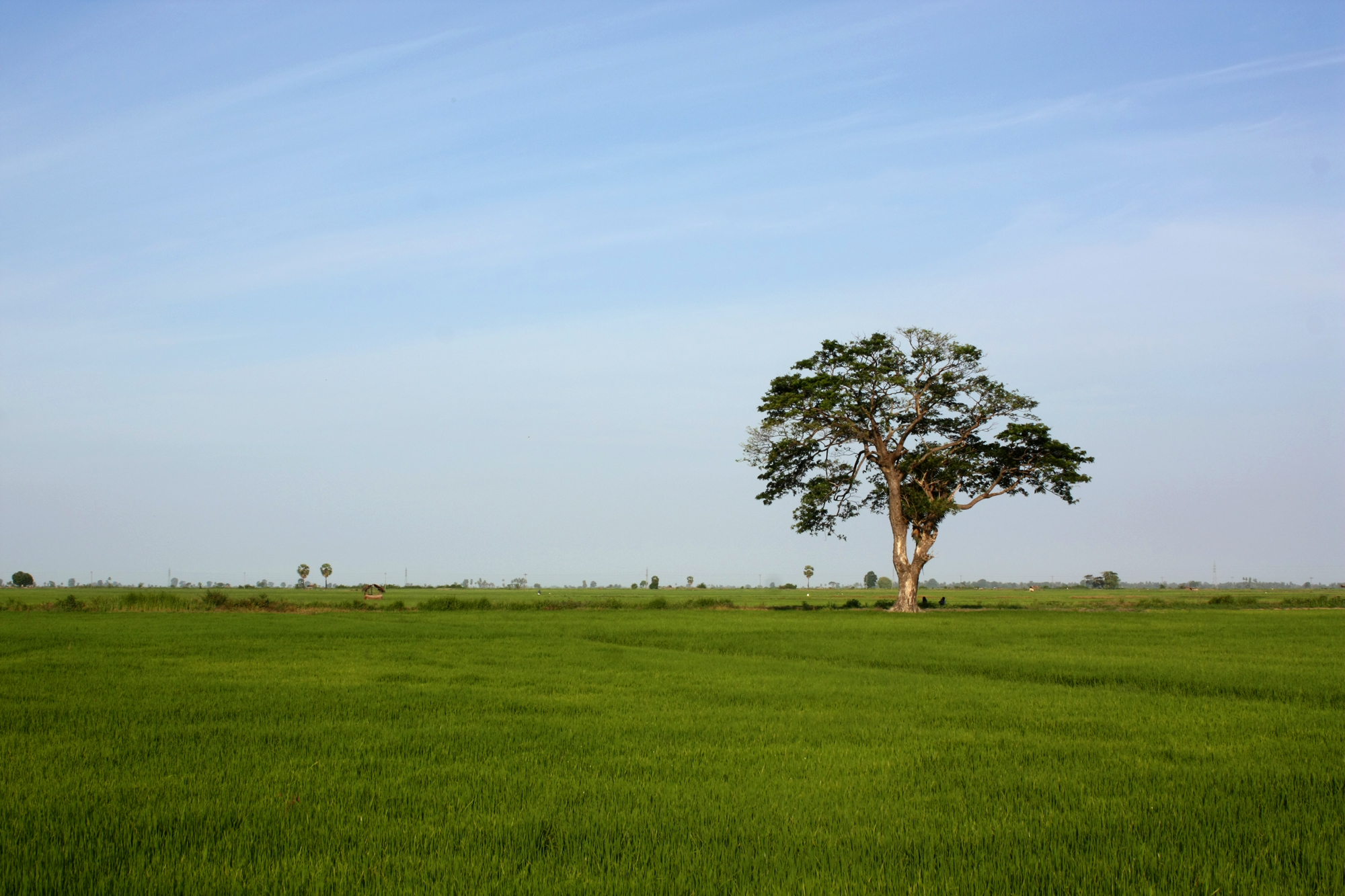
Paddy field in Sammanthurai, Ampara, Sri Lanka

Agriculture is the most important source of income and paddy is the major crop of which 55,000 acres are cultivated. Other sources of revenue include the service sector and small businesses.

== Transport and communication ==
This town is well connected via road with major towns and cities in Sri Lanka. A31 road runs through Sammanthurai. Bus service is available to the nearby cities of Kalmunai, Ampara and Batticaloa. The state-owned Sri Lanka Transport Board provides regular passenger services.

== Infrastructure ==
Sammanthurai houses a government hospital along with private hospitals/clinics. The police station serves the town as well as the surrounding villages. Government establishments like the post office, magistrates' court, Pradeshiya Shaba, Ceylon Electricity Board, Sri Lanka Transport Board Bus Depot, Rice Research Station and Divisional Secretariats of Sri Lanka are based in the town.

In addition, Group Action For Social Order (GAFSO) and Centre for Peace Studies (CPS) Sri Lanka are the national non-governmental organizations (NGOs) headquartered in Sammanthurai.

== Sports ==
Sammanthurai is home to a sports complex, a public playground and many public school playgrounds.

== Environmental issues ==
The post-tsunami and post-war development activities and subsequent resettlement programs have contributed to air pollution in this area. In addition, solid waste generation, contaminated water and mosquito breeding, have caused much damage to peoples’ health.
