= Kalmunai massacre =

1990 series of mass killings in Sri Lanka

- Location: Eastern Province, Sri Lanka
- Date: June 20 – July 10, 1990
- Target: Sri Lankan Tamil Civilians
- Deaths: 160-250
- Perpetrators: Sri Lanka Army, Muslim Home Guards

The Kalmunai massacre refers to a series of mass killings that occurred in June 1990 in Kalmunai, a municipality within the Ampara District of Sri Lanka's Eastern Province. The massacre of Tamil civilians was allegedly carried out by the Sri Lankan Army in retaliation for an earlier massacre of Sri Lankan police officers. The University Teachers for Human Rights, a human rights organization, put the number of dead in the second massacre at 250, while a local Member of Parliament claimed that at least 160 people were killed.

== Civilian massacre ==
After the LTTE massacred the police officers on 11 June 1990, the town of Kalmunai was allegedly subjected to intense shelling by the Army. As a result, the LTTE withdrew from the town. Subsequently, once the Army had occupied the town, the massacre of civilians began on 20 June 1990. One account claimed that Sri Lankan Army personnel took position at Kalmunai Rest House junction where Tamil civilians were allegedly kidnapped. The abducted were then allegedly burned behind the shops of Muslim businessmen. While the exact death toll is disputed, a member of Sri Lanka's parliament alleged that more than 160 people were killed. However, the UTHR said that the number of people who died or disappeared was in excess 1,000 and alleged that over 250 were killed. It further alleged that this massacre was the "largest bout of slaughter a single town in the island had witnessed in such a short time".

== Later attacks ==
On 27 June 1990, 75 people were allegedly rounded by the Sri Lankan Army and later burned and a further 27 headless bodies washed ashore Kalmunai beach. In all, the UTHR allege that 7,000 people were killed in June. On 10 July 1990, the Muslim Home Guards killed a further 31 people.
