= List of attacks on civilians attributed to Sri Lankan government forces =

The following is a list of attacks on civilians attributed to armed groups under the control of the Sri Lankan government, which includes the Sri Lankan Army, Sri Lankan Navy, Sri Lankan Air Force, Sri Lankan Police Service, state-backed mobs and paramilitary groups (Home Guards, EPDP, PLOTE, TMVP, Ukussa, Black Cats etc.). This list does not contain assassinations which are listed in a separate article.

The Sri Lankan Armed Forces which was almost exclusively made up of Sinhalese ethnicity during the 30-year-long Sri Lankan Civil War and the two JVP insurrections, has engaged in several counts of violence against civilians including numerous instances of civilian massacres, ethnic cleansing, pogroms, forced disappearances, sexual violence, destruction of property and assassination of civil leaders. Incidents of torture, extrajudicial killings and sexual violence have also persisted in the post war period especially against Tamils and other ethnic and sexual minorities.

Sri Lanka has also experienced attacks against civilians attributed to non state actors, such as the List of attacks attributed to the LTTE and the List of attacks on civilians attributed to the Janatha Vimukthi Peramuna.

== Attacks in chronological order ==
Attack	Date	Location	Death Toll	Injuries, Rapes, and Property Damages	Perpetrators	References
1915 Sinhalese-Muslim riots	28 May – 8 August 1915	Nationwide	63 (official)		Police	
1953 Ceylonese Hartal	12–13 August 1953	Nationwide	10		Government	
1956 anti-Tamil pogrom	June 11–16, 1956	Gal Oya, Colombo	150		Government	
Killing of civilian suspected to be insurgents and JVP activists during the suppression of the 1st JVP insurrection	1971	Nationwide	20,000+ (estimated) 1,200 (official)		Government	
Murder of Premawathie Manamperi	17 April 1971	Kataragama	1		Army	
Tamil conference incident	10 January 1974	Jaffna	8		Police	
Puttalam mosque massacre	2 February 1976	Puttalam	7	15 critically injured	Police	
1977 anti-Tamil pogrom	August 1977	Nationwide	300		Government	
Murder of Iyathurai Indrarajah	20 July 1979	Jaffna	1		Sri Lankan Police	
Burning of Jaffna Public Library	1 June 1981	Jaffna		Library burned containing over 97,000 books and manuscripts	Government, Sri Lankan Police	
1981 anti-Tamil pogrom	June 1981-August 1981	Nationwide	25		Government	
Shooting of two cyclists in Jaffna	15 October 1981	Jaffna	2		Army	
Murder of two youths near Madhu	15 October 1981	Periyathambanai, Madhu, Mannar	2		Army	
Murder of Navaratnarajah	10 April 1983	Gurunagar, Jaffna	1		Army	
Kantharmadam Army arson attack	18 May 1983	Kantharmadam, Jaffna		64 houses, 3 mini buses, 9 cars, 3 motorcycles and 36 bikes set on fire and destroyed. Civilians assaulted.	Army	
Arson attacks in Vavuniya	1 June 1983	Vavuniya		crops, huts, buildings and vehicles destroyed and burned in Gandhiyam farm at Kovilkulam; market, shops and vehicles burned and civilians assaulted; property damage over Rs. 3 million	Sri Lanka Armed Forces	
Attack on Tamil passengers on the Jaffna-Colombo train	5 June 1983	Vavuniya		Civilians assaulted.	Air Force	
Attacks on Tamils in Trincomalee	3-30 June 1983	Trincomalee	19	100+ injured, 214 houses bombed and burnt, 21 shops destroyed, 8 Hindu temples burnt	Armed Forces	
1983 anti-Tamil pogrom	May 1983-July 1983	Nationwide	3,000		Army, Government	
Thirunelveli massacre	24 July 1983	Thirunelveli, Jaffna	60+		Army	
Sampalthoddam massacre	January 1984	Sampalthoddam, Vavuniya	55-70		Army	According to pro-rebel NESOHR
Chunnakam Police station massacre	8 January 1984	Chunnakam, Jaffna	19-20		Sri Lankan Police	According to pro-rebel NESOHR
Chunnakam market massacre	28 March 1984	Chunnakam, Jaffna	10		Air Force	
Spring 1984 Jaffna massacres	28 March 1984-May 1984	Various places in Jaffna	250		Army	
1984 Valvettithurai massacre	6-8 August 1984	Valvettithurai, Jaffna	50		Army	
Jaffna bus stand shooting	8 August 1984	Jaffna		8 injured	Army	
Jaffna Main Street taxi driver killing	11 August 1984	Jaffna	1		Army	
1984 Vavuniya massacre	13 August 1984	Vavuniya	6+		Army	
August 1984 Mannar massacre	13 August 1984	Mannar	90		Army	
Murders of Kandasamy Pathar Pirapaharan and Sivasubramaniam	13 August 1984	Elephant Pass, Jaffna	2		Army	
Kaithady massacre	14 August 1984	Kaithady, Jaffna	9	25 injured	Army	
Army attack on Valvettithurai	9-14 August 1984	Valvettithurai, Jaffna		171 houses destroyed, 100 small businesses destroyed, 59 mechanised fishing boats destroyed, 4 cars destroyed, Fishing nets worth £39,000 confiscated	Army	
Murder of mental patient Thamotherampillai (45)	25 August 1984	Point Pedro, Jaffna	1		Army	
Four houses set ablaze in Achchuvely	26 August 1984	Achchuvely, Jaffna		Four houses set ablaze	Army	
1984 Point Pedro massacre	2 September 1984	Point Pedro, Jaffna	18	many injured and hospitalized, Hartley College Library burned, many shops and houses burned, hundreds displaced	STF, Army	
Mallavi junction massacre	6 September 1984	Mallavi, Mullaitivu	5		Army	
Colombo-Jaffna coach massacre	11 September 1984	Mathawachchi	17	2 women raped	Army	
Murders of Ponniah (43) and Selladurai Karunaharan (24)	11 September 1984	Mulliyavallai	2		Army	
Killing of pregnant woman Kalavathy Thangathurai (19)	16 September 1984	Karanavai, Jaffna	1	1 injured	Army	
Shooting of mill owner Sabanathan	3 October 1984	Vavuniya		Gunshot injuries to face	Army	
Murder of Allaipiddy fisherman	8 October 1984	Allaipiddy, Jaffna	1		Navy	
Murder of two Tamil youths on Palaly Road	28 October 1984	Kantharmadam, Jaffna	2		Army	
Murder of two Tamil youths in Urumpirai	28 October 1984	Urumpirai, Jaffna	2		Army	
Murder of three Tamil youth in Tellipalai	29 October 1984	Tellipalai, Jaffna	3		Army	
Jaffna-Colombo train shootings	1 November 1984	Meesalai, Punkankulam, Jaffna	2		Army	
Urelu attack	1 November 1984	Urelu, Jaffna	4	several houses looted and burnt	Army	
Urumpirai murders	1 November 1984	Urumpirai, Jaffna	2		Army	
Jaffna grand bazaar massacre	1 November 1984	Jaffna	9		Army	
Jaffna army rampage	2 November 1984	Jaffna	8	60 houses burnt and looted	Army	
Vallalai attack	2 November 1984	Vallalai, Jaffna	1	homes looted, 36+ homes destroyed, 500 rendered homeless	Army	
Urumpirai killings	2 November 1984	Urumpirai, Jaffna	50	50 killed or seriously injured	Army	
Shooting of Aziz Amjad (17) and Abdul Cafoor (16)	2 November 1984	Jaffna	2		Army	
Shooting of 3 Tamil youths in Urumpirai	6 November 1984	Urumpirai, Jaffna	3		Army	
Mullaitivu massacre	6 November 1984	Mullaitivu	8		Army	
Jaffna town massacre	9 November 1984	Jaffna	10		Army	
Kasturiar Road/Power House road junction massacre	10 November 1984	Jaffna	5	35 injured	Army	
Acid thrown into face of student S.Selvarani (24)	12 November 1984	Thinnaiveli, Jaffna			Army	
Two houses burnt in Kilinochchi	12 November 1984	Kilinochchi			Army	
Acid attack on two students from Vembadi girls school	13 November 1984	Jaffna			Army	
3 Tamil youth killed in Kilinochchi	13 November 1984	Kilinochchi	3		Army	
Jaffna-Colombo train shooting of Tamil civilians	15 November 1984	Meesalai, Jaffna	several killed		Army	
Gang rape and murder of Kumari Theresa Augustine	15 November 1984	Puloly East, Jaffna	1		Army	
Kopay massacre	18 November 1984	Kopay, Jaffna	6		Army	
Army rampage at Tellipalai	19 November 1984	Tellipalai, Jaffna		Houses looted and razed, two lorries set on fire, over 1000 people made refugees	Army	
Army rampage at Chavakachcheri	20 November 1984	Chavakachcheri, Jaffna	4	houses looted	Army	
Murder of two Tamil engineers in Anuradhapura	20 November 1984	Anuradhapura	2		Army	
Destruction of Kodikamam new market	23 November 1984	Kodikamam, Jaffna		Destruction of Kodikamam new market building	Army	
Killing of 4 Tamil civilians including a 7-year-old boy	24 November 1984	Jaffna	4		Army	
Killing of 3 fishermen in Vaharai	24 November 1984	Vaharai, Batticaloa	3		Army	
December 1984 massacres of Tamils	December 1984	Several places in Northern and Eastern provinces	1,200+		Armed Forces	
Nedunkerny massacre	1 December 1984	Nedunkerny, Vavuniya	200+		Army	
Othiyamalai massacre	2 December 1984	Othiyamalai, Mullaitivu	32		Army	
Semamadu massacre	2 December 1984	Semamadu, Vavuniya	29		Army	
Cheddikulam massacre	2 December 1984	Cheddikulam, Vavuniya	64		Army	
Kumulamunai massacre	2 December 1984	Kumulamunai, Mullaitivu	7		Army	According to pro-rebel NESOHR
Vavuniya army camp massacre	2 December 1984	Iratperiyakulam, Vavuniya	100+		Army	
Thennamarawadi massacre	2-4 December 1984	Thennamarawadi, Mullaitivu	26		Army	
Manal Aru massacre	3 December 1984	Manal Aru, Mullaitivu	100+		Army	According to pro-rebel NESOHR
Amaravayal massacre	3-4 December 1984	Amarivayal, Mullaitivu	30-50		Army	
Othiyamalai massacre	3 December 1984	Vavuniya	40		Army	
Mannar massacre	4 December 1984	Murunkan, Mannar	200+		Army	
Vavuniya massacre	4 December 1984	Vavuniya	100		Army	
Asikulam massacre	4 December 1984	Asikulam, Vavuniya	6	12 injured	Government armed mob	
Thennamarawadi village destruction	5 December 1984	Thennamarawadi, Mullaitivu		Entire village destroyed, 165 Tamil families rendered homeless	Government armed mob	
Massacre of 18 Tamil fishermen	9 December 1984	Mullaitivu	18		Home Guards	
Murder of Thambimuthu Kamalarajah	10 December 1984	Gurunagar, Jaffna	1		Army	
Madawachchiya massacre	11 December 1984	Madawachchiya	65	women raped.	Home Guards	
Periyakatru village destruction	12 December 1984	Periyakatru, Mannar		30 houses and 10 shops destroyed	Army	
Murder of Rev. George Jeyarajasingam, Jesudasan Roche and Abdul Cader Sulaiman	13 December 1984	Murunkan, Mannar	3		Army	
Mullikulam massacre	13 December 1984	Mullikulam, Mannar	6		Army	
Kokkilai massacres	15 December 1984	Several locations in Mullaitivu	131		Army	According to pro-rebel NESOHR
Arson attack on Vavuniya Tamil villages	19 December 1984	Asikulam, Chettikulam, Thathcnakulam, Vavuniya		Several houses set on fire in 3 villages	Army	
Kaddaparachchan killings	20 December 1984	Kaddaparachchan, Trincomalee	2		Army	
Attack on Periyakadu and Kandasamy Nagar villages	21 December 1984	Periyakadu, Kandasamy Nagar, Mannar		28 houses set alight and destroyed	Army	
Thiriyai massacre	21 December 1984	Thiriyai, Trincomalee	9	houses burnt and destroyed	Army	
Batticaloa-Colombo train attack	22 December 1984	Gal Oya		Tamil train passengers attacked	Army	
Windsor cinema junction massacre	22 December 1984	Jaffna	Several killed		Army	
Irupalai massacre	22 December 1984	Irupalai, Jaffna	3		Army	
Muthur massacre	22-24 December 1984	Muthur, Trincomalee	7		Army	
Mullaitivu massacre	22-24 December 1984	Mullaitivu	24	42 houses burnt and destroyed	Army	
Murder of Tamil rice mill worker	30-31 December 1984	Omanthai, Vavuniya	1		Army	
Murder of fisherman Asirwatham (24)	30-31 December 1984	Poonakari, Jaffna	1		Army	
Murder of Thamotharampillai and Kasippillai	4 January 1985	Nallur, Jaffna	2		Army	
Jaffna Hindu College massacre	4-5 January 1985	Jaffna	3	10 seriously injured	Army	
Chemmani road massacre	5 January 1985	Chemmani road, Jaffna	4		Army	
Massacre of Tamil family in Vavuniya	5 January 1985	Vavuniya	5		Army	
Vankalai church massacre	6 January 1985	Vankalai	23		Army	
Kudiyirruppu massacre	6 January 1985	Kudiyirruppu, Batticaloa	2		Army	
Kuppilan killing	6 January 1985	Kuppilan, Jaffna	1		Army	
Achchuvely massacre	9 January 1985	Achchuvely, Jaffna	3		Army	
Murder of Sinnathamby Kanapathipillai (56) and his son Krishnakumar (23)	11 January 1985	Vavuniya	2		Army	
Murder of mental patient Somu	11 January 1985	Jaffna bus stand	1		Army	
Killing of two Tamil pedestrians in Mannar	15 January 1985	Mannar	2		Army	
Mulliyavalai massacre	16 January 1985	Mulliyavalai, Mullaitivu	17		Army	
Vadakkandal massacre	30 January 1985	Vadakkandal, Mannar	52		Air Force, Army	
Army rampage in Jaffna town	6 February 1985	Jaffna	5		Army	
Murder of T.T. Rajadurai (33)	6 February 1985	Jaffna	1		Army	
Murders of Subramaniam (24) and Sivalingam (26)	6 February 1985	Cheddilkulam, Vavuniya	2	Karuppiah Ratnam (13) abducted and missing	Army	
Murder of three Tamil youth in Vavuniya	6 February 1985	Vavuniya	3		Army	
Mullaitivu massacre	15 February 1985	Mullaitivu	58		Army	
Murder of Saverimutti (55)	16 February 1985	Kopay, Jaffna	1	his car set on fire	Army	
Urumpirai Hindu college killings	16 February 1985	Urumpirai , Jaffna	2		Army	
Murders of Sittambalam Yogan (28) and Kandiah Thamotheram (35)	19 February 1985	Mullaitivu	2		Army	
Murders of student Joseph Yogarajah, Thamotherampillai Manobalan and businessman Ibrahim in Vavuniya	19 February 1985	Vavuniya	3		Army	
Army rampage in Jaffna district	23 February 1985	Various places in Jaffna District	2	8+ injured, 1 car, 1 van, 1 photographic studio destroyed	Army	
Army rampage in Kallundai	23 February 1985	Kallundai, Jaffna		Every house and hut destroyed, 2000 people made refugees	Army	
Pannai bridge massacre	24 March 1985	Jaffna	7	11 injured	STF	
Maviddapuram massacre	26 February 1985	Maviddapuram, Jaffna	4		Army	
Murder of Jeyagouri Thavarajah (33)	3 April 1985	Manipay, Jaffna	1		Army	
Shooting of tractor driver Singarajah	3 April 1985	Pannai, Jaffna	1		Army	
Murder of Ponnan (19) and Muthulingam (14)	6 April 1985	Vavuniya	2		Army	
Jaffna shootings	14 April 1985	Jaffna	2	Several injured	Army	
Kakkaitivu shootings	16 April 1985	Jaffna	1	Several injured	Army	
Mannar massacre	16 April 1985	Mannar	27		Army	
Karaitivu massacre	17 April 1985	Karaitivu, Ampara	27		STF	
Myliddy massacre	19 April 1985	Myliddy, Jaffna	4		Army	
Puthukkudiyiruppu massacre	21 April 1985	Puthukkudiyiruppu, Mullaitivu	30		Army	
Nelliaddy massacre	21 April 1985	Nelliaddy, Jaffna	9		Army	
1985 anti-Tamil pogrom in Karaitivu	22 April 1985	Karaitivu, Ampara	30	2000 Tamil homes destroyed, 15,000 made homeless, several women raped	STF, state sponsored mobs	
Shooting of two motor cyclists in Jaffna	25 April 1985	Jaffna	2		Army	
Murder of Rajadurai (69)	27 April 1985	Kondavil, Jaffna	1		Army	
Karaveddi massacre	29 April 1985	Karaveddi, Jaffna District	25+	Several houses and shops smashed and looted	Army	
Jaffna-Kerathivu bus shooting	29 April 1985	Karaveddi, Jaffna	3	Several injured	Army	
Murder of newly married couple K. Navaratnam, (36) and Sushiladevi (33)	29 April 1985	Ariyalai, Jaffna	2	Gold jewellery ripped off the bride's dead body by the troops	Army	
Point Pedro murders of Mr Johnpillai (50) and Ponnambala Chandrakumar (21)	29 April 1985	Point Pedro, Jaffna	2		Army	
Murder of Nesarajah	2 May 1985	Kodikamam, Jaffna	1		Army	
1985 Trincomalee massacres	May–September 1985	Several places in Trincomalee	280+		Navy, Army, Home Guards	
Jaffna massacre	4 May 1985	Jaffna	4		Army	
Murder of Hindu priest at Udappu	4 May 1985	Udappu	1		Army	
Oorani massacre	9 May 1985	Oorani, Jaffna	30		Army	
Murukandi Hindu temple massacre	9 May 1985	Murukandi, Vavuniya	3		Army	
Point Pedro massacre	10 May 1985	Point Pedro, Jaffna	100+		Army	
Kodikamam shooting	10 May 1985	Kodikamam, Jaffna	1	Several injured, several houses and shops smashed up	Army	
1985 Valvettithurai massacre	12 May 1985	Valvettithurai, Jaffna	46-70		Army	>
Anaikottai massacre	15 May 1985	Anaikottai, Jaffna	5		Army	
Massacre of Tamil civilians in Anuradhapura	15 May 1985	Anuradhapura	7		Army	
Massacre of Tamil civilians in Vavuniya	15 May 1985	Vavuniya	7		Army	
Kumudini boat massacre	15 May 1985	Neduntheevu, Jaffna	23		Navy	
Thambattai massacre	17 May 1985	Thambattai, Ampara	31		Police (STF)	
Batticaloa massacre	17 May 1985	Batticaloa	40		Police (STF)	
Massacre of Tamil civilians in Anuradhapura army camp	17 May 1985	Anuradhapura	6−11	20 injured	Army	
1985 Kalmunai massacre	18 May 1985	Kalmunai, Ampara	19		Police (STF)	
Army rampage at Gurunagar	19 May 1985	Gurunagar, Jaffna	1	5 injured	Army	
Two Tamil civilians shot dead in Jaffna	19 May 1985	Jaffna	1		Army	
Shootings at Gurunagar	19 May 1985	Gurunagar, Jaffna	1	1 injured	Army	
Massacre of Tamil family in Pankulam	24 May 1985	Pankulam, Trincomalee District	7		Army	
Killiveddy massacre	30 May 1985	Killiveddy, Trincomalee	44		Police	
Kent and Dollar Farms raid	June 1985	Vavuniya		Tamil families assaulted and expelled	Police	
Massacre of Tamil civilians in Trincomalee	3 June 1985	Trincomalee	13		Army	
Thiriyai massacre	8 June 1985	Thiriyai, Trincomalee	10		Army	
Mannar massacre	14 June 1985	Kokudiyan and Adampanthalvu, Mannar	22		Army	
Karainagar massacre	22 July 1985	Karainagar, Jaffna	3	2 injured	Navy	
Sampalthivu massacre	4-9 August 1985	Sampalthivu, Trincomalee	25+		Army, Navy, Air	
Vavuniya shooting spree and arson attacks	10 August 1985	Vavuniya	10	21+ seriously injured, 73 shops and 19 houses burned, Rs. 10 million in property damage	Police, Sri Lanka Armed Forces	
1985 Vavuniya massacre	16 August 1985	Vavuniya	200+		Army	
Batticaloa arson attacks	24 August 1985	Vantharumoolai, Mavadivembu, Sittandy, Morakkaddanchenai and Santhiveli, Batticaloa		350 houses burned and 1200 Tamils displaced	Police and STF	
Vayaloor massacre	24 August 1985	Vayaloor, Kilinochchi	40		Army	
Murugapuri massacre	8 September 1985	Murugapuri Trincomalee	3		Army, Home Guards	
Thuvarankadu massacre	12 September 1985	Thuvarankadu, Trincomalee	22		Army	
Chenkalady junction shooting	16 September 1985	Chenkalady, Batticaloa	2		STF	
Nilaveli massacre	16 September 1985	Nilaveli, Trincomalee	40		Army, Home Guards	
Kalvettu massacre	20 September 1985	Kalvettu, Ampara	15	10 injured	Home guards	
Sinnawathai massacre	20 September 1985	Sinnawathai, Batticaloa	10	13 injured	STF	
Palankuda killings	23 September 1985	Palankuda, Batticaloa	2		STF	
Killing of Tamil civilian in Kalladi	24 September 1985	Kalladi, Batticaloa	1	2 houses burnt down	STF	
Aarapathai massacre	26 September 1985	Aarapathai, Navatkudah, Batticaloa	7	49 houses, 2 shops and a market all burnt down in nearby Navatkudah	STF	
Sambaltivu massacre	1 October 1985	Sambaltivu, Trincomalee	4		Army	
Piramanthanaru massacre	2 October 1985	Piramanthanaru, Kilinochchi	16	30 injured and 75+ houses burned	Army, Keenie Meenie Services	
Oddusuddan massacre	2 October 1985	Oddusuddan, Mullaitivu	18		Army	
Killing of Sinnathamby Mahendran	2 October 1985	Batticaloa	1		Army	
Murakkottanchenai massacre	5 October 1985	Murakkottanchenai, Batticaloa	12	Several houses and shops burnt	STF	
Killing of Tamil civilian in Kilinochchi	6 October 1985	Kilinochchi	1		Army	
Killing of two Tamil civilians in Vidathaltivu	6 October 1985	Vidathaltivu, Mannar	2		Army	
Killing of Tamil civilian in Kalladi	8 October 1985	Kalladi, Batticaloa	1		Army	
Vantharumoolai shooting	5 November 1985	Vantharumoolai, Batticaloa	3		Army	
1985 Muttur massacre	8-10 November 1985	Muttur, Trincomalee	30-100		Army, Navy, Air Force	
Kantalai massacre	9 November 1985	Kantalai, Trincomalee	6	Jewellery looted	Army	
Batticaloa Lake Road massacre	13 November 1985	Lake Road, Batticaloa	13		STF	
Army rampage in Batticaloa	16 November 1985	Bar Road, Batticaloa	8-scores killed	locals assaulted, and several dozen houses looted and burned	Army	
Arrests and disappearances of 7 Tamils from Muttur	17 November 1985	Muttur, Trincomalee	7		Sri Lankan security forces	
Urani shooting	20 November 1985	Urani, Batticaloa	2		Army	
Onthachimadam shooting	23 November 1985	Onthachimadam, Batticaloa	8		Army	
Sampur massacre	27 November 1985	Sampur, Trincomalee	21	8 injured, 165 houses burned	Army, Navy, Home guards	
Muttur massacres	28 November 1985	Sampur and Kaddaiparichchan, Trincomalee	16		government forces	
Mandur massacre	28 November 1985	Mandur, Batticaloa	24		Sri Lankan Air Force	
Thiruvaiyaru attack	29 November 1985	Thiruvaiyaru, Kilinochchi	4	houses looted	Sri Lankan Army	
Thampalakamam raid	30 November 1985	Thampalakamam, Trincomalee	7		Sri Lankan Army	
Akkaraipattu-Pottuvil road shooting	1 December 1985	Akkaraipattu-Pottuvil road, Ampara	2		Sri Lankan Army	
Kalladi shooting	1 December 1985	Kalladi, Batticaloa	6	a store, a firewood mill and 2 houses were burned	Sri Lankan Army	
Arasadi junction shooting of a youth	2 December 1985	Arasadi junction, Batticaloa	1		Sri Lankan Army	
Palai search operation	3 December 1985	Palai, Kilinochchi	1	64 people, including 8 bound and bleeding youths, were taken to army camp. Of the 5 other injured, 3 were hospitalized. Palai railway station was damaged. Walls of houses were damaged with bullet holes.	Sri Lankan Army	
Raid on Tamil village in Muttur	3 December 1985	Muttur, Trincomalee		9 arrested. 4 houses burned.	Sri Lankan Army	
Mullaitivu-Nedunkerny road search operation	3-5 December 1985	Mullaitivu-Nedunkerny road, Mullaitivu		some children missing. many locals assaulted.	Sri Lankan Army	
Attack on Tamils travelling in a lorry in Vavuniya	3 December 1985	Vavuniya army camp, Vavuniya		occupants assaulted. one youth missing.	Sri Lankan Army	
Attack on 2 Tamils travelling in a lorry in Chilaw	6 December 1985	Chilaw, Puttalam		2 injured and hospitalized	Army	
Attack on a Tamil traveller in Navatkuli	6 December 1985	Navatkuli, Jaffna		32-year-old Subramaniyam Kumarasamy assaulted and hospitalized	Army	
Shooting of detainees in Seruvila army camp	6 December 1985	Seruvila, Trincomalee	10		Army	
Attack on Vavuniya store owner	7 December 1985	Vavuniya		56-year-old Raamayya severely assaulted and hospitalized	Army	
Karadiyanaru cordon and search operation	7 December 1985	Karadiyanaru, Batticaloa	1	25 arrested	Army	
Paranthan road shooting	8 December 1985	Paranthan, Kilinochchi	1	2 injured. 5 detained. 1 motorcycle seized.	Army	
Anpuvalipuram road shooting	10 December 1985	Anpuvalipuram, Trincomalee		2 Tamil children injured and hospitalized	Home Guards	
Uruthirapuram massacre	10 December 1985	Uruthirapuram, Kilinochchi	10	many injured. 25+ with gunshot wounds hospitalized. some arrested. locals fled to forest. 2 houses damaged.	Army	
Muttur search operation	10-11 December 1985	Muttur, Trincomalee	2	6 women sexually assaulted, 2 women arrested and 2 stores burned	Army	
Jaffna city shooting	12 December 1985	Jaffna city, Jaffna	2	3 injured. houses damaged by bullets.	Army	
Valantalai-Ponnalai shooting	17 December 1985	Valantalai and Ponnalai junctions, Jaffna	2	5 hospitalized	Army	
Oddusuddan shooting	17 December 1985	Oddusuddan, Mullaitivu	3	6 injured, 2 houses damaged	Army	
Keerimalai arson attack	17 December 1985	Keerimalai, Jaffna		3 houses burned	Army	
Columbuthurai-Ariyalai shooting	20 December 1985	Columbuthurai, Ariyalai, Jaffna	2	2 hospitalized	Army	
Jaffna helicopter shootings	21 December 1985	Suthumalai, Manipay, Sanguveli, Thavadi, Uduvil, Inuvil, Kokkuvil, Vayavilan, Kadduvan and Myliddy, Jaffna	7	many injured (10+ seriously) and hospitalized, many houses damaged	Air Force	
Munnampodivettai massacre	25 December 1985	Munnampodivettai, Trincomalee	10	4 women gang raped	Army	
Rape and murder of 2 Tamil women in Muthur	25 December 1985	Muthur, Trincomalee	2	2 women raped	Muslim Home Guards	
Jaffna helicopter massacres	4 January 1986	Jaffna	17	91 injured	Air Force	
Jaffna massacres	23 January 1986	Tellipalai, Veemankamam, Kadduvan	16	several injured, 22 houses, 1 van and several cars set on fire	Armed Forces	
Iruthayapuram massacre	19 January 1986	Iruthayapuram, Batticaloa	23		Police	
Nayaru helicopter killings	24 January 1986	Nayaru, Mullaitivu	2	several injured	Air Force	
Kilinochchi Railway Station massacre	25 January 1986	Kilinochchi	12		Army	
Thampalakamam massacre	27 January 1986	Thampalakamam, Trincomalee	10		Army	
Massacre of Tamil private van passengers	1 February 1986	Elephant Pass, Jaffna	29		Army	
Bombing raid on Jaffna	19 February 1986	Jaffna	7	several houses and a rice mill damaged	Air Force	
Akkaraipattu massacre	19 February 1986	Akkaraipattu, Ampara	80		Army, Muslim Home Guards	
Jaffna bombings	27 February 1986	Jaffna	3	5 injured	Air Force	
Nainativu massacre	3 March 1986	Nainativu, Jaffna	4	15 injured	Army	
Bombing of fishing village in Jaffna	12 March 1986	Jaffna	3	several injured	Air Force	
Myliddy bombings	13 March 1986	Jaffna	5	several injured	Air Force	
Murder of Vellaichamy Thinakaranathan	14 March 1986	Paranthan, Kilinochchi	1		Army	
Kilinochchi killing	16 March 1986	Kilinochchi	1	several injured	Army	
Thondamannaru killing	16 March 1986	Jaffna	1	several houses damaged	Army	
Vavuniya killings	16 March 1986	Vavuniya	2		Army	
Kilinochchi massacre	16 March 1986	Kilinochchi	7		Army	
Muthur massacre	16 March 1986	Muthur, Trincomalee	5		Army	
Murder of Kathirkamanathan Balamurali (15)	17 March 1986	Navatkuli, Jaffna	1		Army	
Mallikaitivu junction massacre	17 March 1986	Muthur, Trincomalee	5		Army	
Attack on Tamil villages in Muthur	18 March 1986	Muthur, Trincomalee		Several houses looted and burned. Some shops and houses completely destroyed.	Army	
Kilinochchi massacre	18 March 1986	Kilinochchi	4	several injured	Army	
Murder of K Sundaralingham	18 March 1986	Kalmunai, Ampara	1	1 injured	STF	
Killing of two youths in Batticaloa	19 March 1986	Batticaloa	2		Army	
Vavuniya massacres	19-20 March 1986	Eeddimurnchan village. Nedunkerny	20		Army	
Koddady killings	21 March 1986	Koddady, Jaffna	2		Air Force	
Jaffna bombings	21 March 1986	Jaffna	3	29 injured	Air Force	
Puthukudirruppu massacre	21 March 1986	Puthukudirruppu, Mullaitivu	7	looting reported	Army	
Thondamannaru helicopter murder	21 March 1986	Jaffna	1		Air Force	
Selvasannithy temple attack	21-22 March 1986	Jaffna	4		Army	
Murder of Sugumaran	22 March 1986	Kallar, Batticaloa	1		Army	
Koonithivu shooting	23 March 1986	Koonithivu, Trincomalee	1	10 injured	Army	
Mannar killings	24 March 1986	Mannar	2		Army	
Vavuniya massacre	25 March 1986	Vavuniya	5		Army	
Kurumbacitty killing	26 March 1986	Kurumbacitty, Jaffna	1	3 injured	Air Force	
Murder of Mr. A. Ganeshapillai	27 March 1986	Point Pedro Jaffna	1		Army	
Tellipalai bombing	27 March 1986	Tellipalai, Jaffna	1	several injured	Air Force	
Vantharumoolai killings	30 March 1986	Vantharumoolai, Batticaloa	2		Army	
Army attack on Kadduvan	30 March 1986	Kadduvan, Jaffna		Large rice mill and 10 houses destroyed	Army	
Vavuniya killings	31 March 1986	Vavuniya	3		Army	
Palaly killings	31 March 1986	Palaly, Jaffna	2	4 injured	Army	
Jaffna helicopter killings	2 April 1986	Jaffna	3	several injured and several houses damaged	Air Force	
Palaly helicopter acid attacks	2 April 1986	Jaffna		acid thrown from helicopter, 2 victims admitted to hospital	Air Force	
Murder of Dr. Christopher Noel (26)	5 April 1986	Ottankulam, Kilinochchi	1	Burnt alive in car	Army	
Jaffna bombings	6 April 1986	Jaffna	2	10 injured	Air Force	
Murder of Karunakaran	6 April 1986	Batticaloa	1		Army	
Murder of Subramaniam Rajaratnam	10 April 1986	Thiriyai, Trincomalee	1	1 injured	Army	
Murder of farmer Sinniah Nandakumar (32)	10 April 1986	Nilaveli, Trincomalee	1		Army	
Murder of Mathiaparanam Jegan (22)	15 April 1986	Mankulam, Mullaitivu	1		Army	
Navatkuli killings	17 April 1986	Navatkuli, Jaffna	2		Army	
Thondamannaru killings	21 April 1986	Thondamannaru, Jaffna	2	several others killed and injured	Army	
Murders of Narayanasamy Ravindran (21) and Joseph Gunaseelan	23 April 1986	Visuvamadu, Mullaitivu	2		Army	
Killing of P. Ravi (29)	27 April 1986	Tellippalai, Jaffna	2		Navy	
Valalai killings	30 April 1986	Valalai, Jaffna	2	2 injured	Army	
Massacre of Trincomalee Tamil refugees	30 April 1986	Muthur, Thiriyay Trincomalee	17		Army	
Murder of A Sebamalai	30 April 1986	Palaly, Jaffna	1		Army	
Kilinochchi killing	1 May 1986	Kilinochchi	1		Army	
Eravur killings	4 May 1986	Eravur, Batticaloa	3		Army	
Gurunagar fishermen sea massacre	10 June 1986	Mandaitivu, Jaffna	33		Navy	
Seruvila massacre	12 June 1986	Seruvila, Trincomalee	21		Home Guards	
Mannar massacre	13 June 1986	Mannar, Mannar	26		Army, Air Force	
Murder of Michael Gnanapragasam	19 June 1986	Kilinochchi	1		Army	
Murder of M. Wensceslaus	20 June 1986	Jaffna	1		Army	
1986 Thambalakamam massacre	28 June 1986	Thambalakamam, Trincomalee	34		Home Guards	
Mollipothana massacre	10 July 1986	Mollipothana, Trincomalee	11		Home Guards	
Pavatkulam massacre	13 July 1986	Pavatkulam, Vavuniya	9		Army	
Peruveli refugee camp massacre	15 July 1986	Peruveli, Trincomalee	48	20 injured, many women raped	Army, Home Guards	
Thanduvan bus massacre	17 July 1986	Thanduvan, Mullaitivu	17		Army	According to pro-rebel NESOHR
Manalchenai massacre	18 July 1986	Manalchenai, Trincomalee	67	7 women raped	Army	
Murder of T.Markandu and his son Chandradasan	28 July 1986	Ariyakulam, Jaffna	2		Army	
Murder of V.Nalliah	28 July 1986	Karainagar, Jaffna	1		Navy	
Batticaloa Munnai street massacre	18 September 1986	Batticaloa	47		Army	
Killing of pregnant woman Mrs. Selvanayakam (18)	12 October 1986	Point Pedro, Jaffna	1		Navy	
Kurikattuvan massacre	16 October 1986	Kurikattuvan, Jaffna	13		Navy	
Jaffna Hospital bombing	29 October 1986	Jaffna	4	32 injured	Army	
Massacre of Batticaloa refugees	31 October 1986	Batticaloa	6		Army	
Bombing of Periya-porativu	2 November 1986	Periya-porativu, Batticaloa	several killed	20 houses damaged, >1000 made homeless	Army	
Pullumalai massacre	10 November 1986	Pullumalai, Batticaloa	320	50 injured	Army, Government armed mob	
Jaffna bombings	11 November 1986	Jaffna	6	42 injured	Army	
Periya-pullumalai massacre	11 November 1986	Periya-pullumalai, Ampara	20	3 women raped, 25 others abducted and believed dead	Army	
Murder of Iruthayan Michael Collins	15 November 1986	Akkaraipattu, Ampara	1		STF	
Valaichenai killings	19 November 1986	Valaichenai, Batticaloa	2		Army	
Murder of Gopalasingham	21 November 1986	Mulliyawalai, Mullaitivu	1	1 injured, wristlet stolen	Army	
Coolavady colony massacre	23 November 1986	Coolavady colony, Batticaloa	3	20 injured	STF	
Kalmunai police rampage	13 December 1986	Kalmunai, Ampara	4	50 houses, 5 cars, a Hindu Temple, 3 Rice Mills and a lorry destroyed	Police, STF	
Attacks on civilians during the suppression of the 2nd JVP insurrection	1987-89	Nationwide	60,000-80,000		Government	
Prawn farm massacre / Kokkadichcholai massacre	27-29 January 1987	Kokkadichcholai, Batticaloa	200+		Police (STF)	
Jaffna bombings	7 March 1987	Jaffna	21	100 injured	Air Force	
Jaffna girls' school bombing	April 1987	Martin Road, Jaffna	15		Air Force	
Bombing of Jaffna peninsula	22-26 April 1987	Jaffna	scores	hundreds injured and hundreds of houses, shops, businesses destroyed	Sri Lanka Armed Forces	
Valalai massacre	20 May 1987	Valalai, Jaffna	9		Army	
Bombing of Kankesanthurai Sivan Kovil	May 1987	Kankesanthurai Road, Jaffna	17		Air Force	
Polikandy search operation killings	May 1987	Polikandy, Jaffna	20		Army	
Bombing of Suthumalai Amman Kovil	25 May 1987	Suthumalai, Jaffna	7		Army	
St. James School shelling	25 May 1987	Main Street, Jaffna	8		Army	
Alvai Muthumariamman temple shelling	29 May 1987	Alvai, Jaffna	75	many injured	Army	
Killings of Nelliady Murugan temple refugees	31 May 1987	Nelliady, Jaffna	3	one injured	Army	
Killings of Puttalai Pillayar Kovil refugees	1 June 1987	Point Pedro, Jaffna	6		Army	
Bombing of Neervely Kandaswamy temple	6 June 1987	Neervely, Jaffna	25	Temple destroyed	Air Force	
Pavatkuli Chenai Pillaiyar Kovil massacre	3 July 1987	Pavatkuli Chenai, Batticaloa	48		STF	
Tissamaharama massacre	November 1987	Tissamaharama	scores		Sri Lankan Armed Forces	
Batticaloa police rampage	24 December 1987	Batticaloa	25	shops and houses burnt	Police	
Eppawala massacre	20 March 1989	Eppawala	14		Black Cats	
1989 Kandy massacre	16 September 1989	Several places in Kandy District	100-150		Eagles of the Central Hills	
Hambantota district massacres	21 December 1989	Hambantota, Tissamaharama, Ambalantota, Beliatta	177		Army, Police	
Nittambuwa massacre	27 February 1990	Nittambuwa	12		Police	
Killings of Tamils in Amparai	June - October 1990	Amparai	3,000		government forces	
Disappearances of Tamils in Batticaloa	June - December 1990	Batticaloa	1,500		government forces	
Sammanthurai massacre	10 June 1990	Sammanthurai, Ampara	37		Army, Muslim Home Guards	According to pro-rebel NESOHR
Kalmunai massacre	12 June 1990	Kalmunai, Ampara	160-250		Army	
Vavuniya massacre	13 June 1990	Vavuniya	15		Army	
Trincomalee Base Hospital mass arrest and disappearances	15 June 1990	Base Hospital, Trincomalee	30		Army	
Thiriyai massacre	June 1990 (mid)	Thiriyai, Trincomalee	25-35		Army	
Vellaveli massacre	June 1990	Vellaveli, Batticaloa	15		Army	
Kalmunai massacres	22-23 June 1990	Kalmunai, Ampara	36+		Army	
Veeramunai massacres	20 June 1990 - 15 August 1990	Veeramunai, Ampara	253		Muslim Home Guards	
China Bay Police custody killings	4 July 1990	China Bay, Trincomalee	5		Police	
Mannar arson attacks	8 July 1990	Mannar-Murunkan road, Mannar		64 houses, 32 shops and 2 hospitals burned; 20 houses and 10+ shops robbed	Army	
Kalmunai massacre	10 July 1990	Kalmunai, Ampara	31		Army, Muslim Home Guards	
McHeyzer Stadium mass arrest and disappearances	11 July 1990	Plantain Point Army Camp, Trincomalee	52		Army	
Paranthan junction massacre	24 July 1990	Paranthan, Kilinochchi	10		Army	According to pro-rebel NESOHR
Siththandy massacre	20 July 1990 and 27 July 1990	Siththandy, Batticaloa	137		Army	According to pro-rebel NESOHR
Pottuvil massacre	30 July 1990	Pottuvil, Ampara	125		Army	
Tiraikerny massacre	6 August 1990	Tiraikerny, Ampara	40		Muslim Home Guards	
Xavierpuram massacre	7 August 1990	Alikampai, Ampara	7	1 disappeared, 12 badly injured; houses, church and school burned	Muslim Home Guards	
Kalmunai massacres	11-12 August 1990	Karaitivu military camp, Ampara	62		Army	According to pro-rebel NESOHR
Thuranilavani massacre	12 August 1990	Thuranilavani, Batticaloa	60+		Army	According to pro-rebel NESOHR
Koraveli massacre	14 August 1990	Koraveli, Batticaloa	15		Army	According to pro-rebel NESOHR
Nelliyady market bombing	29 August 1990	Nelliyady, Jaffna	16		Army	According to pro-rebel NESOHR
Eastern University massacre (September 1990)	5 September 1990	Vantharumulai, Batticaloa	158		Army, Muslim Home Guards	
Batticaloa massacre / Sathurukondan massacre	9 September 1990	Batticaloa	205		Army, Muslim Home Guards	
Natpiddimunai massacre	10 September 1990	Natpiddimunai, Ampara	23		Police STF	According to pro-rebel NESOHR
Savukkadi Massacre	20 September 1990	Savukkadi, Batticaloa	33		Army, Muslim Home guards	
Thalavai Massacre	20 September 1990	Thalavai, Batticaloa	9+		Army, Muslim Home guards	
1990 Puthukkudiyiruppu Massacre	21 September 1990	Puthukkudiyiruppu, Batticaloa	17	27 Injured	Muslim Home Guards	
Bombing of Uthayan newspaper office	27 September 1990	Jaffna	1		Air Force	
Killing of Tamils in Pottuvil	October 1990	Pottuvil, Ampara	160		Police STF	
Chavakachcheri market massacre	9 October 1990	Chavakachcheri, Jaffna	12		Army	
Karaitivu massacre	13 October 1990	Karaitivu, Ampara	20		STF	
Karainagar naval attack	15 November 1990	Karainagar, Jaffna	5	12 injured	Navy	
Oddusuddan bombing	27 November 1990	Oddusuddan, Mullaitivu	12		Air Force	According to pro-rebel NESOHR
Vaddukkoddai bombing	15 December 1990	Vaddukkoddai, Jaffna	1	2 injured	Air Force	
Velanai bombing	16 December 1990	Velanai Jaffna	4	several injured	Air Force	
Thathamalai massacre	17 December 1990	Thathamalai, Batticaloa	5		Army	
Massacre of Tamil civilians near Samadhu Pillaiyar Temple	18 December 1990	Trincomalee	5		Army	
Murder of toddy tapper Swakim (45)	22 December 1990	Karampon, Jaffna	1		Army	
Valaichchenai massacre	22 December 1990	Valaichchenai, Batticaloa	9		Home guards	
Shelling of Valikamam North	22 December 1990	Valikamam, Jaffna	1	2 injured, several houses damaged	Army	
Puthukudiyiruppu bombing	31 January 1991	Puthukudiyiruppu, Mullaitivu	23	13 injured	Air Force	
Valvettithurai bombings	20-23 January 1991	Valvettithurai, Jaffna	10	20 injured, 101 houses destroyed, 451 damaged, 6 temples, one church and 4 schools bombed	Air Force	
Murukandy temple bombing	January 1991	Murukandy, Kilinochchi	3		Air Force	
Jaffna bombings	February 1991 (first week)	Jaffna	27	25 injured, 500 houses destroyed, 100 other buildings destroyed	Air Force	
Vankalai junction massacre	17 February 1991	Vankalai, Mannar	4		Army	
Eravur massacre	20 February 1991	Eravur, Batticaloa	6	25 seriously wounded injured	Home Guards	
Iruthayapuram massacre	30 March 1991	Iruthayapuram, Batticaloa	11		Police	
Nayanmar Thidal massacre	12 April 1991	Nayanmar Thidal, Tampalakamam, Trincomalee	4		Army	
Kokkadichcholai massacre	12 June 1991	Kokkadichcholai, Batticaloa	152-220		Army	
Disappearances of Tamils in Batticaloa	January - November 1992	Batticaloa	400		government forces	
Mandur massacre	April 1992	Mandur, Batticaloa	8		Army, Paramilitaries	
Tampalakamam massacre	April 1992	Tampalakamam, Trincomalee	4		Army	
Polonnaruwa massacre	29 April 1992	Muthugal and Karapola	87		Home Guards, Police	
Vathappali Kannagi Amman temple massacre	18 May 1992	Vathappali, Mullaitivu	23	30 injured	Army	
Sri Durga Devi temple massacre	31 May 1992	Tellipalai, Jaffna	6	25 seriously injured, 100 received minor injuries	Air Force	
Mylanthanai massacre	9 August 1992	Mylanthanai, Batticaloa	35-50		Army	
Paliyadivaddai massacre	24 October 1992	Paliyadivaddai, Batticaloa	10-11			
1993 Jaffna lagoon massacre / Kilaly massacre	2 January 1993	Jaffna Lagoon	50-100		Navy	
Vannathi Aru Massacre	17 February 1993	Vannathi Aru, Batticaloa	16		Army	
Kalviankadu massacre	27 July 1993	Kalviankadu, Jaffna	6		Air Force	
Jaffna lagoon massacre	29 July 1993	Jaffna Lagoon	19		Navy	
Bombing of the Gurunagar Church	13 November 1993	Gurunagar, Jaffna	10	25	Air Force	
Chundikulam massacre	18 February 1994	Chundikulam, Kilinochchi	10		Navy	According to pro-rebel NESOHR
1994 Jaffna lagoon massacre	27 February 1994	Jaffna Lagoon	30		Air Force	
Pulmoddai massacre	6 May 1995	Pulmoddai, Trincomalee	5		Army	
Navaly church bombing	9 July 1995	Navaly, Jaffna	125-150		Air Force	
Bolgoda killings	April–September 1995	Colombo	31		STF	
Nagerkovil school bombing	22 September 1995	Nagerkovil, Jaffna	71-113		Air Force	
Jaffna killings	October 1995	Jaffna	104	194 injured	Air Force, Army	
Kumarapuram massacre / Trincomalee massacre / Killiveddy massacre	11 February 1996	Kumarapuram, Trincomalee	26		Army	
Nachchikuda strafing	16 March 1996	Poonagari, Jaffna	16		Army	
Kilinochchi town massacre	August 1996	Kilinochchi	184		Army	According to pro-rebel NESOHR
Disappearances and mass graves in Jaffna	1995-1996	Jaffna, Chemmani	600		Army	
Murder of Kandiah Vijayanathan (21)	18 December 1996	Meesalai, Jaffna	1		Army	
Murders of Thevarajah Vigneswaran (22) and Somasundaram Sivakumar (22)	11 January 1997	Karainagar, Jaffna	2		Navy	
Murder of Ratnasabapathy Vigneswaran (40)	17 January 1997	Ponnalai, Jaffna	1		Army	
Murder of Rasalingam Ratnasingam (45)	23 January 1997	Kokkuvil, Jaffna	1		Army	
Murders of Nagamutthu Rajendram (40) and Krishnan Perampalam (32)	28 February 1997	Sangaratthai, Jaffna	2		Army	
Murder of Nadarajah	March 1997	Chankanai, Jaffna	1		Army	
Murder of Pakianathan Aingaran (18)	17 March 1997	Nacchimar Kovil, Jaffna	1	2 others injured	Army	
Murder of Tharmarajah Janarthanan	29 March 1997	Karainagar, Jaffna	1		Navy	
Murder of Sivarajah Manivannan	7 April 1997	Alaveddy, Jaffna	1		Army	
Murder of Kanapathippilai Pratheepan	8 April 1997	Anaikkottai, Jaffna	1		Army	
Rape and murder of Murugesapillai Koneswary	17 May 1997	Amparai	1		Army	
Murder of Kandasamy Rathinamma	20 May 1997	Inuvil West, Jaffna	1		Army	
Murder of Kathiravelu Suresh (33)	20 May 1997	Kokkuvil, Jaffna	1	1 other injured	Army	
Vavunikulam church bombing	18 August 1997	Vavunikulam, Mullaitivu	9		Air Force	According to pro-rebel TamilNet
Tamil 4th colony massacre	24 September 1997	Amparai	8-15		Home Guards	According to pro-rebel TamilNet
Kalutara Tamil prisoner massacre	12 December 1997	Kalutara	3		Sinhala prisoners incited by prison officials	
Tampalakamam massacre	1 February 1998	Tampalakamam, Trincomalee	8		Police, Home Guards	
Army shelling of civilian areas in Karayakkanthivu	4 February 1998	Karayakkanthivu, Batticaloa		9 injured	Army	According to pro-rebel TamilNet
Satha Sagaya Maatha Church bombing	4 March 1998	Murasumoddai, Kilinochchi			Air Force	According to pro-rebel TamilNet
Killing of Peethaambaram Sashikala (6)	11 March 1998	Batticaloa	1		Army	According to pro-rebel TamilNet
Vattakkachchi and Periyakulam bombings	26 March 1998	Vaddakachchi, Periyakulam, Kilinochchi	8		Air Force	According to pro-rebel TamilNet
Murder of Vijayakumari	16 April 1998	Point Pedro, Jaffna	1		Army	According to pro-rebel TamilNet
Killing of Kilinochchi Christian priests	7 June 1998	Kanakampikaikkulam, Kilinochchi	2		Air Force	According to pro-rebel TamilNet
Suthanthirapuram bombing	10 June 1998	Suthanthirapuram, Mullaitivu	20+		Air Force	According to pro-rebel TamilNet
Paythali shelling	31 July 1998	Paythali, Batticaloa			Army	According to pro-rebel TamilNet
Torture of Thambirajah Kamalathasan	July 1998	Colombo			Police	According to pro-rebel TamilNet
Kilinochchi-Mullaithivu bombing	14 November 1998	Kilinochchi-Mullaithivu	2		Air Force	According to pro-rebel TamilNet
Kilinochchi bombing	24 November 1998	Kilinochchi-Mullaithivu	4		Army	According to pro-rebel TamilNet
Visuvamadu shelling	25 November 1998	Puthukkudiyiruppu	8		Air Force	According to pro-rebel NESOHR
Chundikulam bombing	2 December 1998	Chundikulam, Kilinochchi	7		Air Force	According to pro-rebel NESOHR
Eravur killings	26 April 1999	Eravur, Batticaloa	3	17 seriously wounded	Police	
Gang rape and murder of Ida Carmelitta	12 July 1999	Mannar Town	1		Army	
Gang rape and murder of Sarathambal	12 July 1999	Pungudutivu, Jaffna	1		Navy	
Torture of three Tamil students	10 September 1999	Colombo			Police	
Puthukkudiyiruppu bombing	15 September 1999	Puthukkudiyiruppu	21		Air Force	
Jaffna Lagoon massacre	15 September 1999	Thenmaradchi	7		Army	According to pro-rebel TamilNet
Murder of A.Yogeswary, 34 and her daughter, V.Nageswaray, 14	29 September 1999	Kaluwankerni, Batticaloa	2		Army	According to pro-rebel TamilNet
Murder of S.Vinayakam, 58	1 November 1999	Kathiraveli, Batticaloa	1		Army	According to pro-rebel TamilNet
Bombing of Palinagar	3 November 1999	Suthanthirapuram, Mullaitivu	25	50 Injured	Air Force	
Madhu church shelling	20 November 1999	Madhu, Mannar	40		Air Force	
Murder of Rasalingam Sooriyaprabakaran, 18	2 January 2000	Iruthayapuram, Batticaloa	1		Army	According to pro-rebel TamilNet
Murder of Jabir	15 February 2000	Kinniya, Trincomalee	1		Police	According to pro-rebel TamilNet
Navy attack on Tamil village of Salli	25 February 2000	Salli, Trincomalee		8 houses burned, villagers assaulted	Navy	According to pro-rebel TamilNet
Pallikuda bombing	12 May 2000	Pallikuda, Kilinochchi	5		Air Force	
Silivaturai massacre	13 May 2000	Silivaturai	5		Navy	
Columbuthurai massacre	15 May 2000	Columbuthurai, Jaffna	5		Army	
Bombing of Poonthoddam village	2 July 2000	Poonthoddam, Vavuniya	1		Air Force	According to pro-rebel TamilNet
Kaddumurivu murders	17 July 2000	Kaddumurivu, Batticaloa	2		Army	According to pro-rebel TamilNet
Morokkoddaanchenai murders	9 August 2000	Morokkoddaanchenai, Batticaloa	2		Army	According to pro-rebel TamilNet
Bindunuwewa massacre	25 October 2000	Bindunuwewa	25		Mobs, Police, Army	
Murder of Shanmugaraja Swarnahasan and Mahalingam Thamiran	14 December 2000	Iqbal Nagar, Trincomalee	2		Navy	According to pro-rebel TamilNet
Murder of Arulanantham Kamalanathan (29), and Sinnathamby Sivakumar	14 December 2000	Poovarasankulam, Vavuniya	2		Army	According to pro-rebel TamilNet
Murder of Vasanthi Ganeshamoorthy, 16	17 December 2000	Eravur, Batticaloa	1		Police	According to pro-rebel TamilNet
Mirusuvil massacre	20 December 2000	Mirusuvil, Jaffna	8		Army	
Bombing of Trincomalee Tamil villages	22 January 2001	Chenaiyur, Kaddaiparichchan, Sampur and Sudaikuda, Trincomalee			Air Force	According to pro-rebel TamilNet
Murder of Uthayakumar	28 February 2001	Tharapuram, Mannar	1		Navy	
Bombing of Kombavil and Puthukudiyiruppu villages	16 March 2001	Kombavil, Puthukkudiyiruppu			Air Force	According to pro-rebel TamilNet
Bombing of Chundikulam and Puthumaathalan villages	21 March 2001	Chundikulam, Puthumaathalan, Mullaitivu	6		Air Force	According to pro-rebel TamilNet
Bombing of Soodaikkudah village	15 April 2001	Soodaikkudah, Trincomalee			Air Force	According to pro-rebel TamilNet
Knifing of Sinnathamby Kandaiah	29 September 2001	Jaffna			Army	According to pro-rebel TamilNet
Attack on Tamil civilians in Nilaveli	30 April 2002	Nilaveli, Trincomalee		2 injured	Navy	According to pro-rebel TamilNet
Murder of Ponnar Gnaneswaran	7 January 2003	Thondamanaru, Jaffna	1		Navy	According to pro-rebel TamilNet
Bombing of Kiran Methodist Church	27 April 2005	Kiran, Batticaloa			Air Force	According to pro-rebel TamilNet
2005 Inuvil shooting and protests	4 August 2005	Inuvil, Jaffna	1		Army	
Murder of Tamil civilian protestor	28 October 2005	Puthur East, Jaffna	1		Army	According to pro-rebel TamilNet
Murder of Sellathamby Punniyamoorthy	2 November 2005	Valaichenai, Batticaloa	1		TMVP	According to pro-rebel TamilNet
Disappearances of Uthayan Selvarajah, Subramaniam Kanapathipillai and S. Leethan	6 November 2005	Kaluwankerny, Batticaloa	3		TMVP	According to pro-rebel TamilNet
Murder of two Jaffna farmers	1 December 2005	Neerveli, Jaffna	2		Army	According to pro-rebel TamilNet
Murders of Yogarasa Yogeswary and Thurairasa Vathany	8 December 2005	Palacholai, Batticaloa	2		TMVP	According to pro-rebel TamilNet
Murder and rape of Ilaiyathambi Tharsini	16 December 2005	Pungudutivu, Jaffna	1		Navy	
Pesalai massacre	23 December 2005	Pesalai, Mannar	4		Navy	
Killing of Markandu Pushpamalar	24 December 2005	Chavakachcheri, Jaffna	1		Army	
Murders of two Tamil youth in Santhiveli	26 December 2005	Santhiveli, Batticaloa	2		TMVP	According to pro-rebel TamilNet
Murders of Kilinochchi civilians	27 December 2005	Kilinochchi, Kanakarayankulam, Pallai	5		Army	According to pro-rebel TamilNet
Murders of Tamil civilians at Mutthirai Junction	28 December 2005	Nallur, Jaffna	2		Army	According to pro-rebel TamilNet
2006-2007 disappearances of Tamils	2006-2007	Northern Province, Eastern Province, Colombo	Hundreds	most feared dead	Government forces	
Disappearance of Tamil youth Kandasamy Ilamaran	2006	Omanthai, Vavuniya	1		Army	
Trincomalee student massacre	2 January 2006	Trincomalee	5		Police (STF)	
Murder of Rasaratnam Kuganenthiran	5 January 2006	Kiran, Batticaloa	1		Army	According to pro-rebel TamilNet
Murder of Kumutha Mahenthiran	6 January 2006	Batticaloa	1		Army	According to pro-rebel TamilNet
Murder of Kandasamy Shanmuganathan	8 January 2006	Thevapuram, Batticaloa	1		Army	According to pro-rebel TamilNet
Disappearance of Rajeevmohan	10 January 2006	Ilavalai, Jaffna	1		Army	According to pro-rebel TamilNet
Murder of P. Sivasankar	11 January 2006	Meesalai, Jaffna	1		Army	According to pro-rebel TamilNet
Murder of Thambu Nadesu	11 January 2006	Puthur, Jaffna	1		Army	According to pro-rebel TamilNet
Murder of Tamil civilian traveler	11 January 2006	Kokkuvil, Jaffna	1		Army	According to pro-rebel TamilNet
Murder of farmer S. Thanabalasingham	12 January 2006	Lingapuram, Trincomalee	1		Army	According to pro-rebel TamilNet
Murder of Sellathurai Yogarajah	15 January 2006	Kodikamam, Jaffna	1		Army	According to pro-rebel TamilNet
Murders of Bojan family members	16 January 2006	Manipay, Jaffna	3		Army	
Murder of Thurairajah Ravichandran	21 January 2006	Kayts, Jaffna	1		EPDP, Army	
2006 murder of TRO workers	31 January 2006	Batticaloa	7		TMVP	
Shooting of Kailasapillai Raveendran	20 February 2006	Vantharomoolai, Batticaloa			TMVP	According to pro-rebel TamilNet
Murder of Navarasan	20 February 2006	Kiran, Batticaloa	1		TMVP	According to pro-rebel TamilNet
Serial killings and disappearances of 62 Tamil civilians	3 March 2006 - 21 April 2006	Jaffna, Trincomalee, Batticaloa, Mannar	62		Army, TMVP	According to pro-rebel NESOHR
Murder of Kovinthan Vijeyarasa	9 March 2006	Eravur, Batticaloa	1		TMVP	According to pro-rebel TamilNet
Abduction of 16 Tamil youth in Batticaloa	13 March 2006 - 14 March 2006	Valaichennai, Vaharai, Batticaloa			TMVP	According to pro-rebel TamilNet
Indiscriminate firing on over 2000 Tamil civilians in Trincomalee villages	20 March 2006	Sampur, Soodaikuda, Koonitivu, and Kadatkarachchenai, Trincomalee			Navy	According to pro-rebel TamilNet
Murder of Kulathunga Regikanth	25 March 2006	Valaichenai, Batticaloa	1		TMVP	According to pro-rebel TamilNet
2006 anti-Tamil riots in Trincomalee	12 April 2006	Trincomalee	19		Sinhalese mobs, Navy, Army	
Murder of Ramalingam Sakilan	17 April 2006	Meesalai, Jaffna	1		Army	According to pro-rebel TamilNet
Murder of Mr. Easan	17 April 2006	Santhiveli, Batticaloa	1		TMVP	According to pro-rebel TamilNet
Murder of mason Thiyagarasa Thaskumar	18 April 2006	Mavadivembu, Batticaloa	1		TMVP	According to pro-rebel TamilNet
Vatharavathai massacre	19 April 2006	Vatharavathai, Jaffna	5		Army	According to pro-rebel TamilNet
Murder of Tamil youth in Kanniya	20 April 2006	Kanniya, Trincomalee	1		Army	According to pro-rebel TamilNet
Murder of Pakkiaraja Baskaran	22 April 2006	Barathipuram, Batticaloa	1		Army	According to pro-rebel TamilNet
Kanthasamy Nallammah murder	22 April 2006	Kavatikudah, Trincomalee	1		Gunmen aligned with the government	According to pro-rebel TamilNet
Claymore mine attack in Mannar	22 April 2006	Pandivirichchan, Mannar	2		Army	According to pro-rebel TamilNet
Murder of Manickam Rajeevan	24 April 2006	Jaffna	1		Army	According to pro-rebel TamilNet
Murder of Kanagaratnam Lingeswaran	24 April 2006	Valaichenai, Batticaloa	1		Gunmen aligned with the government	According to pro-rebel TamilNet
Murder of Rasanayagam Jegan	24 April 2006	Vavuniya	1		Gunmen aligned with the government	
Attack on Muthur villages by SL Navy, Army, and Air Force	25 April 2006	Trincomalee	16		SL Navy, Army, and SLAF	According to pro-rebel TamilNet
Murder of Senthilnathan in Vavuniya	26 April 2006	Vavuniya	1		Gunmen aligned with the government	According to pro-rebel TamilNet
Murder of Tamil civilian male	1 May 2006	Jaffna	1		SL Navy	
Attack on Uthayan Daily Press Office	2 May 2006	Jaffna	2		Army	
Jaffna civilian youths massacre	4 May 2006	Jaffna	7		Army	
Manthuvil massacre	8 May 2006	Manthuvil, Jaffna	8		Army	
Aerial bombardment in Vanni	11 May 2006	Kilinochchi - Mullaithivu		2 civilians wounded	Sri Lankan Air Force	According to pro-rebel TamilNet
Murder of Seenithamby Yogeswaran	11 May 2006	Batticaloa	1		TMVP	
Abduction of six youths	11 May 2006	Jaffna	6		Army	According to pro-rebel TamilNet
Allaipiddy massacre	13 May 2006	Allaipiddy, Jaffna	13		Navy, EPDP	
Murder of Parameswaran Kapilan	14 May 2006	Kopay, Jaffna	1		Army	According to pro-rebel TamilNet
Murder of Thiyakarajah Kirupaharan and Jeyaratnam Jeyakanthan	14 May 2006	Nilavarai, Jaffna	2		Army	According to pro-rebel TamilNet
Murder of Arunachalam Suresh Gunapalan	22 May 2006	Vidathalpallai near Muhamalai, Jaffna	1		Army	
Murder of Chandran Linton and Rasarathinam Mohan	22 May 2006	Periya Pandivirichan, Mannar	2		Army	According to pro-rebel TamilNet
Murder of Tamil youth in Chenkalady	23 May 2006	Chenkalady, Batticaloa	1		Army	According to pro-rebel TamilNet
Murder of Puvanendran Bolder Mayooran	26 May 2006	Ariyalai, Jaffna	1		Army	
Murder of Ratnam Ratnarajah	26 May 2006	Kalviyankadu, Batticaloa	1		TMVP	According to pro-rebel TamilNet
Murder of school boys Kanapathy Balu and Vinayagamoorthy Nanthan	27 May 2006	Thikiliveddai, Batticaloa	2		Army	According to pro-rebel TamilNet
Murder of communications center owner Sabesan	28 May 2006	Vaddukkodai, Jaffna	1		Gunmen aligned with the government	According to pro-rebel TamilNet
Murder of Suntharalingam Ravichandran	29 May 2006	Iruthayapuram, Batticaloa	1		Army	According to pro-rebel TamilNet
Murder of Nagarajah Selvarajah and Nadarajah Nageswaran	29 May 2006	Valikamam, Jaffna	2		Navy	According to pro-rebel TamilNet
Abduction and disappearance of Selvarajah Gajanathan	2 June 2006	Kaddaiparichchan, Trincomalee	1		Army	According to pro-rebel TamilNet
Murder of Mr. Nalliah Vimalendran and Thambirajah Sithiravadeivel	3 June 2006	Batticaloa	2		Army	According to pro-rebel TamilNet
Murder of Sivalingam Rajanikanth	6 June 2006	Batticaloa	1		Gunmen aligned with the government	According to pro-rebel TamilNet
Nedunkal pressure mine attack	7 June 2006	Nedunkal, Batticaloa	10		Army	According to pro-LTTE TamilNet
Vankalai massacre	8 June 2006	Vankalai, Mannar	4		Army	
Abduction of 6 Tamil students	9 June 2006	Batticaloa			Gunmen aligned with the government	According to pro-rebel TamilNet
Murder of Kathirgamathamby Mathivanan and Mohamed Remis	10 June 2006	Trincomalee	2		Army	According to pro-rebel TamilNet
Murder of N. Balasingam	12 June 2006	Vavuniya	1		Army	According to pro-rebel TamilNet
Murder of Batticaloa Tamil civilian	14 June 2006	Natrapaalathadi, Batticaloa	1		Gunmen aligned with the government	According to pro-rebel TamilNet
Murder of Tamil civilians in Trincomalee	16 June 2006	Periyakulam	3		Army	According to pro-rebel TamilNet
Murder of Kathamuthu Rajanayagam	13 June 2006	Santhiveli, Batticaloa	1		Army	According to pro-rebel TamilNet
Pesalai Church attack	17 June 2006	Pesalai, Mannar	6		Navy	
Murder of Iyathurai Nirmalakumaran	20 June 2006	Kommathurai, Batticaloa	1		TMVP	According to pro-rebel TamilNet
Abduction and disappearance of Thayaparan Subaraj	21 June 2006	Kattankudi, Batticaloa	1		TMVP	According to pro-rebel TamilNet
Disappearance of Kanesan Sivanesan	29 June 2006	Inuvil, Jaffna	1		Army	According to pro-rebel TamilNet
Murder of Tamil civilian in Sambaltivu	30 June 2006	Sambaltivu junction, Trincomalee	1		Army	According to pro-rebel TamilNet
Murder of Sathasivam Mathuri	30 June 2006	Athiyady, Jaffna	1		Army, EPDP	According to pro-LTTE TamilNet
Murder of Gnanasekaram Santhiran	30 June 2006	Chenkalady, Batticaloa	1		Army	According to pro-LTTE TamilNet
Abduction of Krishnapillai Kamalanathan	2 July 2006	Valaichchenai, Batticaloa	1		TMVP	According to pro-LTTE TamilNet
Murder in Kaluwanchikudy	3 July 2006	Kaluwanchikudy, Batticaloa	1		Police	According to pro-rebel TamilNet
Murder of unidentified Tamil man	3 July 2006	Thandikulam HSZ, Vavuniya	1		Army	According to pro-rebel TamilNet
Abduction and disappearance of 35 Tamil children	7 July 2006 to 8 July 2006	Thivuchenai, Karuppalai, Pethalai, Sorivil, Sevanapitty, Batticaloa			TMVP	According to pro-LTTE TamilNet
Abduction of 3 Tamil youths from Pethalai village	8 July 2006	Valaichenai, Batticaloa			Gunmen aligned with the government	According to pro-LTTE TamilNet
Murder of Seenithamby Sellan	10 July 2006	Batticaloa	1		TMVP	According to pro-LTTE TamilNet
Murder of two Tamil civilian youths	10 July 2006	Mannar	2		Army	According to pro-rebel TamilNet
Murder of youth in Batticaloa	14 July 2006	Batticaloa	1		TMVP	According to pro-rebel TamilNet
Murder of Arumugam Kalakaran	16 July 2006	Kalkudah, Paddiyadichenai, Valaichchenai, Batticaloa	1		TMVP	According to pro-LTTE TamilNet
Disappearance of Nadarasha Surendran, Shanmugam Ariyan, and Kanthashamy Mohanraj	17 July 2006	Paddiyadychenai, Valaichenai, Batticaloa	3		TMVP	According to pro-LTTE TamilNet
Murder of Nadarajah Ravindrakumar and Krishnapillai Srikrishnan	20 July 2006	Inuvil junction and Irupalai, Jaffna	2		GoSL-controlled paramilitaries	According to pro-LTTE TamilNet
Murder of Sindathurai Christy Anton	20 July 2006	Manatkulam Junction, Mannar	1		Army	According to pro-LTTE TamilNet
Disappearance of Rasathurai Inthirarajah	23 July 2006	Jaffna	1		Gunmen aligned with the government	According to pro-LTTE TamilNet
Murder of two Tamil civilians	26 July 2006	Jaffna	2		Army	According to pro-rebel TamilNet
Murder of Sriskandarajah Lavan, and injury of Murukaiah Sivanandan and Kathriththamby Murukesan	26 July 2006	Punnalaikadduvan South, Jaffna	1		Paramilitary operatives collaborating with the SLA	According to pro-LTTE TamilNet
Batticaloa-Trincomalee ambulance attack	3 August 2006	Seruvila, Trincomalee District	3		Army	According to pro-rebel TamilNet
Indiscriminate artillery fire of Muttur	4 August 2006	Trincomalee	22		Army	According to pro-rebel TamilNet
SLA shelling in Batticaloa	4 August 2006	Batticaloa	3		Army	According to pro-rebel TamilNet<
Murder of Pon. Ganeshamoorthy	4 August 2006	Thirunelvely, Jaffna	1		Army	According to pro-LTTE TamilNet
Trincomalee massacre of NGO workers / Muttur massacre, Trincomalee District	4 August 2006	Muttur	17		Police, Muslim Home Guards, Navy	
Murder of Kaththamuthu Perinaparasa	5 August 2006	Kiliveddy, Muttur, Trincomalee District	1		Army	According to pro-LTTE TamilNet
Shelling of Nallur and Upooral villages	6 August 2006	Muttur and Eachchilampathu, Trincomalee District	15		Army and Navy	According to pro-rebel TamilNet
Ambulance shelling	6 August 2006	Pachchanoor, Muttur-Batticaloa road	1		Army	According to pro-rebel TamilNet
Valaichchenai murder of Kanapathipillai Kamalanathan	7 August 2006	Kurinchi Nagar, Valaichchenai, Batticaloa	1		TMVP working with Army	According to pro-LTTE TamilNet
Murder of Kandasamy Govindarajah	9 August 2006	Meeravodai, Kalodavi, Batticaloa	1		TMVP with security cover by Army and Police	According to pro-LTTE TamilNet
Killing of Tamil civilians in Kathiraveli	10 August 2006	Kathiraveli and surrounding villages, Batticaloa	50	200 injured, and over 1,000 displaced	Air Force and Army	According to pro-rebel TamilNet
Disappearance of Tamil civilians by GoSL-controlled Karuna paramilitaries	11 August 2006 - 13 August 2006	Batticaloa	15		Army and TMVP	According to pro-rebel TamilNet
Artillery attack on Jaffna Hindu devotees	12 August 2006	Near Muhamalai, Jaffna	7		Army	According to pro-rebel TamilNet
St. Philip Neri Church shelling	13 August 2006	Allaipiddy, Jaffna	40		Army	
Chencholai bombing	14 August 2006	Mullaitivu	61		Air Force	
Uthayan delivery van attack	15 August 2006	Puthur junction near Atchchuveli, Jaffna	1		Army	According to pro-rebel TamilNet
Alayadivembu killings	16 August 2006	Alayadivembu Ward No: 8, Akkaraipattu Police division, Ampara	3		Special Task Force	According to pro-rebel TamilNet
Murder of 2 Tamil men	19 August 2006	Karaveddy, Vadamarachchi East, Jaffna	2		Army	According to pro-rebel TamilNet
Killings of Catholic priest Fr. Jim Brown and Wenceslaus Vimalathas	20 August 2006	Allaipiddy, Jaffna	2		Navy	
Sampoor shelling and bombing	28 August 2006	Sampoor, Trincomalee	20		Army and Air Force	According to pro-rebel TamilNet
Murder of Periyathamby Veluppillai	30 August 2006	Batticaloa	1		Army and TMVP	According to pro-LTTE TamilNet
Murder of K.Thavarajah	30 August 2006	Batticaloa	1		Army	According to pro-LTTE TamilNet
Abduction and murder of 16 Tamil youths	31 August 2006	Pattaniyoor, Nelukkulam, Sundarapuram, and Maravankulam, Batticaloa	16		Army	According to pro-rebel TamilNet
Murder of Thiayagarajah Senthooran, Shanmuganathan Nagendran and Kandiah Karunakaran	4 September 2006	Valaichenai-Kalkudah police division in Batticaloa district	3		TMVP and Army	According to pro-LTTE TamilNet
Batticaloa paramilitary shootings	4 September 2006	Valaichchenai-Kalkudah, Batticaloa	3		Army and paramilitary gunmen	According to pro-rebel TamilNet
Jaffna civilian shootings	4 September 2006	Jaffna	3		Army	
Murder of Krishnapillai Sivananthan	5 September 2006	Mavadivembu, Batticaloa	1		TMVP	According to pro-LTTE TamilNet
Kathiraveli MBRL attack	5 September 2006	Kathiraveli, Batticaloa	3		Army	
Jaffna multiple murders	8 September 2006	Jaffna	5		Army	According to pro-rebel TamilNet
2006 Jaffna multiple murders	15 September 2006	Iuduvil, Innuvil, Anaikoddai, Kalviyankadu	7	1 injured	Army or GoSL controlled paramilitaries	According to pro-rebel TamilNet
Multiple civilian murders by GoSL agents in Jaffna and Kalviankadu	15-16 September 2006	Various locations	6		Army and GoSL agents	According to pro-LTTE TamilNet
Murder of Murukesu Sivarasa	17 September 2006	Nasivanthivu, Valaichenai, Batticaloa	1		Army	According to pro-LTTE TamilNet
Murder of Shanmuganathan Sureshkumar and Selvarajah Shanthakumar	18 September 2006	Kondavil, Karaveddi, Jaffna	2		Army	According to pro-LTTE TamilNet
Disappearance of three Batticaloa Tamil youth	19 September 2006	Santhiveli, Batticaloa			Army and TMVP	According to pro-LTTE TamilNet
Murder of teacher Thirunavukarasu Sivagnaselvam (32)	11 October 2006	Valaichchenai, Batticaloa	1		Army	
Shooting of two youth in Jaffna	11 October 2006	Vadamarachchi, Jaffna	2		Army	
Kaiveli bombing	16 October 2006	Kaiveli, Mullaitivu	2	15 wounded	Air Force	
Vaharai mortar attack	2 November 2006	Vaharai, Batticaloa	2		Army	
Killing of Mary Theresa Anton (49)	2 November 2006	Kilinochchi	1		Air Force	
Kilinochchi bombing	2 November 2006	Kilinochchi	5		Air Force	
Vaharai Bombing / Vaharai Shelling	7 November 2006	Kathiraveli, Batticaloa	47	160 injured	Army	
Massacre at Thandikulam	19 November 2006	Thandikulam, Vavuniya	5		Police, Army	
Padahuthurai bombing / Illuppaikadavai bombing	2 January 2007	Illuppaikadavai, Mannar	16		Air Force	
Murders of Tharmalingam Ganesalingam (59) and Vetrivel Mahendran (52)	5 January 2007	Nedunkerny, Vavuniya	2	2 wounded	Army	According to pro-rebel TamilNet
Vaharai massacre	8 January 2007	Vaharai, Batticaloa	3	11 wounded	Army	According to pro-rebel TamilNet
Murder of Yogarajah Nixon (23)	9 January 2007	Nanaddan, Mannar	1		Army	According to pro-rebel TamilNet
Verugal bombing	9 January 2007	Verugal, Trincomalee	2	9 wounded	Army	According to pro-rebel TamilNet
Murder of Gracian Panumathy (34)	21 January 2007	Alvai, Jaffna	1	2 injured	Army	According to pro-rebel TamilNet
Murder of Sinnarajah Suresh (18)	17 February 2007	Kumankulam, Vavuniya	1	2 wounded	Army	According to pro-rebel TamilNet
Murder of Mohammad Cassim (60)	19 February 2007	Eravur, Batticaloa	9	1 injured	Police	According to pro-rebel TamilNet
Murder of student Krishnan Kamalathas (24)	19 February 2007	Jaffna	1		Army	According to pro-rebel TamilNet
Parasankulam bombing	20 February 2007	Parasankulam, Vavuniya	2	1 wounded	Air Force	According to pro-rebel TamilNet
Murder of Siluvairasa Amalanesan (33)	27 February 2007	Madhu, Mannar	1	1 wounded	Army	According to pro-rebel TamilNet
Murder of Rasenthiram Ilanchelvan (32)	28 February 2007	Chavakachcheri, Jaffna	1		Army	According to pro-rebel TamilNet
Murder of T. Nirojan (14	1 March 2007	Vantharumoolai, Batticaloa	1		Army	According to pro-rebel TamilNet
Mannar mass killings	January 2007-February 2007	Mannar	55		Armed Forces	According to pro-rebel TamilNet
Mannar killings	13 March 2007	Mannar	2		Army	According to pro-rebel TamilNet
Siththaandi massacre	30 March 2007	Siththaandi, Batticaloa	9		Army	According to pro-rebel TamilNet
Murder of G. Manoharan (24)	31 March 2007	Manatkadu, Jaffna	1		Army	According to pro-rebel TamilNet
Murders of civilian cyclists in Vavuniya	3 April 2007	Vavuniya	2		Army	According to pro-rebel TamilNet
Mullaitivu bombing	4 April 2007	Mullaitivu	2	4 injured	Air Force	According to pro-rebel TamilNet
Murders of Raveendran Ravi (54) and Sindhu Ravi (42)	5 April 2007	Paalampiddi, Vavuniya	2		Army	According to pro-rebel TamilNet
Piramanalankulam massacre	8 April 2007	Piramanalankulam, Vavuniya	8	25 injured	Army	According to pro-rebel TamilNet
Murders of Chandrakumar Rajakopal (20), Arulappu Ketheeswaran (48) and Subramaniam Chandramathy (68)	11 April 2007	Vavuniya	3		Paramilitaries working for Army	According to pro-rebel TamilNet
Murder of baby Saththary Thilliampalam	15 April 2007	Paduvankarai, Batticaloa	1		Army	According to pro-rebel TamilNet
Andiyapuliayankulam massacre	24 April 2007	Andiyapuliayankulam, Mannar	4	37 injured	Army	According to pro-rebel TamilNet
Murder of fisherman Rasappu Yogendran (52)	28 April 2007	Jaffna	1		Army	According to pro-rebel TamilNet
Murder of Mudippillaiyaar Hindu Temple priest	29 April 2007	Velanai, Jaffna	1		Army	According to pro-LTTE TamilNet
Murder of Sinnathurai Sujijeyanthiran (19)	1 May 2007	Palaali, Jaffna	1		Army	According to pro-rebel TamilNet
Murder of Nagarasa Wijayakumar (32)	14 May 2007	Cha'ndilipaay, Jaffna	1		Army	According to pro-rebel TamilNet
Murder of student Kanakaratnam Mohanraj	16 May 2007	Poonakari, Jaffna	1		Army	According to pro-rebel TamilNet
Murders of Fishermen in Kayts	18 May 2007	Kayts, Jaffna	2		Navy	According to pro-rebel TamilNet
Murders of Nathiya Selvarajah (22) and Kobi Selvarajah (24)	24 May 2007	Kugnchukku'lam, Vavuniya	2		Army	According to pro-rebel TamilNet
Puthukkudiyiruppu bombing	29 May 2007	Puthukkudiyiruppu, Mullaitivu	1	2 injured	Air Force	According to pro-rebel TamilNet
Murder of Balasubramaniam	30 May 2007	Iyakkachchi, Jaffna	1		Army	According to pro-rebel TamilNet
Batticaloa shootings	12 June 2007	Batticaloa	5		Army	According to pro-rebel TamilNet
Murder of Aseervatham Mariyathas (41)	18 June 2007	Vadamaraadchi east, Jaffna	1		Army	According to pro-rebel TamilNet
Kizhavankulam massacre	10 July 2007	Kizhavankulam, Kilinochchi	5	1 wounded	Army	According to pro-rebel TamilNet
Alampil bombing	11 July 2007	Alampil, Mullaitivu	2	11 wounded	Air Force	According to pro-rebel TamilNet
Meesaalai shooting	18 July 2007	Meesaalai, Jaffna	1	1 injured	Army	According to pro-rebel TamilNet
Kaithadi killings	13 August 2007	Kaithadi, Jaffna	8		Army	According to pro-rebel TamilNet
Maruthoadai Tamil mixed School bombing	13 August 2007	Maruthoadai, Vavuniya	1	School destroyed, couple wounded. Cooperative Society building, a rice mill and two houses also damaged	Air Force	According to pro-rebel TamilNet
Paasiththenral massacre	1 September 2007	Paasiththenral, Mannar	12		Army	According to pro-rebel TamilNet
Murder of Sellathurai Yohan (34)	3 September 2007	Mannar	3	1 seriously wounded	Army	According to pro-rebel TamilNet
Murder of fisherman V. Inpanathan (41)	9 September 2007	Vadamarachchi, Jaffna	1	2 fishing boats destroyed	Navy	According to pro-rebel TamilNet
Murder of Thambu Vairamuththu (85)	22 September 2007	Visuvamadu, Kilinochchi	1	12 wounded	Air Force	According to pro-rebel TamilNet
Mannar refugee boat massacre	18 October 2007	Mannar	3	3 seriously wounded	Army	According to pro-rebel TamilNet
Periyamadu massacre	25 October 2007	Periyamadu, Mannar	3	9 wounded	Army	According to pro-rebel TamilNet
Murder of Surendini Imanuel (33)	1 November 2007	Murungkan, Mannar	1		Army	According to pro-rebel TamilNet
Murder of S. Roobi (32)	24 November 2007	Mu'rika'ndi, Kilinochchi	1	One other injured	Air Force	According to pro-rebel TamilNet
Tharmapuram massacre	25 November 2007	Tharmapuram, Kilinochchi	4	6 injured	Air Force	According to pro-rebel TamilNet
Murder of Tamil civilians at Oddisuddaan	25 November 2007	Oddisuddaan, Mullaitivu	2		Army	According to pro-rebel TamilNet
Massacre of school girls at Iyangkea'ni	27 November 2007	Iyangkea'ni, Kilinochchi	7		Army	According to pro-rebel TamilNet
Massacre of civilians near VoT radio station	27 November 2007	Kilinochchi	11	15 injured	Air Force	According to pro-rebel TamilNet
Murder of pregnant woman Kamalraj Thanayogam (18)	4 December 2007	Tharmapuram, Kilinochchi	1	One injured	Air Force	According to pro-rebel TamilNet
Murder of Pastor Nallathamby Gnanaseelan	3 January 2008	Jaffna	1		Army	
Poonakari bombing	8 January 2008	Poonakari, Kilinochchi	2	Houses destroyed and damaged	Army	According to pro-rebel TamilNet
Murder of Murugiah Logeswaran (32)	17 January 2008	Kanakapuram, Kilinochchi	1	7 wounded	Air Force	According to pro-rebel TamilNet
Murder of Azhakar Maarimuttu (63)	25 January 2008	Viveakananthaa Nakar, Kilinochchi	1	2 injured	Air Force	According to pro-rebel TamilNet
Manduvil massacre	31 January 2008	Manduvil, Jaffna	3		Army	According to pro-rebel TamilNet
Poonakari massacre	22 February 2008	Poonakari, Kilinochchi	8	3 houses destroyed, many more damaged	Air Force	According to pro-rebel TamilNet
Murders of fishmongers Vadivelu (31) and Ravi Geed (25)	26 February 2008	Akkaraipattu, Ampara	2		STF	According to pro-rebel TamilNet
Massacre of Tamil civilians by Deep Penetration Unit	27 February 2008	Mullaitivu	8		Army	According to pro-rebel TamilNet
Murder of Selvarajah Kodeeswaran	14 March 2008	Jaffna	1	1 wounded	Navy	According to pro-rebel TamilNet
Murder of Mahalingam Sasikumar	18 March 2008	Poonakari, Kilinochchi	1		Army	According to pro-rebel TamilNet
Murders of Sivananthan Uthayakumar (38) and Chinnavan Masilamany (32)	7 April 2008	Vavu'natheevu, Batticaloa	2		STF	According to pro-rebel TamilNet
Murders of Rasanayagam Shantharoopan	9 April 2008	Jaffna	1		Army	According to pro-rebel TamilNet
Murders of Thuraiappa Nadarasa (50)	11 April 2008	Poonakari, Kilinochchi	1	2 houses destroyed	Air Force	According to pro-rebel TamilNet
Murder of Anchalas Sulaksana (15)	17 April 2008	Visuvamadu, Mullaitivu	1		Air Force	According to pro-rebel TamilNet
Murder of S. Ukanthan (18)	21 April 2008	Alampil, Mullaitivu	1	7 seriously injured	Air Force	According to pro-rebel TamilNet
Murder of Nakalingam Shanumgarajah (52)	30 April 2008	Nedungkea'ni, Mullaitivu	1	1 wounded	Army	According to pro-rebel TamilNet
Murukandy claymore attack	23 May 2008	Murukandy, Kilinochchi	16		Army	According to pro-LTTE TamilNet
Murders of R. Vijith (3) and P. Kayalvili (14)	23 May 2008	Vadamaraadchi East, Jaffna	6	1 wounded	Air Force	According to pro-LTTE TamilNet
Shelling of Jaffna coastal villages	29 May 2008	Jaffna	6	12 injured	Army	According to pro-LTTE TamilNet
Puthoor massacre	2 June 2008	Puthoor, Mullaitivu	6	4 wounded	Army	According to pro-rebel TamilNet
Murders of A. Jeyaseelan (45) and I. Tharmeswaran (24)	5 June 2008	Maanthai East, Mullaitivu	2		Army	According to pro-rebel TamilNet
Puthukkudiyiruppu bombing	15 June 2008	Puthukkudiyiruppu, Mullaitivu	4	10 injured	Air Force	According to pro-rebel TamilNet
Kaluthaavalai killings	22 June 2008	Kaluthaavalai, Batticaloa	2	15 wounded	STF	According to pro-rebel TamilNet
Murder of IDP P. Sriharan	22 June 2008	Mallavi, Mullaitivu	1		Army	According to pro-rebel TamilNet
Murder of fish vendor Maruthamuthu Kaalichelvam (31)	25 June 2008	Nedungkea'ni, Vavuniya	1		Police	According to pro-rebel TamilNet
Murder of student Senaathirajah Senthooran (16)	25 June 2008	Nedungkea'ni, Mullaitivu	1	4 wounded	Army	According to pro-rebel TamilNet
Murder of Divisional Secretary (AGA) Mr. N. Nanthakumar, 36	29 June 2008	Thu'nukkaay, Mullaitivu	1		Army	According to pro-rebel TamilNet
Murder of student R. Jeevithan	3 July 2008	Mallavi, Mullaitivu	1		Army	According to pro-rebel TamilNet
Murder of Ponnuthurai Vijayaratnam (32)	21 July 2008	Ilavalai, Jaffna	2		Army	According to pro-rebel TamilNet
Theavanpiddi shelling	27 July 2008	Mannar	1	2 wounded	Air Force	According to pro-rebel TamilNet
Vadmaraadchi East shelling	6 August 2008	Jaffna	2	1 injured	Air Force	According to pro-rebel TamilNet
Mullaitivu shelling	8 August 2008	Mullaitivu	1	16 injured	Air Force	According to pro-rebel TamilNet
Murder of S. Nadarasa (56)	8 August 2008	Nedungkea'ni, Mullaitivu	1		Army	According to pro-rebel TamilNet
Iranaippaalai bombing	9 August 2008	Iranaippaalai, Mullaitivu	2	4 wounded	Air Force	According to pro-rebel TamilNet
Vanneari shelling	9 August 2008	Vanneari, Kilinochchi	1		Army	According to pro-rebel TamilNet
Visuvamadu bombing	10 August 2008	Visuvamadu, Mullaitivu	1	6 wounded	Air Force	According to pro-rebel TamilNet
Kumulamunai shelling	12 August 2008	Kumulamunai, Mullaitivu	1	2 injured	Army	According to pro-rebel TamilNet
Thunukkaay claymore attack	27 August 2008	Thunukkaay, Kilinochchi	2		Army	According to pro-rebel TamilNet
Olumadu claymore attack	29 August 2008	Olumadu, Mullaitivu	2		Army	According to pro-rebel TamilNet
Puthumurippu massacre	30 August 2008	Puthumurippu, Kilinochchi	5	3 critically injured	Army	According to pro-rebel TamilNet
Vavuniya claymore attack	5 September 2008	Kurichuddakulam, Vavuniya	1	1 injured	Army	According to pro-LTTE TamilNet
Murder of Samithamby Kanthappoadi	7 September 2008	Eruvil, Batticaloa	1		TMVP	According to pro-LTTE TamilNet
Kumulamunai shelling	8 September 2008	Kumulamunai, Mullaitivu	1	1 injured	Army	According to pro-rebel TamilNet
Bombing of passenger bus on A9 road	18 September 2008	Pothoor, Kilinochchi	3	5 injured	Army	According to pro-rebel TamilNet
Murder of A. Krishnaveny (47), mother of two	19 September 2008	Visuvamadu, Mullaitivu	1	2 injured	Air Force	According to pro-rebel TamilNet
Murder of trader Visvalingam Thambirasa	26 September 2008	Mandur, Batticaloa	1		STF	According to pro-LTTE TamilNet
Iraththinapuram bombing	27 September 2008	Iraththinapuram, Kilinochchi	1	8 wounded, including 4 children	Air Force	According to pro-rebel TamilNet
Kilinochchi bombing	1 October 2008	Kilinochchi	2	13 wounded	Air Force	According to pro-rebel TamilNet
Paranthan bombing	10 October 2008	Paranthan, Kilinochchi	3	6 wounded	Air Force	According to pro-rebel TamilNet
Murder of Subramaniam Tharmenthiran (45)	10 October 2008	Thenmaraadchi, Jaffna	1		Army	According to pro-rebel TamilNet
Thirukkoayil massacre	16 October 2008	Thirukkoayil, Ampara	4		STF	According to pro-rebel TamilNet
Kilinochchi bombing	25 October 2008	Kilinochchi	2		Army	According to pro-rebel TamilNet
Murder of Muniyandi Chandranayagam	30 October 2008	Iraththinapuram, Kilinochchi	1		Army	According to pro-rebel TamilNet
Murder of Selvarasa Satheeskaran	30 October 2008	Puthukkudiyiruppu, Mullaitivu	1	1 injured	Army	According to pro-rebel TamilNet
Murder of P. Packiyaluxmy	5 November 2008	Puthukkudiyiruppu, Mullaitivu	1		Army	According to pro-rebel TamilNet
Murder of Tamil father in Nedunkerny	10 November 2008	Nedunkerny, Vavuniya	1		Army	According to pro-rebel TamilNet
Murder of Thillainathan Aroakkiyanathan	16 November 2008	Kollar Pu'liyangku'lam, Mullaitivu	1		Army	According to pro-rebel TamilNet
Murder of 24 year old Tamil youth in Paranthan	17 November 2008	Paranthan, Kilinochchi	1		Army	According to pro-rebel TamilNet
Murder of Marumenthirarasa Naguleswaran (12), his father Marumenthirarasa (53) and Karunakaran (34)	18 November 2008	Channasip-Paranthan, Kilinochchi	3	2 seriously injured	Army	According to pro-rebel TamilNet
Killing of school girl Arulanandam Nirojini (6)	1 December 2008	Vaddakkachchi, Kilinochchi	1	1 injured	Army	According to pro-rebel TamilNet
Mulliyavalai massacre	8 December 2008	Mulliyavalai, Mullaitivu	3		Army	According to pro-rebel TamilNet
Vaddakkachchi massacre	13 December 2008	Vaddakkachchi, Kilinochchi	3		Army	According to pro-rebel TamilNet
Vaddakkachchi bombing	17 December 2008	Vaddakkachchi, Kilinochchi	2	13 wounded	Air Force	According to pro-rebel TamilNet
Vaddakkachchi shelling	20 December 2008	Vaddakkachchi, Kilinochchi	2		Army	According to pro-rebel TamilNet
Iyakkachchi and Vaddakkachchi bombings	27 December 2008	Iyakkachchi and Vaddakkachchi, Kilinochchi	1	10 severely injured, including an 18-year-old girl who lost both her legs	Air Force	According to pro-rebel TamilNet
Murasumoaddai bombing	31 December 2008	Murasumoaddai, Kilinochchi	5	16 wounded	Air Force	According to pro-rebel TamilNet
Bombing of Murasumoaddai	1 January 2009	Murasumoaddai, Kilinochchi	5	28 wounded	Air Force	According to pro-rebel TamilNet
Shelling of Murasumoaddai	2 January 2009	Murasumoaddai, Kilinochchi	1	10 wounded	Army	According to pro-rebel TamilNet
Mullaitivu petrol station and bus depot bombing	2 January 2009	Mullaitivu	4		Air Force	
Shelling and bombardment of Kilinochchi	1-7 January 2009	Kilinochchi	12	77 injured	Army	According to pro-rebel TamilNet
Thevipuram and Vaddakachchi shelling	8 January 2009	Thevipuram, Vaddakachchi, Mullaitivu	5		Army	
Tharmapuram Hospital shelling	8 January 2009	Tharmapuram, Mullaitivu	7		Army	
Shelling of Puthukkudiyiruppu	11 January 2009	Puthukkudiyiruppu, Mullaitivu	4		Army	According to pro-rebel TamilNet
Shelling and bombardment of Kaiveali, Koampaavil, and Visuvamadu	16 January 2009	Kaiveali, Koampaavil, and Visuvamadu, Mullaitivu	5	7 injured	Army	According to pro-rebel TamilNet
Visuvamadu shelling	17-20 January 2009	Visuamadu, Mullaitivu	17		Army	
Shelling and bombardment of Mullaitivu and Kilinochchi suburbs	18 January 2009	Mullaitivu, Kilinochchi	18+	42 injured	Army	According to pro-rebel TamilNet
Killing of Balraj Ram Prakash and Kumarasingham Vishnukumar	19 January 2009	Gambirigaswewa, Anuradhapura	2		Military	
No Fire Zone shelling and bombardment	19 January 2009	No Fire Zone, Mullaitivu	16		Army	According to pro-rebel TamilNet
Suthanthirapuram, Thevipuram, Udayarkattu and Vallipuram shelling	20 January 2009	Suthanthirapuram, Thevipuram, Udayarkattu, Vallipuram, Mullaitivu	18+		Army	
Vallipuram Hospital shelling	22 January 2009	Vallipuram, Mullaitivu	5		Army	
Moonkilaru, Thevipuram and Udayarkattu shelling	22 January 2009	Moonkilaru, Thevipuram, Udayarkattu, Mullaitivu	40		Army	
No Fire Zone shelling and bombardment	23 January 2009	No Fire Zone, Mullaitivu	5	83 wounded	Army	According to pro-rebel TamilNet
Suthanthirapuram shelling	24 January 2009	Suthanthirapuram Junction, Mullaitivu	11+		Army	
Udaiyaarkaddu shelling	24 January 2009	Udaiyaarkaddu, Mullaitivu	12	87 wounded	Army	According to pro-rebel TamilNet
No Fire Zone shelling and bombardment	25 January 2009	No Fire Zone, Mullaitivu	22	60+ wounded	Army	According to pro-rebel TamilNet
Suthanthirapuram and Udayarkattu shelling	26 January 2009	Suthanthirapuram, Udayarkattu, Mullaitivu	11		Army	
Puthukkudiyiruppu shelling	26-31 January 2009	Puthukkudiyiruppu, Mullaitivu	210		Army	
Udayaarkaddu Hospital shelling	26 January 2009	Udayaarkaddu, Mullaitivu	12		Army	
No Fire Zone shelling and bombardment	26-28 January 2009	No Fire Zone, Mullaitivu	346	1000+ wounded	Army	According to pro-rebel TamilNet
Suthanthirapuram bombardment	29 January 2009	Suthanthirapuram, Mullaitivu	44	178 wounded	Army	According to pro-rebel TamilNet
Moongkilaaru bombardment	31 January-1 February 2009	Moongkilaaru, Mullaitivu	43+		Air Force	According to pro-rebel TamilNet
Puthukkudiyiruppu Hospital shelling	1-3 February 2009	Puthukkudiyiruppu, Mullaitivu	9+		Army	
Suthanthirapuram shelling	3 February 2009	Suthanthirapuram, Mullaitivu	3-58		Army	
No Fire Zone shelling and bombardment	3-4 February 2009	No Fire Zone, Mullaitivu	150+	100+ wounded	Army	According to pro-rebel TamilNet
Ponnambalam Memorial Hospital bombing	5-6 February 2009	Near Puthukkudiyiruppu, Mullaitivu	75 (up to)		Army	
Mahtalan, Moongilaru, Suthanthirapuram, Thevipuram, Udayarkattu and Vallipuram shelling	6 February 2009	Mahtalan, Moongilaru, Suthanthirapuram, Thevipuram, Udayarkattu, Vallipuram, Mullaitivu	48		Army	
Puthukkudiyiruppu shelling	7 February 2009	Puthukkudiyiruppu, Mullaitivu	126		Army	
Putumattalan shelling	7 February 2009	Putumattalan, Mullaitivu	4		Army	
Suthanthirapuram shelling	7 February 2009	Suthanthirapuram, Mullaitivu	80		Army	
No Fire Zone shelling and bombardment	9 February 2009	No Fire Zone, Mullaitivu	36	76 injured	Army	According to pro-rebel TamilNet
Devipuram shelling	9 February 2009	Devipuram, Mullaitivu	7		Army	
Pokkanai bombing	9 February 2009	Pokkanai, Mullaitivu	3		Air Force	
Mattalan shelling	9 February 2009	Mattalan, Mullaitivu	16		Army	
Putumattalan Hospital shelling	9 February-20 April 2009	Putumattalan, Mullaitivu	51+		Army	
Indiscriminate shelling in Mullaitivu	10-12 February 2009	Mullaitivu	240+		Army	According to pro-rebel TamilNet
Mattalan, Thevipuram and Vallipuram shelling	11-12 February 2009	Mattalan, Thevipuram, Vallipuram, Mullaitivu	69		Army	
Iranaipalai shelling	13 February 2009	Iranaipalai, Mullaitivu	9		Army	
Puthukkudiyiruppu Hospital shelling	13 February 2009	Puthukkudiyiruppu, Mullaitivu	14		Army	
Thevipuram and Vallipuram shelling	14 February 2009	Thevipuram, Vallipuram, Mullaitivu	36		Army	
No Fire Zone shelling and bombardment	14-16 February 2009	No Fire Zone, Mullaitivu	275		Army	According to pro-rebel TamilNet
Mullivaikkal and Putumattalan bombing and shelling	15 February 2009	Mullivaikkal, Putumattalan, Mullaitivu	19		Army, Air Force	
Valayanmadam shelling	15 February 2009	Valayanmadam, Mullaitivu	62		Army	
Mattalan shelling	16 February 2009	Valayanmadam, Mullaitivu	65		Army	
Valayanmadam shelling	17 February 2009	Valayanmadam, Mullaitivu	48		Army	
Ampalavanpokkanai, Idaikdu and Puthukkudiyiruppu shelling	18 February 2009	Ampalavanpokkanai, Idaikdu, Puthukkudiyiruppu, Mullaitivu	128		Army	
Valayanmadam bombing	19 February 2009	Valayanmadam, Mullaitivu	100+		Air Force	
Ananthapuram, Iranaipalai, Mullivaikkal and Puthukkudiyiruppu shelling	19 February 2009	Ananthapuram, Iranaipalai, Mullivaikkal, Puthukkudiyiruppu, Mullaitivu	17		Army	
Valayanmadam shelling	20 February 2009	Valayanmadam, Mullaitivu	12		Army	
Ananthapuram, Iranaipalai, Pokkanai, Puthukkudiyiruppu and Valayanmadam shelling	20 February 2009	Ananthapuram, Iranaipalai, Pokkanai, Puthukkudiyiruppu, Valayanmadam, Mullaitivu	92		Army	
Ampalavanpokkanai, Mattalan, Mullivaikkal, Pokkanai and Valayanmadam shelling	21 February 2009	Ampalavanpokkanai, Mattalan, Mullivaikkal, Pokkanai, Valayanmadam, Mullaitivu	69		Army	
Ananthapuram and Iranaipalai shelling	21 February 2009	Ananthapuram, Iranaipalai, Mullaitivu	13		Army	
No Fire Zone shelling	21-22 February 2009	No Fire Zone, Mullaitivu	50	130 wounded	Army	According to pro-rebel TamilNet
Iranaipalai shelling	23 February 2009	Iranaipalai, Mullaitivu	3		Army	
Puthukkudiyiruppu bombing and shelling	25-26 February 2009	Puthukkudiyiruppu, Mullaitivu	45		Army, Air Force	
Mullaitivu shelling	28 February-2 March 2009	Mullaitivu	122		Army	According to pro-rebel TamilNet
Mattalan hospital bombing	3 March 2009	Mattalan, Mullaitivu	13		Army	According to pro-rebel TamilNet
No Fire Zone shelling	4 March 2009	No Fire Zone, Mullaitivu	78	182 injured	Army	According to pro-rebel TamilNet
Ampalavakanai and Mullivaikkal shelling	4 March 2009	Ampalavakanai, Mullivaikkal, Mullaitivu	58		Army	
Abduction and disappearance of 17-year-old Jeromy Kasipillai	4 March 2009	Mullaitivu	1		Army	
Mattalan and Valayanmadam shelling	5 March 2009	Mattalan, Valayanmadam, Mullaitivu	57		Army	
Mattalan and Valayanmadam shelling	7 March 2009	Mattalan, Valayanmadam, Mullaitivu	51-52		Army	
No Fire Zone shelling	9 March 2009	No Fire Zone, Mullaitivu	21-52		Army	
No Fire Zone shelling	10 March 2009	No Fire Zone, Mullaitivu	133	273 wounded	Army	According to pro-rebel TamilNet
No Fire Zone shelling	11 March 2009	No Fire Zone, Mullaitivu	72		Army	
No Fire Zone shelling	12 March 2009	No Fire Zone, Mullaitivu	32-38		Army	
No Fire Zone shelling	12 March 2009	No Fire Zone, Mullaitivu	82	130+ wounded	Army	According to pro-rebel TamilNet
Pokkanai shelling	12 March 2009	Pokkanai, Mullaitivu	5		Army	
Mattalan, Mullivaikkal and Pokkanai shelling	13 March 2009	Mattalan, Mullivaikkal, Pokkanai, Mullaitivu	52		Army	
Mattalan shelling	13 March 2009	Mattalan, Mullaitivu	8		Army	
No Fire Zone shelling and bombardment	14 March 2009	No Fire Zone, Mullaitivu	69	Scores injured	Army, Air Force	According to pro-rebel TamilNet
No Fire Zone shelling and bombardment	15-17 March 2009	No Fire Zone, Mullaitivu	137	200+ injured	Army, Air Force	According to pro-rebel TamilNet
Valayanmadam bombing	17 March 2009	Valayanmadam, Mullaitivu	26		Air Force	
No Fire Zone shelling	18-20 March 2009	No Fire Zone, Mullaitivu	102		Army	According to pro-rebel TamilNet
Valayanmadam shelling	20 March 2009	Valayanmadam, Mullaitivu	5		Army	
No Fire Zone shelling and bombardment	21 March 2009	No Fire Zone, Mullaitivu	42	80	Army, Air Force	According to pro-rebel TamilNet
No Fire Zone bombardment	22-23 March 2009	No Fire Zone, Mullaitivu	128	160 injured	Army	According to pro-rebel TamilNet
Mullivaikkal, Putumattalan and Valayanmadam shelling	23 March 2009	Mullivaikkal, Putumattalan, Valayanmadam, Mullaitivu	100+		Army	
No Fire Zone shelling and bombardment	24 March 2009	No Fire Zone, Mullaitivu	62		Army	According to pro-rebel TamilNet
No Fire Zone shelling and bombardment	25 March 2009	No Fire Zone, Mullaitivu	131	185 wounded	Army, Air Force	According to pro-rebel TamilNet
Puthumattalan hospital bombing	26 March 2009	Puthumattalan, Mullaitivu	5	11 injured	Army	According to pro-rebel TamilNet
No Fire Zone shelling and bombardment	26-28 March 2009	No Fire Zone, Mullaitivu	179	109 children injured	Army	According to pro-rebel TamilNet
No Fire Zone shelling	27 March 2009	No Fire Zone, Mullaitivu	61		Army	
No Fire Zone shelling	28 March 2009	No Fire Zone, Mullaitivu	51		Army	
No Fire Zone shelling and bombardment	29 March 2009	No Fire Zone, Mullaitivu	53	119 injured	Army	According to pro-rebel TamilNet
Indiscriminate attacks at Mullaitivu	30 March 2009	Mullaitivu	88	156 wounded	Army	According to pro-rebel TamilNet
Cluster bombing of No Fire Zone	31 March 2009	Mullaitivu	45	120 wounded	Army	According to pro-rebel TamilNet
Killing of 12 pregnant mothers	March 2009	Mullaitivu	12		Army	According to pro-rebel TamilNet
Indiscriminate attacks on No Fire Zone	1-3 April 2009	Mullaitivu	90	195 wounded	Army	According to pro-rebel TamilNet
Indiscriminate attacks on No Fire Zone	5 April 2009	Mathalan, Pokkanai, Valaignarmadam, Iraddaivaikkal, Mullaitivu	71	143 wounded	Army	According to pro-rebel TamilNet
Pokkanai shelling	7 April 2009	Pokkanai, Mullaitivu	20		Army	
Primary Health clinic shelling	8 April 2009	Pokkanai, Mullaitivu	50		Army	
No Fire Zone shelling	8 April 2009	No Fire Zone, Mullaitivu	60		Army	
Shelling of Pokkanai	8 April 2009	Pokkanai, Mullaitivu	31		Army	
Indiscriminate attacks at Pokkanai and Valaignarmadam	13 April 2009	Pokkanai and Valaignarmadam, Mullaitivu	47	300 injured	Army	According to pro-rebel TamilNet
No Fire Zone Shelling	12 April 2009	No Fire Zone, Mullaitivu	31	36 injured	Army	According to pro-rebel TamilNet
Indiscriminate attacks at Valaignarmadam and Mullivaikkal	13 April 2009	Valaignarmadam and Mullivaikkal, Mullaitivu	23		Army	According to pro-rebel TamilNet
Indiscriminate attacks on civilian zone in Mullivaikkal and Pokkanai	15 April 2009	Mullivaikkal and Pokkanai, Mullaitivu	180		Army	According to pro-rebel TamilNet
Shelling of No Fire Zone	16 April 2009	Iraddaivaikkal, Mullivaikkal and Pokkanai, Mullaitivu	57	300 injured	Army	According to pro-rebel TamilNet
Pokkanai shelling	19 April 2009	Pokkanai, Mullaitivu	4-5		Army	
Shelling of Iraddaivaikkal and Mullivaikkal	19 April 2009	Iraddaivaikkal and Mullivaikkal, Mullaitivu	60		Army	According to pro-rebel TamilNet
Shelling of Mathalan and Pokkanai	20 April 2009	Mathalan and Pokkanai, Mullaitivu	300	600 seriously wounded	Army	According to pro-rebel TamilNet
Valayanmadam makeshift hospital bombing	21 April 2009	Valayanmadam, Mullaitivu	4-5		Air Force	
Mass killing of civilians at Puthumathalan	April 2009	Puthumathalan, Mullaitivu	1,500+		Army	
Valayanmadam shelling	23 April 2009	Valayanmadam, Mullaitivu	10		Army	
Mullivaikkal Hospital bombings	23 April-12 May 2009	Mullivaikkal, Mullaitivu	100+		Army, Air Force	
Iraddayvaikkal and Mullivaikkal bombing	28 April 2009	Iraddayvaikkal, Mullivaikkal, Mullaitivu	29		Air Force, Navy	
Mullivaikkal makeshift hospital bombing	29 April 2009	Mullivaikkal, Mullaitivu	9	15 injured	Army	According to pro-rebel TamilNet
Indiscriminate attacks at Mullivaikkal	29 April 2009	Mullivaikkal, Mullaitivu	300		Army	According to pro-rebel TamilNet
Indiscriminate shelling at Mullivaikkal	1 May 2009	Mullivaikkal, Mullaitivu	27+	110+ injured	Army	According to pro-rebel TamilNet
Mullivaikkal makeshift hospital bombing	2 May 2009	Mullivaikkal, Mullaitivu	68	87 injured	Army	
Valayanmadam makeshift hospital bombing	8 May 2009	Valayanmadam, Mullaitivu	4-5		Army	
Indiscriminate shelling at Mullivaikkal	8 May 2009	Mullivaikkal, Mullaitivu	45+	242+ injured	Army	According to pro-rebel TamilNet
Bombing of 'safe zone' at Mullivaikkal	9 May 2009	Mullivaikkal, Mullaitivu		At least 50 injured	Army	According to pro-rebel TamilNet
Indiscriminate attacks at Mullivaikkal	10-12 May 2009	Mullivaikkal, Mullaitivu	2,600+		Army	According to pro-rebel TamilNet
Mullivaikkal makeshift hospital bombing	12 May 2009	Mullivaikkal, Mullaitivu	47	55 seriously injured	Army	
Mullivaikkal makeshift hospital bombing	13 May 2009	Mullivaikkal, Mullaitivu	100+		Army	According to pro-rebel TamilNet
Massacre of civilians at Mullivaikkal	15 May 2009	Mullivaikkal, Mullaitivu	Hundreds killed	Hundreds maimed	Army	According to pro-rebel TamilNet
Killing of Vijayabalan (37)	15 May 2009	Mullaitivu	1	2 injured	Army	According to pro-rebel TamilNet
Indiscriminate attacks at Mullivaikkal	16 May 2009	Mullivaikkal, Mullaitivu	100+	2000-3000 dead bodies lying around civilian congested area	Army	According to pro-rebel TamilNet
17–19 May 2009 disappearances of Tamils in Army custody	17-19 May 2009	Mullaitivu	500		Army	
Massacre of civilians at Mullivaikkal	18 May 2009	Mullivaikkal, Mullaitivu	Spree of massacres		Army	
Killing of Balachandran Prabhakaran	19 May 2009	Mullaitivu	1		Army	
Gun Site killings of Tamil-speaking youths	late May 2009	Trincomalee Naval Base	11		Navy	
Grease devil crisis	August 2011	Eastern Province, Northern Province, Puttalam District	3	Hundreds beaten and injured	Military, Police	
Murder of Balawarnan Sivakumar	29 October 2009	Bambalapitiya	1		Police	
Welikada prison riot	9-10 November 2012	Welikada Prison	27		Police (STF), Army	
Weliweriya Protestors' Attack	1 August 2013	Weliweirya	3		Army	
Killing of V. Sulakshan and N. Gajan	20 October 2016	Kokkuvil, Jaffna	2		Police	
Killing of Thiraviyam Ramalingam (24)	20 June 2020	Muhamalai, Kilinochchi	1		Army	
Mahara prison riot	29 November 2020	Mahara	11	117 severely injured	Police	
Killing of Chandran Vithushan (21)	3 June 2021	Iruthayapuram, Batticaloa	1		CID, Police	
2022 Rambukkana killing	18 April 2022	Rambukkana	1		Police	
Killing of R. Rajakumari (42)	12 May 2023	Welikada Police Station, Colombo	1		Police	
Killing of Nagarasa Alex (25)	19 November 2023	Sithankerny, Jaffna	1		Police	
Killing of Anandadeepan Darsanth (13)	29 November 2023	Kalmunai probation centre, Ampara	1		Department of Probation and Child Care Services	
Killing of Ethirmanasingham Kapilraj (32)	7 August 2025	Muththaiyankaddu, Mullaitivu	1	4 injured	Army	
Killing of Sivanesarasa Rinoshan (23)	7 December 2025	Batticaloa	1		Police	
Killing of Albino Arul Pius (17)	10 February 2026	Allaipiddy, Jaffna	1		Police	
