= 1999 Puthukkudiyiruppu bombing =

Aerial bombardment in Sri Lanka

Puthkkudiyiruppu bombing
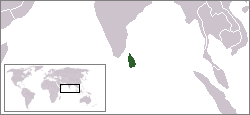
- Location of Sri Lanka
- Location: Puthukkudiyiruppu, Northern Province, Sri Lanka
- Date: September 15, 1999; 10 a.m (+8 GMT)
- Target: Sri Lankan Tamil Civilians
- Attack type: Aerial bombardment
- Weapon: KFir Jets
- Deaths: 21
- Injuries: At least 40+
- Perpetrator: Sri Lanka Air Force

The Puthukkudiyiruppu bombing was an aerial attack carried out against Sri Lankan Tamil civilians by the Sri Lankan Air Force on September 15 in the year 1999 killing over 21 including schoolchildren and women as well as inflicting serious injuries upon many more.

== Incidents ==
On September 15, 1999, two Kfir Jets belonging to the Sri Lanka Air Force bombed a crowded public place in the Tamil town of Puthukkudiyiruppu in the Mullaitivu District which was under the control of the Tamil Tigers.

The Puthukkudiyiruppu market and many houses and buildings nearby were destroyed in the SLAF bombing, as per NGO sources Human flesh is strewn all over the market area sources in the Vanni had said.

Tamil Eelam Vaanoli, an official radio program of the LTTE, put the casualty figure at 22, and injuries over 40.

== Reactions ==
=== Red Cross ===
The International Committee of the Red Cross (ICRC) condemned the bombing and said that sixteen civilians were killed on the spot and six who were seriously wounded in the bombing died in their way to hospital.

=== Amnesty International ===
The bombing raised serious criticisms from the Amnesty International which in a statement expressing concern over the bombing, said a Sri Lankan military spokesperson had denied the raid, which killed at least 21 refugees in a crowded market place, had been a deliberate attack on civilians.

The organization also questioned the Sri Lankan military's adherence to the fundamental rules of the Humanitarian law which include the prohibition of direct attacks on civilians and civilian objects and the prohibition of attacks on military targets expected to cause incidental loss of civilian life.

=== Sri Lankan Government ===
The charges were denied by the Sri Lankan government spokesperson who claimed that two bombing raids were conducted in the area and one of them was aimed at a nearby LTTE base. But this was rejected by other sources, who claimed that the LTTE camp was located near the Nandikadal Lagoon situated 4 and a half kilometers away from the town.

A Tamil politician from Colombo said that the SLAF attack on the civilian target appeared to be in retaliation to the heavy losses suffered last Sunday by the Sri Lanka army north of Mannar.

He pointed out that civilian targets have been bombed by the SLAF in past following major set backs in the war against the Liberation Tigers.

According to independent sources, 138 Sri Lanka army personnel, including two officers, were killed and 902 were wounded when the Liberation Tigers counterattacked a major offensive by government forces.

== Retaliation ==
In retaliation, LTTE cadres hacked to death 48 Sinhalese villagers and shot six others in attacks on three villages in eastern Sri Lanka.

== See also ==
- Chencholai bombing
- Nagerkovil school bombing
- Vaharai Bombing
- List of attacks on civilians attributed to Sri Lankan government forces
