= Vanni Van bombing =

2008 bombing in Sri Lanka

- Location: Kilinochchi, Vanni, Sri Lanka
- Date: May 23, 2008; 14:15 (UTC+5:30)
- Attack type: Remote bombing
- Weapon: Claymore Mine
- Deaths: 16
- Injuries: 19
- Perpetrator: Sri Lankan Army

The Vanni Van bombing, also referred to as the Murukandy claymore attack, was the bombing of a private van on May 23, 2008 which killed sixteen civilians, including five children. A local Human rights organization, NESOHR alleged that the attack was carried out by the Deep Penetration Unit of the Sri Lankan army.

== Background ==
There had been series of attacks on LTTE commanders and Tamil civilians living in the rebel controlled Vanni region allegedly by the Deep Penetration Unit of the Sri Lankan army

== Incident ==
The incident took place when a private van was hit by a claymore mine when it was returning from the Akkaraayan hospital to Kilinochchi on Murikandy -Akkaraayan Road on the May 23, 2008 at 2.15 in the afternoon. The pro-rebel NESOHR claimed that the attack was carried out by the Deep Penetration Unit of the Sri Lankan army. Tamilnet, a pro-rebel news website, claimed that earlier in the same day an ambulance was targeted in a similar fashion. It further claimed that the Deep Penetration Unit of the Sri Lankan army was responsible for both attacks.

== See also ==
- Shrine of Our Lady of Madhu
- Madhu church bombing
- 2008 Sri Lanka bus bombings
- 2008 Fort Railway Station Bombing
