= Massacre at Thandikulam =

Disputed event of the Sri Lankan Civil War

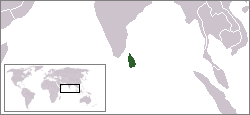
Location of Sri Lanka

The Massacre at Thandikulam is a disputed event which occurred during Sri Lankan Civil War. It took place on 19 November 2006 when suspected LTTE carders exploded an improvised explosive device (IED) targeting a military truck, killing five Sri Lanka Army soldiers. Five students of the Thandikulam Agriculture Farm School were also killed in either the explosion or the subsequent gunfight. As of June 2007, investigations are ongoing to ascertain the cause of their deaths.

== Incident ==
The incident happened when a bomb exploded targeting a Sri Lanka Army truck transporting military personnel, and it was followed by a gunfight at Thandikulam, Vauniya on 19 November 2006. The bomb exploded 10 meters away from Thandikulam Agriculture Farm School, which is managed by the Sri Lankan Government, at around 9:45 am. Sri Lanka Police and Security forces alleged that this Claymore type directional mine was placed by the LTTE, which is a rebel group banned as a terrorist organisation by 32 countries including the United States, India and the member states of the European Union. But LTTE denied responsibility.

== Casualties ==
Five Sri Lanka Army soldiers including an officer were killed in the incident along with five students, including four Sri Lankan Tamils, and one Sri Lankan Moor. Ten more students and four soldiers in the truck were wounded in the attack.

== Allegations towards responsibility ==
Initially the Pro rebel LTTE media placed the blame on the government saying the army had entered the Thandikulam Agriculture Farm School, lined up the uniformed hostel students and shot at them blank range after the explosion and later it was followed by the international media agencies and by the Sri Lanka Monitoring Mission. But military sources denied these allegations and said, following a claymore attack on an army truck killing five soldiers, the LTTE opened fire on the troops using the farm school as a shield. The dead students were caught in the crossfire.

== Investigation ==
After the regional magistrate completed the initial investigation, he handed over the evidence and further investigation to the CID. The CID teams investigating the massacre of five students have arrested a police constable and a soldier as inquiries revealed the complicity of the police constable attached to the Kurumankadu Sri Lanka Police post and the soldier in a nearby bunker.

According to the CID, 13 empty Type 56 cartridges have been found at the scene initially by Police and five more empty casings and two live ammunition of the same caliber were found at the scene by CID teams on 21 November. One slug has been recovered from one body, by the District Medical Officer. Evidence has revealed that soon after the explosion targeting the Army truck, a group of personnel in camouflage uniforms had opened fire at the Agriculture School students. Further investigations are still going on.

== Notes ==
- Place: Located five kilometers north of the Vavuniya town, a place where once a fierce battlefield.
- Casualty: Ramachandran Atchuthan of Batticaloa, Chethravel Gopinath of Trincomalee, Rizwan Mohamed of Batticaloa, Thirunavuharasu Sinthujan of Vavuniya and Sangaralingam Hindujan of Batticaloa killed.
- CID: Criminal Investigation Department, an independent unit of Sri Lanka Police which is directly responsible for the Sri Lankas' high court juridical system.

== See also ==
- List of attacks on civilians attributed to Sri Lankan government forces
