= Akkaraipattu massacre =

1986 killing of Tamil farmers by the Sri Lankan Army in Eastern Province, Sri Lanka

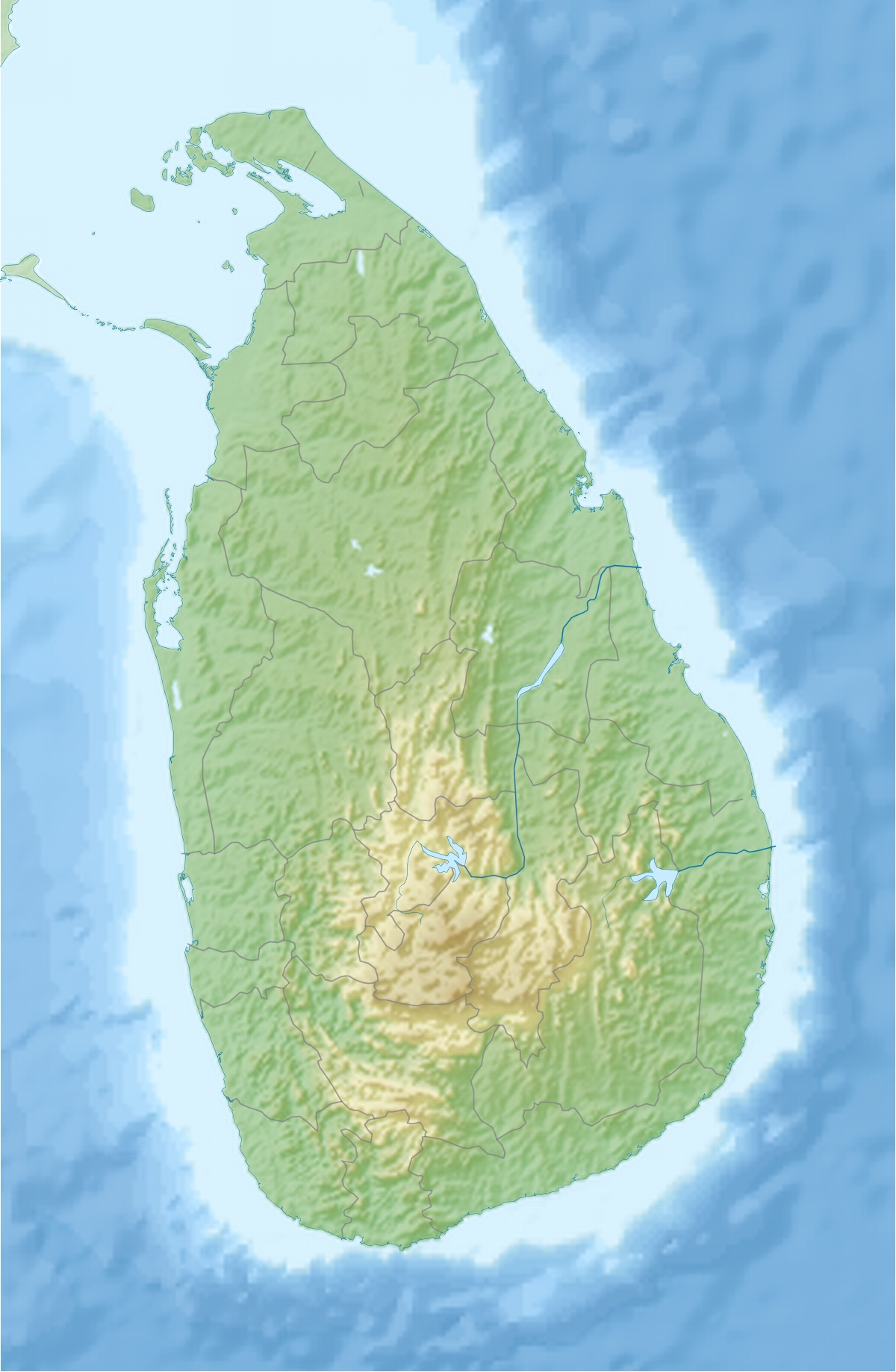
- Location: 7°13′N 81°51′E; Akkaraipattu, Sri Lanka
- Date: February 19, 1986 (+6 GMT)
- Target: Sri Lankan Tamil civilians
- Attack type: Firing
- Weapon: Guns
- Deaths: 80
- Perpetrators: Sri Lankan Army, Muslim Home Guards

Akkaraipattu massacre happened on 19 February 1986 when approximately 80 Tamil farm workers were killed by the Sri Lankan Army personnel with the assistance of Muslim Home Guards and their bodies burned in the Eastern Province of Sri Lanka. The incident came to light a few days later when community leaders visited the remote location in the village of Udumbankulam near the town of Akkaraipattu, where the farm workers were shot.

== Details ==
According to community leaders, the farm workers were threshing the paddy fields when troops appeared from the nearby jungle firing into the air. The women were freed, but the soldiers rounded up the men, tied their hands and made them sit on the road. The farm workers were taken back to the paddy fields and shot. Several empty cases of ammunition have been found in the field. Later the bodies were piled on top of a harvested, dry rice crop and burned. In the aftermath of the assault, five Tamil women came forward with reports that they had been raped in the paddy fields during the assault.

== International Reporting ==
The event was documented by BBC foreign correspondent and journalist, Humphrey Hawksley in The Guardian on February 22, 1986. He was subsequently, expelled from Sri Lanka after six months for documenting human rights abuses against civilians in his coverage of the conflict. The incident has been cited as an example of ethnic cleansing and systematic violence against the Tamil population in Sri Lanka's Eastern Province during that period.

== See also ==
- List of attacks on civilians attributed to Sri Lankan government forces
