= Madhu school bus bombing =

Bombing in Mannar, Sri Lanka

- Mannar District within Sri Lanka
- Location: Madhu, Mannar, Sri Lanka
- Date: January 29, 2008; 14:30 (UTC+5:30)
- Attack type: Remote bombing
- Weapon: Claymore Mine
- Deaths: 17 ( 6 Adults and 11 School Children)
- Injuries: 14
- Perpetrator: Sri Lankan Army’s deep penetration unit

The Madhu School bus bombing, also known as Thadchanamadhu claymore attack, was the bombing of a school bus carried out on January 29, 2008, in rebel LTTE controlled area in Thadchanamadhu in Mannar, Northern province of Sri Lanka. The bombing killed 17 Tamils, including 11 school children, and injured at least 14 more people. The LTTE and NESHOR accused the Sri Lankan Army’s deep penetration unit for the attack but the Army denied the allegations. This attack was the second attack on a civilian bus in the month of January in Sri Lanka.

== Background ==
On January 2, 2008, the government of Sri Lanka officially pulled out of the cease fire signed in 2002.The area lies near the border between Sri Lankan Army and rebel LTTE controlled areas and around 22 claymore attacks had taken place earlier killing 62 people.Students were returning from Mannar Sinapandivirichchan Government Tamil Mixed School travel through this route daily.

== Incident ==
On 29 January 2008 a bus carrying civilians was hit by a claymore mine that resulted in the death of 17 civilians including 11 school children and injuring 14 more people. This incident took place in the town of Mannar about 1 km from the Madhu Church which is a LTTE rebel controlled area. The pro-rebel Tamilnet reported that the civilian bus was hit by a claymore that was triggered by Sri Lankan Army’s deep penetration unit. It further claimed that the victims were students and teachers returning from a sporting event. The Sri Lankan Army denied any responsibility and claimed that there was no military unit operating in the area at that time.

== See also ==
- Shrine of Our Lady of Madhu
- Madhu church bombing
