= 1984 Point Pedro massacre =

Massacre in Sri Lanka

Point Pedro massacre
- Location of Northern Province, Sri Lanka
- Location: Point Pedro, Jaffna District, Northern Province, Sri Lanka
- Date: September 2, 1984
- Target: Sri Lankan Tamil Civilians
- Attack type: shooting, arson
- Weapon: guns
- Deaths: 18
- Injuries: many
- Perpetrator: Sri Lankan Police

1984 Point Pedro massacre refers to the massacre of ethnic Sri Lankan Tamil civilians by the Sri Lankan Police in Point Pedro, a town in Northern Province, Sri Lanka. Police violence resulted in the deaths of at least 18 Tamils and also a high damage to the local property. The Hartley College library was burned down along with its laboratory reminiscent of the Burning of Jaffna library.

== Background ==
Following the deadly violence against Tamils during the Black July pogrom, that resulted in 3000 deaths of Tamil civilians and widespread migration of tens of thousands out of the country, the Sri Lankan government began to engage in a full-scale war against several of Tamil militant groups who had taken up arms to liberate or acquire greater autonomy in the country's north and east, considered the traditional homeland of the island's Tamil populace. Civilians in the north and east were often subjects to torture, forced disappearances and even extrajudicial killings by the Sri Lankan military and other agencies.

== The incident ==
On 16 September 1984, four Sri Lankan policemen were killed in combat near Thikkam. The Police responded by shooting between 16 and 18 civilians dead in Point Pedro. Police also burned shops and several Hartley College buildings in retaliation for the attack.

== Aftermath ==
=== Government response ===
The National Security Minister stated that 6 to 10 civilians were killed, and a few shops were burned according to government information. The Sri Lankan Government ordered a police investigation and promised that disciplinary action would be taken against those responsible. The Minister, however observed that it was difficult to gather evidence sufficient to support court-martial sanctions. No one was subsequently prosecuted.

=== Violence against schools in Tamil areas ===
Following the massacre and the burning down of the Hartley College buildings, schools and educational institutions in Jaffna District functioned in a climate of fear. Schools in Point Pedro stopped functioning for a long period of time. Several other educational institutions in the region became active and deliberate targets for the Sri Lankan military.

== See also ==
- List of attacks on civilians attributed to Sri Lankan government forces
