= 1985 Kantalai massacre =

Mass murder in Sri Lanka

Kantalai massacre
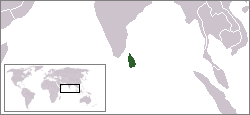
- Location of Sri Lanka
- Location: Kantalai, Eastern Province, Sri Lanka
- Date: 9 November 1985 (+8 GMT)
- Target: Primarily Sri Lankan Tamil Civilians
- Deaths: 6
- Injuries: Unknown
- Perpetrator: Sri Lankan Army

The 1985 Kantalai massacre refers to the torture and subsequent murder of 6 Sri Lankan Tamils by the Sri Lankan military.

== Murder of family ==
On 9 November 1985, soldiers belonging to the Sri Lankan military went to the home of Mayilvakanam near a Hindu temple, Kantalai Pillayar Kovil. The military then abducted all 6 members of the house. Later their bodies were found in 4th Mile post area in Allai road. Among the bodies, were two daughters of Mayilvakanam. Postmortem revealed that the two girls were raped before being killed.

== See also ==
- List of attacks on civilians attributed to Sri Lankan government forces

== Sources ==
- THE NORTHEAST SECRETARIAT ON HUMAN RIGHTS (NESOHR). Massacres of Tamils (1956–2008) p. 14–15. Chennai: Manitham Publishers, 2009. ISBN 978-81-909737-0-0
- Barnett R. Rubin. Cycles of Violence: Human Rights in Sri Lanka Since the Indo-Sri Lanka Agreement p. 33.
