= 1985 Muttur massacre =

Mass killing in Sri Lanka

Muttur massacre
- Muttur (Sri Lanka)
- Location: Muttur, Eastern Province, Sri Lanka
- Date: 8–10 November 1985 (+8 GMT)
- Target: Sri Lankan Tamil civilians
- Deaths: At least 30 (Possibly 100+)
- Injuries: Unknown
- Perpetrators: Sri Lankan Army, Sri Lankan Navy, Sri Lankan Air Force

1985 Muttur massacre was a mass killing of Tamil civilians in the town of Muttur in Eastern Province, Sri Lanka. The massacre occurred when all three divisions of the Sri Lankan military attacked the town by land, air and sea. The motive of the attacks was deliberately aimed at slaughtering ethnic Tamils, who formed the local population in the region. The killings lasted from 8 to 10 November of 1985.

== Casualties ==
Civilians were shot, killed and burnt with their houses. Over 30 people were confirmed to have been killed. And over 70 others who have been arrested or have been forcibly disappeared were not accounted for. Several others who attempted to escape and those who sought refuge at temples were also killed.

== See also ==
- 2006 Trincomalee massacre of NGO workers
- List of attacks on civilians attributed to Sri Lankan government forces
