= Kathiraveli =

Kathiraveli கதிரவெளி කතිරවෙළිය
- Town
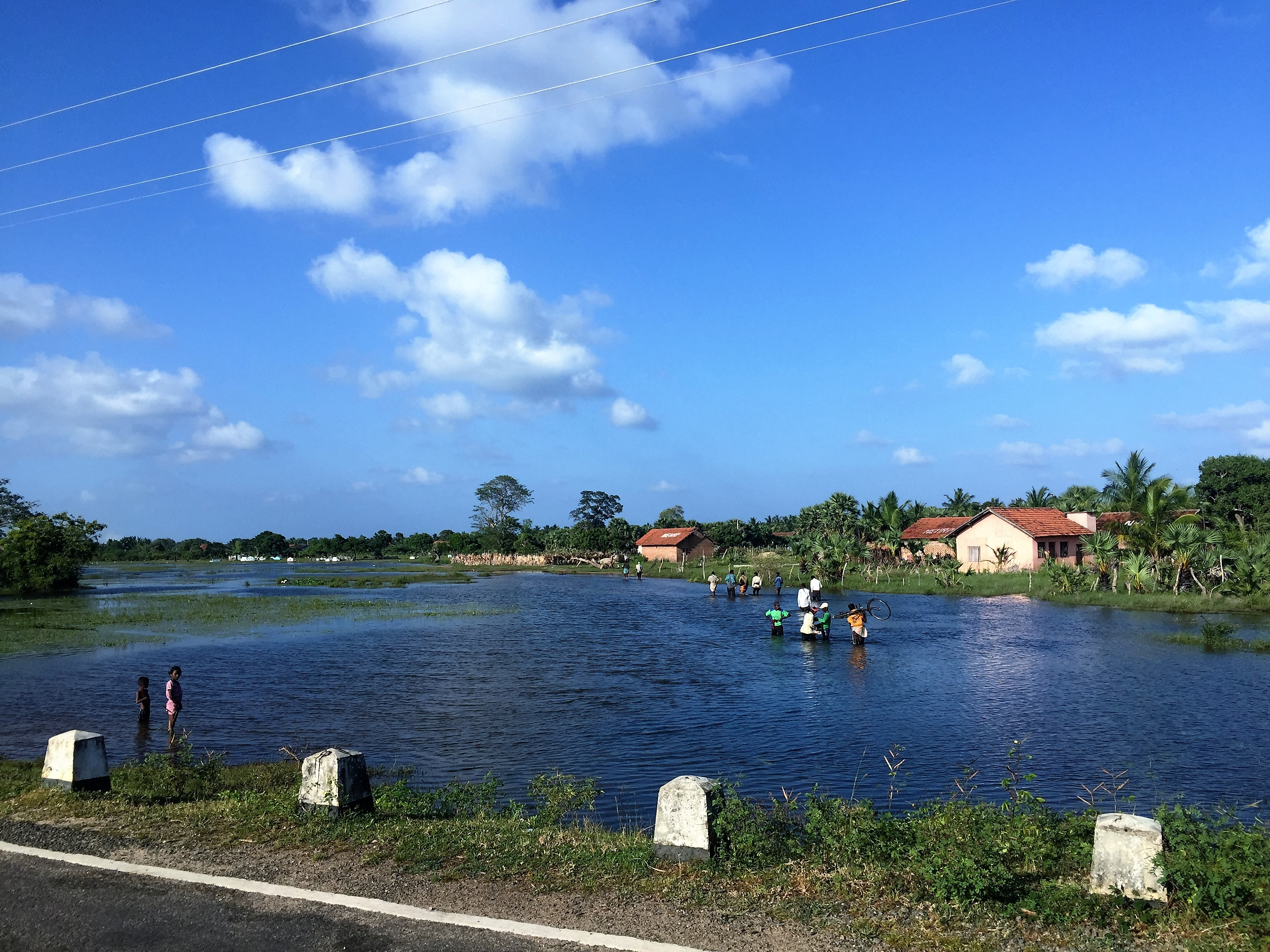

- Location within Sri Lanka
- Coordinates: 8°13′0″N 81°24′0″E
- Country: Sri Lanka
- Province: Eastern
- District: Batticaloa
- DS Division: Koralai Pattu North

Population (2007)
  - Total: 2,287
- Time zone: SLST(UTC+05:30)

Kathiraveli or கதிரவெளி (Paddy Field in Tamil) is a town in Batticaloa District, Sri Lanka. It is located about 75 km Northwest of Batticaloa.

== See also ==
- Vakarai Bombing
