= Kodikamam =

- Town
- Location within Northern Province
- Coordinates: 9°39′0″N 80°09′0″E
- Country: Sri Lanka
- Province: Northern
- District: Jaffna
- DS Division: Thenmarachchi
- Time zone: UTC+5:30 (Sri Lanka Standard Time Zone)

Kodikamam is a small town in the Jaffna Peninsula of Jaffna District, Northern Province, Sri Lanka.

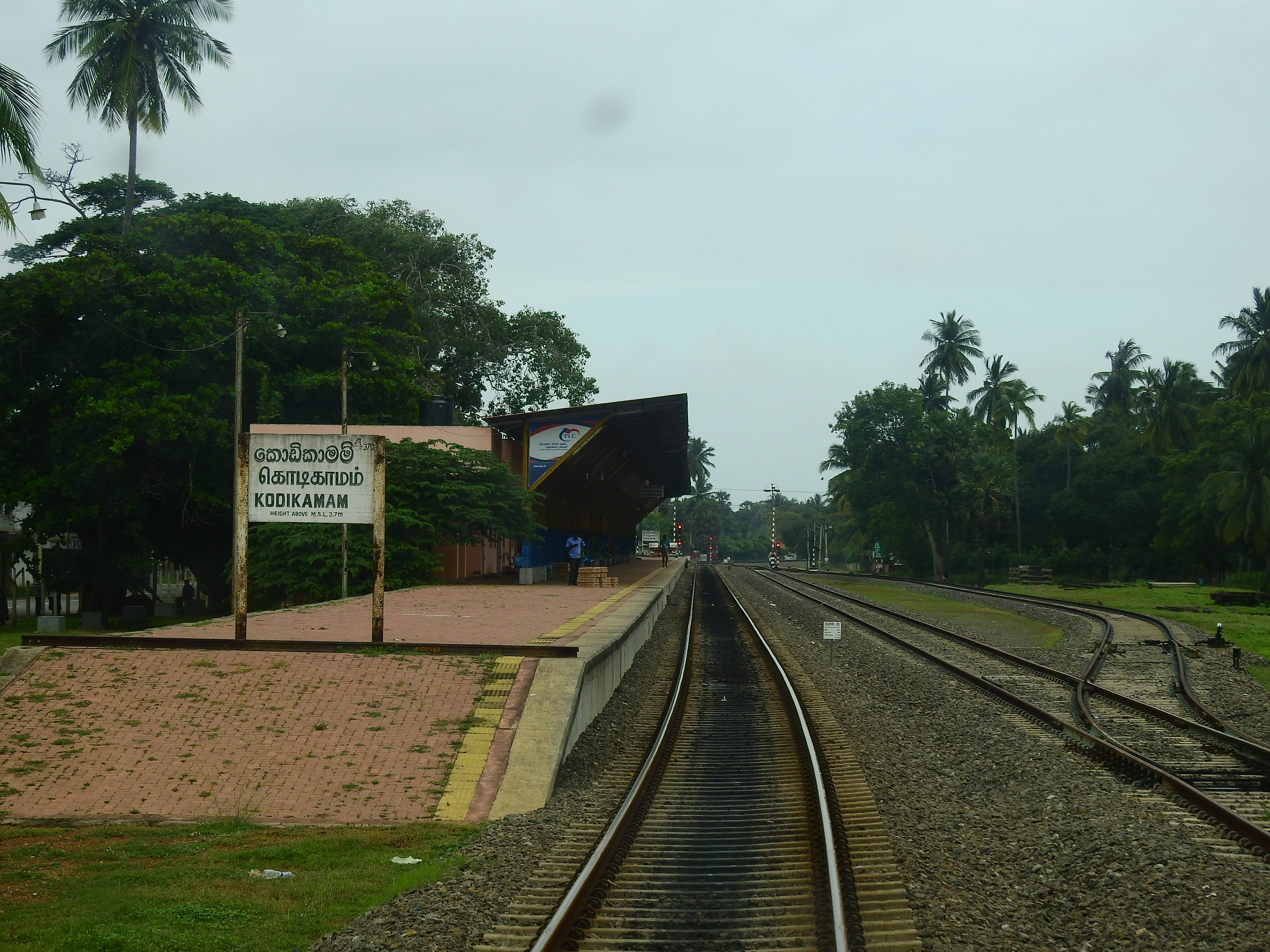
Kodikamam Railway Station.
