= Kantharmadam =

Coordinates: 9°40′34.0″N 80°1′16.3″E

Kantharmadam (also romanized Kandarmadam; Tamil: கந்தர்மடம்) is a village in the Northern Province of Sri Lanka. It is located 1 km north of Jaffna Town and 1 km away from a historical Hindu temple named நல்லூர் கந்தசாமி கோவில். Jaffna Hindu Ladies College is located in Kantharmadam, as are Jaffna University and Jaffna Hindu College.
