= Madhu church shelling =

Church massacre of the Sri Lankan Civil War

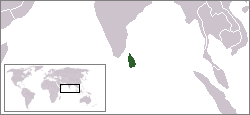
- Location of Sri Lanka
- Location: Madhu, Sri Lanka
- Date: November 20, 1999 (UTC+05:30)
- Target: Sri Lankan Tamil civilians
- Attack type: Shelling
- Weapon: Tank or Mortar shells
- Deaths: 40
- Injuries: 60

Madhu church shelling or Madhu church massacre is the name for the shelling of the Shrine of Our Lady of Madhu in Sri Lanka during the Sri Lankan civil war on November 20, 1999. The shelling resulted in the deaths of approximately 40 minority Sri Lankan Tamil civilians, including children, and more than 60 non-fatal injuries. The exact cause and nature of the event is disputed between the rebel Liberation Tigers of Tamil Eelam and the Sri Lankan government. According to Bishop Rayappu Joseph, the attack was carried out by the LTTE. The church is a Roman Catholic Marian shrine in Mannar district of Sri Lanka. With a history of over 400 years, this shrine acts as a center for pilgrimage and worship for Sri Lankan Catholics and others. The site is considered as the holiest Catholic shrine in the island.

== Background information ==
During the British colonial period, when Sri Lanka was known as Ceylon, most civil service jobs were (roughly 60%) held by minority Sri Lankan Tamils who were approximately 15% of the population. This was enabled due to the availability of western style education provided by American missionaries and others in the Tamil dominant Jaffna Peninsula. The preponderance of Tamils over their natural share of the population was used by populist majority Sinhalese politicians to come to political power by promising to elevate the Sinhalese people. These measures as well as riots and pogroms that targeted the minority Sri Lankan Tamils led to the formation of a number of rebel groups advocating independence for Sri Lankan Tamils. Following the 1983 Black July pogrom full scale civil war began between the government and the rebel groups.

During the 1990s the church was established as a safe and neutral zone by the UNHCR. It was free of rebel Liberation Tigers of Tamil Eelam cadres and Sri Lankan Army soldiers. The church had housed thousands of civilians as a refuge. In May 1999, the Sri Lankan Army breached the longstanding agreement of “no guns, no uniform” and took control of a formerly neutral area. The army also cleared the shrine of all refugees.

== The event ==
By early November 1999, the LTTE began a counterattack that saw it advance toward Madhu. Thousands of persons seeking to escape expected fighting sought refuge in Madhu. UNHCR was asked by the LTTE to transfer about 3,000 displaced residents of nearby Palampidy camp to Madhu church. But initially this was prevented by government troops based in Madhu. They later relented and allowed the displaced persons to reach the church. Following the reestablishment of refugee camp, the military withdrew from the church.

On November 20, government troops began to reestablish their positions in Madhu. This led to an exchanged of fire with LTTE cadres stationed nearby. Number of shells landed in the church, killing approximately 40 displaced civilians, including 13 children, and injuring nearly 60 others.

== Reactions ==
Responsibility for the attack could not be easily determined. The government and LTTE blamed the other for the deaths. The UK.-based Tamil Center for Human Rights said, "An armored column of Sri Lankan Army tanks opened fire on Madhu Church Shrine." However, the then President Kumaratunga said, "The deaths of these refugees were caused by mortar attacks carried out by the LTTE directed at the Madhu Church”. Bishop Rayappu Joseph admitted that it was the LTTE that carried out the attack.

The Catholic Church, local human rights groups, and international organizations blamed both sides for not respecting the long established neutral zone. Following the incident both the government troops and the LTTE withdrew from the immediate area. They continued to fight in nearby areas, causing approximately 14,000 people to seek refuge in the Madhu church again. By the end of the year approximately 17,000 displaced persons were housed at the church. UNHCR, which had shut down its camp at the church following the shelling, returned to assist the newly displaced refugees. With the escalation of violence in 2007-2008, the civilians sheltered in the premises had to flee further north and the holy statue of Virgin Mary itself had to be moved because of repeated shelling.

== See also ==
Similar incidents in the Northern province of Sri Lanka.

- Chencholai bombing
- Madhu school bus bombing
- Navaly church bombing
- Pesalai church attack
- St.Phillip Neri church bombing
