= Vaharai bombing =

2006 disputed bombing in Vaharai, Sri Lanka

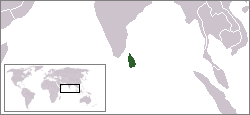
- Location of Sri Lanka
- Location: Vaharai, Batticaloa district, Sri Lanka
- Date: November 7, 2006 (+6 GMT)
- Target: Sri Lankan Tamil refugees
- Attack type: Massacre, mass murder, school shelling
- Weapon: Artillery
- Deaths: 45
- Injuries: 100
- Perpetrator: Sri Lankan Army

The Vaharai bombing is a disputed event in the Sri Lankan civil war. It occurred on November 7, 2006, when, according to survivors of the incident interviewed by Reuters, the Liberation Tigers of Tamil Eelam fired artillery at Sri Lankan military personnel from near a school where minority Sri Lankan Tamil refugees displaced by the ongoing Sri Lankan civil war had taken shelter. The Sri Lankan Army returned fire and around 45 civilians were killed. Over 100 were injured and admitted to the local hospitals. However, people who were interviewed by Human Rights Watch claimed that the LTTE did not fire artillery. Further, the rebel LTTE denies firing artillery from close to the school. The incident occurred at around 11.35 a.m close to Kathiraveli, a coastal village in Vaharai peninsula of the Batticaloa district in eastern Sri Lanka.

== The incident ==
The LTTE claimed the shelling killed 43 displaced Tamil civilians who had been taking shelter after the recent flare up of the Sri Lankan civil war. However the Sri Lanka Monitoring Mission counted 23 bodies. About 300 were wounded, 127 of them seriously. Many were killed when two shells hit school buildings housing a large number civilians. Shelling also damaged the Sonobo Children's Home seriously injuring nearly 12 infants. The town Kathiraveli in the Vaharai region is mainly populated by minority Sri Lankan Tamils and indigenous Vedda people. It was under the de facto control of the LTTE rebels.

The Sri Lankan government responded saying that the refugees housed within the school were being used as human shields by the LTTE. The Nordic ceasefire monitors, the Sri Lanka Monitoring Mission, said they did not see any LTTE military installations nearby. However the government's account was supported by survivors of the incident who had fled the area and subsequently taken shelter in government controlled territory. Reuters reported one survivor saying, "First I heard big guns fired (by the LTTE) from the camp area. I jumped into a bunker. Then the army returned fire and I heard big explosions in the camp." However, Human Rights Watch conducted interviews with 12 witnesses to the attack. All witnesses said that there were no LTTE fighters located in or adjacent to the IDP camp at the time of the attack or directly before. They also reported that the nearest LTTE military base was the Sinnakangai camp on the coast about two kilometers away. None of the interviewees had seen or heard outgoing shelling earlier that day. Another women who lived near the IDP camp claimed "Before the shelling I heard nothing. It was sudden, we didn't expect it." Another man whose children were wounded in the shelling said that there was no LTTE present near the camp and he did not hear any shelling from the LTTE.

== Reactions ==
- Sri Lankan Government - Government defence spokesman Keheliya Rambukwella said the military had targeted two Tamil Tiger artillery positions but admitted a civilian centre was also hit. "While we regret this whole episode, we also must say that national security is uppermost in our minds. Actions by the defence authorities were inevitable. The Liberation Tigers of Tamil Eelam (LTTE) had been firing mortar and artillery at government positions, as well as civilian settlements, in the region for over a week." Media Minister Anura Yapa said "The LTTE is using humans as shields to cover their operations." Another defense ministry statement read: "The Tigers had been planning this situation since the beginning of this month by detaining the innocent civilians in those areas by force to be used as a human shield when the time arises." Tamil legislators from the dominant Tamil speaking party in the Sri Lankan parliament, Tamil National Alliance demonstrated in front of the United Nations local offices of UNICEF and handed over a petition to the UN offices demanding intervention to protect refugees in the island's troubled areas. "We urge your good selves to take immediate action regarding this matter and take steps to safeguard the internally displaced Tamil speaking people and other civilians" the legislators told the UN High Commissioner for Refugees. Subsequently, a Tamil National Alliance parliamentarian, Nadarajah Raviraj who had demonstrated in front of the UN offices was shot and killed in Colombo.
- Tamil Tigers - There was widespread anger amongst the Tamil community in Sri Lanka. The Tamil Tigers said in a statement on their website, "Is it possible that the Sri Lankan military's intention was to teach the Tamils the lesson that they, the military, can kill refugees in such numbers, and no one can stop them?"
- The Chief Minister of the Indian state of Tamil Nadu, M. Karunanidhi, deplored the incident and pondered "how long it could tolerate the Sri Lankan Army's atrocities against Tamils there."
- United Nations- The United Nations strongly condemned the attack and considered it an "indiscriminate use of force" on civilians.
- Amnesty International - The international human rights group urged the government of Sri Lanka to investigate the attack on the civilians as matter of urgency. Amnesty International's Asia Pacific Director Purna Sen said in a press release, "It is appalling that the military should attack a camp for displaced people - these are civilians who have already been forced from their homes because of the conflict…killing and injuring civilians can never be justified. The government must investigate this terrible attack as a matter of urgency. It must ensure that those responsible are brought to justice to signal to the rest of the military that attacking civilians will not be tolerated."
- The US State Department strongly condemned the incident and exhorted the "Sri Lankan Government to adopt corrective measures to prevent civilian casualties that also take into account instances where civilians may be used as 'human shields' in the future," and expected "an immediate, independent investigation into the November 8 incidents and bring the responsible parties to justice."
- International Committee of the Red Cross - A spokesman said they evacuated 74 wounded from a hospital in the rebel-held area to a government-controlled area.
- The Humanitarian Law Project in a letter to the United Nations High Commissioner, severely condemned the actions of the Sri Lankan army and considered the artillery attack on the Vaharai refugee camp a "war crime".

== Accusations of blocked humanitarian aid ==
The LTTE political head for the Trincomalee district claimed "The government has already blocked the relief assistance to the internally displaced persons in Vaharai area. They were provided dry rations under the United Nations' World Food Programme and that was too stopped for three weeks." In addition, the LTTE accused the Sri Lankan government of preventing ambulances carrying the injured to pass military checkpoints for nearly three hours.

== See also ==
- List of attacks on civilians attributed to Sri Lankan government forces
- Easter Rising
