= List of riots in Sri Lanka =

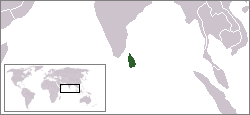
Location of Sri Lanka

Following is a list of riots and protests in Sri Lanka, an island nation situated in South Asia. Throughout its history, Sri Lanka has experienced a number of riots. Since 1915, many of them have stemmed from ethnic tensions between the Sinhalese majority and minority Tamil and Moor populations.

== 19th century ==
- 1883 Kotahena riots − Riots erupt after Buddhists proceeding in procession to the Deepaduttarama Viharaya in Kotahena are attacked by a group of Roman Catholics.

== 20th century ==
=== 1915 ===
- 1915 Sinhalese-Muslim riots − Riots between Sinhalese and Sri Lankan Moors erupt in Kandy after a group of Moors attack a Buddhist pageant with stones. Riots soon spread across the entire island.

=== 1950s ===
- 1953 Ceylonese Hartal − a nationwide demonstration or hartal against the incumbent United National Party government which eventually led to civil unrest. It was one of the riots which did not involve ethnicity and was conducted by several leftist groups.
- 1956 anti-Tamil pogrom − The first major Sinhalese-Tamil riots in Ceylon. The majority of victims were Sri Lankan Tamils in Gal Oya, a new settlement in the Eastern Province. The total number of deaths was reportedly 150.
- 1958 anti-Tamil pogrom − Also known as the '58 riots. The riots were a watershed event for ethnic relationships in Sri Lanka. The total number of deaths was estimated to be 300, mostly Sri Lankan Tamils.

=== 1960s ===
- 1966 − Demonstrations in Colombo organized by the Sri Lanka Freedom Party, left-wing parties, and trade unions in protest of the Tamil Regulations Act escalate into riots, forcing the government to declare a state of emergency.
- 1969 − The Ceylon Communist Party (Maoist) conduct a mass rally which ended in bloodshed, the major cause for the riot being the banning of the May Day rally.

=== 1970s ===
- 1971 − Ceylonese protests against the Vietnam War: began at the height of the Cold War, with few clashes between various leftist groups and the Sri Lankan police.
- 1976 anti-Muslim violence in Puttalam − series of organised violence against Muslims of Puttalam by Sinhalese mobs, which culminated in the killing of seven Muslims in the Puttalam Jumma Mosque by the police on 2 February.
- 1977 anti-Tamil pogrom − began on 12 August 1977, less than a month after the United National Party came to power. Over 300 Tamils were killed during the riots.

=== 1980s ===
- 1981 anti-Tamil pogrom − carried out by Sinhalese mobs predominantly against Sri Lankan Tamils and Indian Tamils in Ratnapura, Kahawatta and Balangoda. Shops were looted and set on fire and many Tamil women and girls were raped by marauding mobs.
  - Burning of the Jaffna Public Library − the Jaffna Public Library is burnt by a mob of Sinhalese individuals, resulting in the loss of over 100,000 books, artifacts and palm writings. Four Sri Lankan Tamils are killed.
- 1983 anti-Tamil pogrom in Trincomalee – organised violence by Sinhalese mobs and security forces, which targeted the Tamil population of Trincomalee between June and July 1983.
- 1983 − Black July: an anti-Tamil pogrom, between 400 and 3,000 Tamil civilians were killed and many more made homeless and refugees. The riots were believed to be the main cause of the Sri Lankan civil war.
  - Welikada prison massacre – In the Welikada Prison, 53 Tamil prisoners are attacked and killed by Sinhalese inmates assisted by prison authorities.
- 1985 anti-Tamil violence in Karaitivu – organised violence by Muslim mobs and security forces, which targeted the Tamil population of Karaitivu in 1985.
- 1985 Trincomalee massacres – organised violence by security forces and Sinhalese mobs, which targeted the Tamil population of Trincomalee in 1985.
- 1986 Kalmunai Riots – Clashes between Tamils and Muslims across the Kalmunai District result in 12 people dead. The violence damaged about 400 houses, 100 fishing boats, 50 businesses and six rice mills; a Saivite temple and an Islamic educational institution were also attacked and damaged.
- 1987 Trincomalee riots − riots against the Sinhalese carried about by Tamil mobs, backed by Tamil militant leaders in Trincomalee which later morphed into LTTE violence against the Sinhalese. Over 200 Sinhalese were killed and thousands were rendered homeless or displaced.

=== 1990s ===
- 1997 − Kalutara prison riots: Three Tamil detainees are killed at the Kalutara high security detention center on 12 December 1997.
- 8 September 1998 − In Ratnapura, a riot against Indian Tamils erupts, where 200 organised Sinhalese mobs with the support of local Sinhala politicians burn down 800 houses. The rape of several Tamil women by Sinhalese men is also reported. The riot was sparked by the murder of two Sinhalese youths, one of them in Bandusena, who had a reputation for raping women and being involved in illegal liquor sales. The Sinhalese attackers were given full impunity by the local police and no one was held accountable for their crimes.

== 21st century ==
=== 2000s ===
- 2000 – Bindunuwewa massacre: A Sinhalese mob kill 27 Tamil detainees at a detention centre in Bindunuwewa, Badulla.
- 2001 − Mawanella riots: Clashes between Sinhalese and Muslims in Mawanella result in the deaths of 2 people, and leave more than 15 injured and property destroyed. Sinhalese mobs attacked several Muslim-owned shops, and vice versa.
- 2002 − Beruwala riots: Sectarian clashes spark between the Wahabbi and the Sunni sects of the Muslim community in Beruwala, leaving at least 3 dead and over 16 injured following police intervention.
- 2005 Inuvil shooting and protests – the killing of a barber in Inuvil, Jaffna by soldiers results in protests by locals in which a police officer is abducted and killed.
- 2006 anti-Tamil riots in Trincomalee – organised violence by Sinhalese mobs and security forces, which targeted the Tamil population of Trincomalee in April 2006.

=== 2010s ===
- 2012 Welikada prison riot − A riot in the Welikada Prison in November 2012 results in the death of 27 prisoners and 43 injuries.
- 2014 anti-Muslim riots − Clashes between Sinhalese and Muslims across the Kalutara District result in four dead and 80 injured.
- 2018 anti-Muslim riots − Clashes between Sinhalese and Muslims erupt in the town of Ampara and across the Kandy District, resulting in two deaths and 15 injuries.
- 2019 anti-Muslim riots − A islandwide series of attacks on Muslims, Muslim-owned property and businesses, and mosques in retaliation for the 2019 Sri Lanka Easter bombings.

=== 2020s ===
- 2020 − Mahara prison riot: A riot erupts in Mahara Prison following rumors that prisoners infected with COVID-19 from other prisons would be transferred to Mahara Prison. The riot resulted in 11 inmates dead and 117 inmates severely injured.
- 2022 Sri Lankan protests – Across the island, several protests erupt against the incumbent government of president Gotabaya Rajapaksa due to poor management of the ongoing economic crisis, severe inflation and shortages of fuel and other essential items.
- 2026 – clashes between rival inmate groups erupt at the Negombo Prison, culminating in a 2-day riot leaving 28 dead and more than 100 injured.

== See also ==
- Sri Lankan civil war
- Human rights in Sri Lanka
