= Burning of the Jaffna Public Library =

1981 arson during the anti-Tamil pogrom

- Part of the 1981 anti-Tamil pogrom
- The Jaffna Public Library after burning
- Date: 31 May 1981
- Location: Jaffna, Northern Province, Sri Lanka; 9.6621°N 80.0118°E
- Caused by: Ethnic tensions between Tamils and Sinhalese
- Goals: Destruction of Tamil cultural symbols
- Methods: Arson, looting, book burning
- Status: Concluded (Library was destroyed)
- Result: Destruction of the library, loss of thousands of books and manuscripts

Parties
Sri Lankan Armed Forces	Tamil civilians and activists

Lead figures
Senior members of Sri Lankan government and military	Tamil political and cultural leaders

Casualties and losses
Unknown	Unknown

Casualties (unclear if specific to the event)
- Death: None directly attributed
- Injuries: Unknown
- Arrested: None
- Damage: Extensive damage to the library
- Buildings destroyed: 1 (Jaffna Public Library)
- Detained: None
- Charged: No formal charges filed
- Fined: None
- Cultural and political impact: Major cultural loss, loss of historical records, increased ethnic tensions
- The destruction of the library remains a symbol of ethnic tensions and the Sri Lankan Civil War's impact on Tamil cultural heritage.

The Jaffna Public Library was burned by an organized mob of Sinhalese police and army on the night of 31 May 1981, on the orders of members of the ruling UNP party. The library's burning was one of the most violent examples of ethnically motivated biblioclasm of the 20th century. At the time of its destruction, the library was one of the biggest in Asia, containing over 97,000 books and manuscripts.

== Background ==
The library was built in many stages starting from 1933, from a modest beginning as a private collection of philanthropist and linguist scholar K. M. Chellappah. Soon, with the help of primarily local citizens, it became a full-fledged library. The library also became a repository of archival material written in palm leaf manuscripts, original copies of regionally important historic documents in the contested political history of Sri Lanka and newspapers that were published hundreds of years ago in the Jaffna peninsula. It thus became a place of historic and symbolic importance to all Sri Lankans.

Eventually, the first major wing of the library was opened in 1959 by then Jaffna mayor Alfred Duraiappah. The architect of the Indo-Saracenic style building was S. Narasimhan from Madras, India. Prominent Indian librarian S.R. Ranganathan served as an advisor to ensure that the library was built to international standards. The library became the pride of the local people as even researchers from India and other countries began to use it for their research purposes.

== The riot and the burning ==
Damaged dome with holes made by shelling

In 1981, Tamils in Jaffna hoped to remedy their lack of political representation during elections. The Sinhalese United National Party however were determined to control the election results and sent police, thugs and paramilitaries to intimidate Tamil voters. On Sunday 31 May 1981, the Tamil United Liberation Front (TULF), a regionally popular democratic party, held a rally in which two policemen Sergeant Punchi Banda and constable Kanagasuntharam were shot and killed by PLOTE gunmen. Within 30 minutes, jeaploads and truckloads of policemen descended on the scene and started rioting. They set alight shops, houses, cars and vehicles.

That night police, army and paramilitaries began a pogrom that lasted for three days. The head office of TULF party was destroyed. The Jaffna MP V. Yogeswaran's residence was also destroyed.

Four people were pulled from their homes and killed at random. Many business establishments and a local Hindu temple were also deliberately destroyed. Five book shops were burned to ashes. In total, over a hundred shops were burnt, broken or looted.

On the night of 1 June, according to many eyewitnesses, police, army and government-sponsored paramilitias set fire to the Jaffna public library and destroyed it completely. Army officers were witnessed pulling down books and throwing them into the fire. Over 97,000 volumes of books along with numerous culturally important and irreplaceable manuscripts were destroyed. Among the destroyed items were scrolls of historical value and the works and manuscripts of philosopher, artist and author Ananda Coomaraswamy and prominent intellectual Prof. Dr. Isaac Thambiah. The destroyed articles included memoirs and works of writers and dramatists who made a significant contribution toward the sustenance of the Tamil culture, and those of locally reputed physicians and politicians.

The office of the Eelanaadu, a local newspaper, was also destroyed. Statues of Tamil cultural and religious figures were destroyed or defaced.

The Movement for Inter-Racial Justice and Equality (MIRJE) who sent an investigative team to Jaffna after the riot concluded:

"After careful inquiries there is no doubt that the attacks and the arson were the work of some 100-175 police personnel."

Nancy Murray, an American civil rights activist, wrote in a 1984 journal article that several high-ranking security officers and two cabinet ministers Gamini Dissanayake and Cyril Mathew were present in the town of Jaffna, when uniformed security men and plainclothes mob carried out organized acts of destruction. After 20 years the government-owned Daily News newspaper, in an editorial in 2001, termed the 1981 event an act by "goon squads let loose by the then government".

== Reactions ==
=== Tamil public ===
The priest and scholar Rev. Fr. (Dr.) H. S. David died of shock the next day after seeing flames engulfing Jaffna Library from his room at St. Patrick's College, Jaffna the night before.

Of all the destruction in Jaffna city, it was the destruction of the Jaffna Public Library that was the incident which appeared to cause the most distress to the people of Jaffna. Twenty years later, the mayor of Jaffna Nadarajah Raviraj still grieved at the recollection of the flames he saw as a university student.

For Tamils, the devastated library became a symbol of "physical and imaginative violence". The attack was seen as an assault on their aspirations, the value of learning and traditions of academic achievement. The attack also became the rallying point for Tamil rebels to promote the idea to the Tamil populace that their race was targeted for annihilation.

=== Liberation Tigers of Tamil Eelam ===
Prabhakaran, the leader of the LTTE, angrily witnessed the Jaffna Library in flames and muttered in Tamil "Kalasara Pererippu" (cultural incineration). He later told interviewers:

“The Sinhalese, who with impunity torched Jaffna, the cultural capital of the Sri Lankan Tamils, who burnt down the Jaffna Library, should be taught that Tamils would never be their subject race.”

=== Government of Sri Lanka ===
Two cabinet ministers, who saw the destruction of government and private properties from the verandah of the Jaffna Rest House (a government-owned hotel), claimed that the incident was "an unfortunate event, where [a] few policemen got drunk and went on a looting spree all on their own."

The national newspapers did not report the incident. Later that year, President J. R. Jayewardene admitted to the foreign press that the UNP had encouraged the anti-Tamil violence. According to Amnesty International's 1982 fact-finding mission to Sri Lanka, the UNP government did not attempt an independent investigation to establish responsibility for these killings in May and June 1981 and take measures against those responsible.

In subsequent parliamentary debates some majority Sinhalese members invoked the perpetual foreigner trope. Supposedly, if Tamils were unhappy in Sri Lanka, then they should leave for their "homeland" in India if they felt that Sri Lanka was discriminatory.

In later years, the burning of the library featured in political rhetoric.

In 1991 the then-president of Sri Lanka Ranasinghe Premadasa blamed Lalith Athulathmudali and Gamini Dissanayake for the destruction of the library.

In 2006, then-president of Sri Lanka Mahinda Rajapakse told his audience that burning the Library sacred to the people of Jaffna was similar to shooting down Lord Buddha and concluded that the event and other contemporary atrocities led directly to the militant LTTE.

In 2016, Prime Minister Ranil Wickremesinghe as the leader of the United National Party apologized for the burning of the library which happened during a UNP government. He was interrupted by the shouting of Joint Opposition MPs for which he claimed:

The Jaffna Library was burnt during the time of our government. We regret it. We apologize for it. Do you also apologize for the wrongs you committed?

In 2026, Prime Minister Harini Amarasuriya acknowledged the library burning as part of the country's dark history, arguing that such events demonstrate the need for a culture that values literature as a part of historical preservation.

== Reopening ==
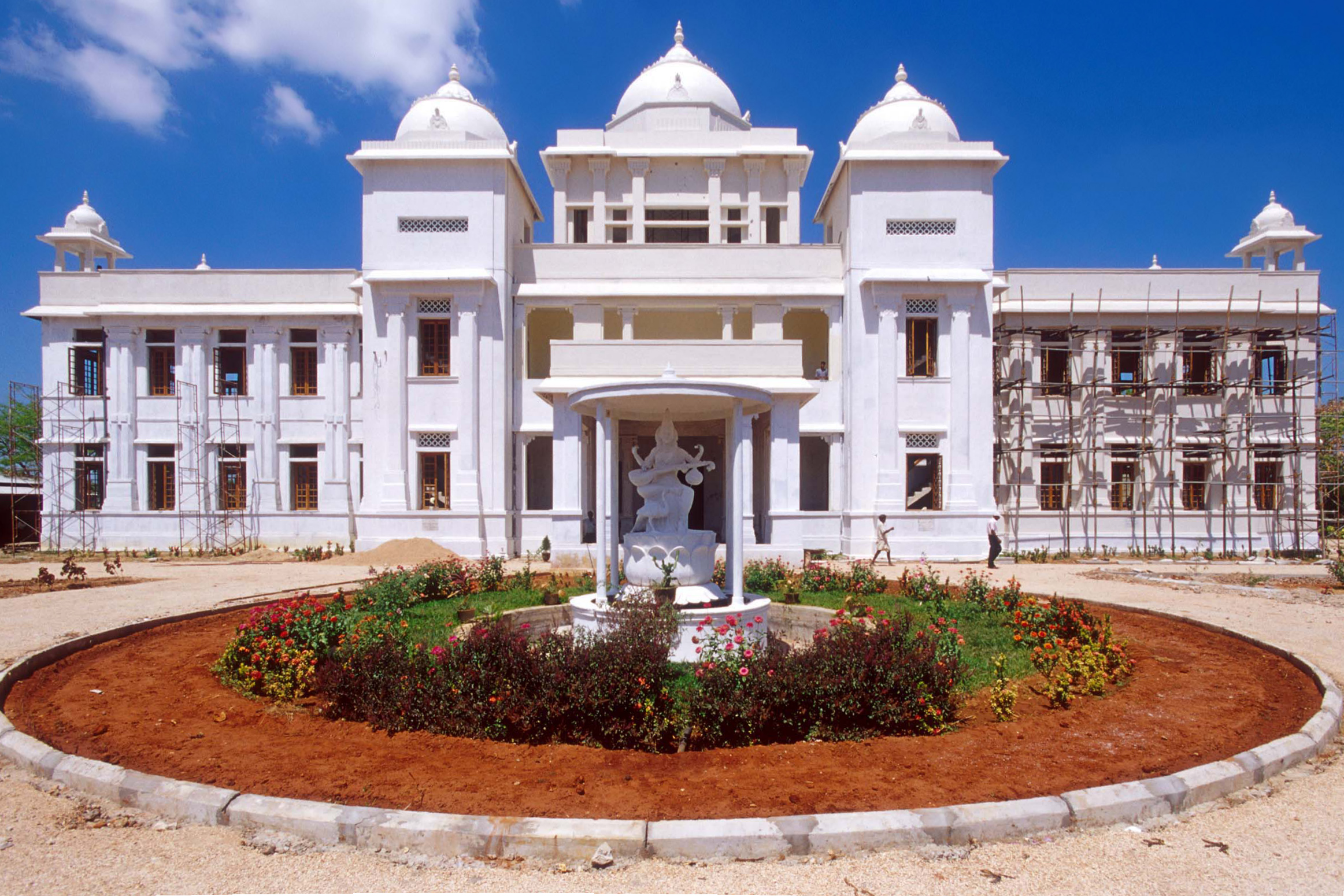
Jaffna Public Library being rebuilt, with partly burned right-wing. At the front is a statue of Saraswati, the Hindu goddess of learning.

In 1982, one year after the initial destruction, the community sponsored Jaffna Public Library Week and collected thousands of books. Repairs on parts of the building were in progress when the Black July pogrom-induced civil conflict began in 1983. By 1984, the library was fully renovated; however, the library was damaged by bullets and bombs. The military forces were stationed in the Jaffna Fort and the rebels positioned themselves inside the library creating a no man's land as the fighting intensified. In 1985, after an attack on a nearby police station by Tamil rebels, soldiers entered the partially restored building and set off bombs that shredded thousands of books yet again. The library was abandoned with its shell and bullet-pocked walls, blackened with the smoke of burnt books.

In 1998, in an effort to win the confidence of the Tamil people, the government under President Chandrika Kumaratunga began the process of rebuilding the library by launching a fund raising campaign throughout the country. With additional contributions from international donors, the library was rebuilt at a cost of around US$1 million and 25,000 books were collected. It was reopened to the public in 2003 "largely devoid of books" but the opening ceremony was postponed due to pressure from the Tamil public and the LTTE. Some citizens, a large number of Tamil intellectuals and the LTTE had wanted the preservation of either a part or all of the burned building as a memorial and the construction of a replacement library in a different location but the government rejected it fearing that it might bolster Tamil nationalism.

== See also ==
- 1981 Anti-Tamil pogrom
- Book burning
- Cultural genocide
- Burning of books and burying of scholars
- Burning of Nalanda University Library
- List of anti-minority pogroms in Sri Lanka
- Sri Lankan Civil War
- List of destroyed libraries
- List of attacks on civilians attributed to Sri Lankan government forces
- Destruction of Library of Alexandria
- Mayan codices
- National and University Library of Bosnia and Herzegovina
