= 2019 anti-Muslim riots in Sri Lanka =

Series of religiously motivated riots targeting Muslims in Sri Lanka

Anti-Muslim riots in Sri Lanka
- Part of aftermath of the 2019 Sri Lanka Easter bombings
- Kurunegala District; Gampaha District; Kandy District
- Location: Chilaw and North Western Province, Sri Lanka
- Date: 6–16 May 2019 (UTC+05:30)
- Target: Mosques, Muslim-owned property, and Muslim civilians
- Attack type: Widespread looting, assault, arson
- Weapons: Axes, guns, explosives, knives, swords
- Deaths: 1
- Injuries: 100+
- Victim: Muslim civilians
- Perpetrator: Sinhalese Buddhist mobs
- No. of participants: Thousands
- Motive: Retaliation for the 2019 Sri Lanka Easter bombings

The 2019 anti-Muslim riots in Sri Lanka were a series of religiously motivated riots targeting Muslims in Sri Lanka. The riots originated as isolated incidents in Chilaw, perpetrated in retaliation for the 2019 Sri Lanka Easter bombings, eventually spreading to much of the North Western Province and its surrounding areas.

Muslim citizens, mosques and other properties were attacked by mobs of Sinhala Buddhist nationalists, and in at least one incident attacks were carried out by a Christian-majority mob. Only one death was reported, Saleem Ameer who was killed by a mob wielding swords. Other sources claimed 9 deaths, but said claims are unconfirmed. Other news agencies reported that over 540 Muslim-owned houses and properties were destroyed during the riots, in addition to upwards of 100 vehicles.

Similar to the anti-Muslim riots of 2018, locals in affected areas noted the arrival of outsiders in buses to participate in the rioting, raising suspicions that the riots had been coordinated in advance.

On 3 June 2019, all Muslim cabinet ministers, state ministers, and deputy ministers resigned from their positions. At a media briefing, Minister Rauff Hakeem stated that the decision was made to allow space for thorough and unhindered investigations of alleged terror links of politicians..

As of 6 June 2019, propagation of hate speech and fake news has been made a crime, liable of imprisonment not exceeding 5 years, a fine exceeding Rs. 1 million ($ 5,600), or both. The move was proposed by Ranjith Maddumabandara in his capacity as Acting Minister of Justice, and approved by the cabinet decision.

== Arrests ==
On 14 May, Sri Lankan authorities arrested 23 people in connection with the riots. Amongst those remanded into custody was Amith Weerasinghe, the leader of the Sinhala-Buddhist group Mahason Balakaya, who was taken in for questioning regarding his role in the riots, and regarding his alleged racial and religious hate speech, posted and distributed through social media channels. Additionally, Namal Kumara, an anti-corruption activist previously involved with a plot to assassinate President Maithripala Sirisena was arrested.

On 18 May, Parliamentarian Dayasiri Jayasekara arrived at the office of the Deputy Inspector General, urging that the arrested rioters be released on bail; Weerashinge was subsequently granted bail, on two sureties of Rs. 1 million each. On 21 June, CEO of Derana Dilith Jayaweera was charged with violating the International Covenant on Civil and Political Rights, due to a controversial speech he made at a book launch.

== Damage ==
According to the U.S. State Department's 2019 International Religious Freedom Report on Sri Lanka, police reported a total of 60 persons arrested in connection with the mob violence — though only nine arrests were made in Hettipola, 10 in Kuliyapitiya, and 14 in Minuwangoda, despite video evidence showing significantly larger mobs in these areas. Among those arrested were leaders of Sinhalese nationalist groups, including Amith Weerasinghe of Mahason Balakaya, Dan Priyasad of New Sinha Le, and Namal Kumara of the Anti-Corruption Front; all were subsequently released.

== Anti-Muslim incidents ==
=== Incidents ===
- On 28 April 2019, six unidentified individuals were arrested after they were caught planting false evidence at a Muslim man's house, when he was out for prayers. The group, who were not identified by news agencies, were in possession of explosives at the time of arrest.
- On 9 May, more than 1,000 Muslim refugees were evicted from their rented houses in Negombo, after landlords feared that mobs would attack their properties. According to Daily Mirror, there were 844 refugees and 826 asylum seekers in the country, in 2018. On the same day, 12 Muslim teachers of Puwakpitiya Tamil Maha Vidyalaya were transferred to other schools after they were chased away by parents. They wore the Abaya to school, and refused to wear the Sari.
- On 13 May, rioters destroyed and set houses and businesses on fire, and a vandalised a nearby mosque, after a Muslim man posted a comment on Facebook, that rioters mistook as a threat. The incident subsequently sparked more rioting in the wider region.
- On the same day, violent rioters destroyed the Rs. 700 million (US$4 million) Muslim-owned Roza Pasta Factory, which was Sri Lanka's largest pasta factory. Local witnesses stated 300-400 rioters entered the factory to set it on fire. Viral videos of incident show the large factory complex and machinery still burning hours after the rioting. Reports also claim that the Fire Department refused to douse the blaze and never arrived at the scene, stating that they are out of water.
- In a separate incident on 13 May, a mob slashed 45-year-old Jiffriya Ameer with swords and knives in front of his three children and wife, before pouring turpentine on his wounds and face. Mobs also set fire to their vehicle, which disabled them from reaching the hospital sooner. He was pronounced dead shortly after admission to the Puttalam Hospital. It was the first death relating to the anti-Muslim violence. In a TV address, Chief of the Sri Lanka Police Chandana Wickramaratne warned that police will take stern action against rioters, and constables have been issued orders to use maximum force.
- On May 14, a Muslim family doing tailoring business in Hunupitiya, consisting of a mother, three daughters, and five grandchildren was taken into protective custody after Sinhalese neighbours found out that they were in possession of orange cloth similar to clothing worn by Buddhist monks. After police failed to control the sword-wielding mob, the Special Task Force arrived and successfully rescued the family.
- By 16 May rioters were suppressed and the Government removed curfew. However isolated incidents were reported such as a Buddhist monk being caught on CCTV in Padiyathalawa, chasing out Sinhalese customers from a Muslim-owned clothes shop, and threatening the owners. The monk was not identified, and no further reports of the incident surfaced.
- On 21 May, a viral post shared by Sinhalese and a few local news companies claimed to show Muslim restaurant staff cleaning crockery in dirty drainage water. After being shared and viewed tens of thousands of times, the footage was subsequently proven by Agence France-Presse to be a foreign video from 2018.
- On 23 May, a Muslim passenger on SriLankan Airlines UL605 from Melbourne to Colombo was detained for reading the Quran inflight. The passenger was detained for 12-hours by CID after the crew reported the suspicious activity to ground staff. In a statement issued the airline denied any discrimination, and stated that they were following standard protocol.
- On 27 May, a woman who wore clothing that resembles the Dharmachakra was arrested. The woman could not obtain bail as she was arrested under the International Covenant on Civil and Political Rights. The arrest sparked controversy as many argued that the woman's clothing only resembled the wheel of a ship.
- On 3 June, three Muslim men were taken into protective custody after supporters of Athuraliye Rathana Thero beat them for failing to prove their identity, at the site of the monk's protest.
- On 17 June, chief prelate of the Asgiriya chapter Warakagoda Sri Gnanarathana claimed that Buddhist women the doctor involved in the sterilisation controversy stoned and approved their statements. He also asked to boycott Muslim-owned shops, and for Sinhala-Buddhists to reject food offered by Muslims stating that it will lead to infertility. Despite violating the International Covenant on Civil and Political Rights and imposed local emergency laws, no action was taken against the senior monk. Minister of Finance Mangala Samaraweera condemned the monk's racially charged speech.
- On 24 June, SLPP member and Wennappuwa Pradeshiya Sabha chairman K V Susantha Perera issued a controversial circular banning Muslim vendors from using the Dankotuwa Sathi marketplace. The circular further stated that the move was done to "preserve peace in the area". The Marawila Magistrate's Court subsequently ordered the chairman to provide further explanation on the ban. The Sri Lanka Police overturned the local government ban on 25 June, with the local police superintendent commenting that it was done to curb the spread of Islamaphobia.
- On 25 June, the Janaposha Foundation ceased the distribution of free meals to patients and visitors of the National Hospital of Sri Lanka, Kalubowila Hospital, and the Maharagama Cancer Hospital, citing safety concerns of staff. The decision was made after negative remarks by Minister Gamini Lokuge on the Foundation's links to Muslims. The Foundation began operations in 2012, and served approximately half a million free meals annually.

== Release of Galagoda Aththe Gnanasara ==
Buddhist hardline monk and general secretary of Bodu Bala Sena (Buddhist Power Force) Galagoda Aththe Gnanasara, was arrested in August 2018 for contempt of court to serve a 6-year sentence. Since 2014, the monk has also faced accusations in cases regarding anti-Muslim violence, hate speech, and defaming the Koran, and was also caught on video last year, plotting anti-Muslim attacks with the Mahason Balakaya, another Buddhist hardline group. He is also known to have signed a pact with Myanmar's Ashin Wirathu, a key figure in Myanmar's anti-Muslim riots and massacres.

On 18 May 2019, a senior official from the Department of Prisons confirmed that there was no plan of releasing the monk under presidential pardon on Vesak Poya Day, a Buddhist religious holiday, although 762 prisoners were expected to be released.

On 22 May 2019, in a shock move which were condemned by many including International Crisis Group, Gnanasara was released under a special presidential pardon by Maithripala Sirisena, without further comments from the president's office.

On 23 May 2019, Gnanasara made a public statement asking his supporters to be calm and to act judiciously for the sake of the country. He further went on to state that he will spend the rest of his days by following the Dhamma as a Buddhist monk. The following day, he attended a special meeting at the President's office.

On 28 May 2019, in another shock move, Gnanasara stated that "there is no time to rest, no time to engage in Dhamma and meditation; attaining nirvana can wait", and vowed to resume his activities as the BBS secretary.

On 2 June 2019, speaking to the media, Gnanasara promised to cause countrywide pandemonium (sanakeli) if the government does not take action on his demands of removing the controversial Muslim politicians from the parliament.

On 7 June Gnanasara's travel ban was temporarily lifted as he received a foreign scholarship and announced that he will leave Sri Lanka for studies.

== Alleged collusion by security forces ==
In Minuwangoda, police and armed forces were accused of allowing rioters get away with crimes, with at least one incident where police officers watched as rioters destroyed property.

Collusion by security forces has also been captured on CCTV, which purportedly show a soldier signalling towards a group of rioters and disappearing off screen, seconds before the group including officers, starts attacking a mosque. On 17 May, Lieutenant General Mahesh Senanayake explained that the soldier had not invited the mob, but instead was fixing the strap of his firearm.

== Causes ==
The rioters initially attacked the Muslim population in retaliation of the Easter bombings, which saw a series of terror attacks carried out by ISIL-backed National Thowheeth Jama'ath (NTJ). It subsequently escalated to the Islamophobic sentiment in the country, after more incidents and a number of rumour-based news articles worsened the situation. Fears of xenophobia were also evident in early June.

The government blocked major social media networks and messaging services Facebook, Instagram, WhatsApp, Viber, Snapchat and YouTube during peak rioting. The blocking included VPN service providers that could be used to circumvent the blocks.

=== Alleged terror links of Muslim politicians ===
The activities of NTJ and its leader Zahran Cassim were known as early as 2014, with a number of public protests and demonstrations carried out by the Kattankudy Muslim community, urging the government to take action. In 2016, twenty-three Muslim Religious and Civil Society organizations headed by the All Ceylon Jamiyyathul Ulama issued a statement against activities of the NTJ. The NTJ was known by the community to incite violence against non-Muslims. In 2017, it had carried out a brutal sword attack against the Muslims who stood against the group's ideologies. Despite the incidents and protests, the failure of any action against the NTJ was deemed as a major government failure.

On 10 May 2019, several hartals were held in Trincomalee and suburbs, demanding the removal of Eastern Province governor Mahamood Hizbullah. On 30 May Ven. Warakapola Indrasiri Nayake Thera, Eastern Province Sangha Nayake and Chief Incumbent of Muhudu Maha Viharaya in Pottuvil revealed that Islamic extremists supported by Hizbullah are renaming places in the Eastern Province in Arabic and illegally taking over archaeological sites in what was called an "Islamic rule" . The road to the Muhudu Maha Viharaya itself was renamed "Masjithul Palah Road". The accusations were backed by the Federation of Kattankudy Mosques and Institutions who accused Hizbullah of beginning mass Arabaization of the East and claimed that Muslims only learn Arabic to understand the Quran and do not support Arabic name boards.

When questioned by the PSC Hizbullah claimed that the Arabic name boards were to attract tourists and when questioned over meeting Zahran Hashim he claimed that Muslim politicians from the Sri Lanka Muslim Congress as well as the UPFA and UNP had met Zahran before the 2015 General Election due to his followers having 2000-3000 votes. He accepted that they knew him as an extremist preacher but at the time he was not considered terrorist. The Muslim politicians signed an agreement which included a ban on music and gender segregation which his supporters violated by using music in rallies. Hizbullah blamed Zahran acting against him after the incident for his election defeat. However, when the PSC questioned Maulavi K. R. M. Sahlan who represents the Sufi Sect it was revealed that the agreement included more controversial clauses such as refusal to support "moderate" Muslims and Sufis as well as a condition saying the political parties should support extremists such as the National Thawheed Jama'ath. Sahlan revealed that in addition to Hizbullah those that signed the agreement included Shafi Salley, Shibly Farook, A.L.M. Ruby and Abdul Rahman

Parliamentarian and Buddhist monk Athuraliye Rathana Thero began a fast-unto-death at the Temple of the Tooth on 31 May 2019, demanding the removal of Muslim politicians Rishad Bathiudeen, Mahamood Hizbullah, and Azath Salley.

On 1 June, a monk and President of Jathika Sangha Sammelanaya, Liyanwala Sasanaratana, urged people to join the efforts of Rathana Thero, to save the nation from terrorists. Other monks joined gathered at the location, chanting pirith. Cardinal Malcolm Ranjith also visited the monk, on 3 June. Malcolm's visit was criticised by the Minister of Finance Mangala Samaraweera, who stated in a tweet that the "Cardinal fanned flames of hatred by visiting robed MP Rathana". Mangala's tweet resulted in him being banned by clergy, to attend a number of Buddhist temples in the country, and a condemnation by the Catholic Church.

On 3 June, Athuraliye Rathana broke his fast, and was hospitalised, after Azath and Hizbullah voluntary resigned due to growing pressure. Rishad too stepped down, later that day, in a separate process.

In a separate event on the same day, all Muslim cabinet ministers, state ministers, and deputy ministers, resigned from their official positions, to allow space for investigators to conduct thorough investigations of possible terror links of politicians. On 5 June, a statement was issued by the chief prelates of the Maha Sangha (Buddhist organisation) consisting of the three largest Buddhist monastic orders, Siam Nikaya, Amarapura Nikaya, and Ramanna Nikaya, expressing disappointment in the resignations, and urging them to accept their own responsibilities and fulfil duties to serve the people of the country.

On 4 June, the Police Headquarters set up a three-member committee, comprising a Senior Superintendent of Police and two Superintendents of Police, to accept complaints against Bathiudeen, Hizbullah, and Salley; by 6 June, the committee had received four complaints — three against Bathiudeen and one against Salley. Bathiudeen denied the allegations, and on 28 June, the Acting Inspector General of Police informed the Parliamentary Select Committee (PSC) investigating the Easter attacks that no evidence had been found linking him to terrorism. Salley and Hizbullah also testified before the PSC in June, with Salley alleging that former Defence Secretary Gotabaya Rajapaksa had links to Thowheed Jamath and had used the group for political purposes, a claim Salley raised after accusing an unnamed intelligence officer of offering him Rs. 200 million to stay silent during his election campaign.

=== Batticaloa Campus ===
Politicians and certain media outlets portrayed the Juffali-funded Batticaloa Campus as a "Sharia University", which commenced developments during the Rajapaksa cabinet. While sharia law, Islamic studies, and Islamic banking would be taught at the campus, there are no verifiable claims that the campus will be run by, or will exclusively teach, Sharia law. Mahamood Hizbullah, a key figure behind the project, also rejected the claims.

On 8 May 2019, the President stated that the campus will be under the purview of the Ministry of Higher Education and Highways. When Hizbullah was questioned by the PSC it was revealed that the funding from Saudi Arabia violated Foreign Exchange Laws of Sri Lanka.

=== Discovery of swords and weapons ===
Swords, weapons, and explosives were found in multiple locations and houses, including mosques, during countrywide raids.

Controversy arose after some of the sword discoveries in mosques were defended by Minister of Muslim Religious Affairs Hashim Abdul Haleem as being items used to clear yards and surrounding shrubs around certain religious places. He also stated that camouflage uniforms were an isolated case where the clothing was for re-sale as proven with receipts. In the statement, he requested the Muslim community to cooperate with security, avoiding different types of face covering. Maduluwawe Sobitha Thero questioned the remarks, and urged Muslim leaders to stop humiliating the entire country by making such statements.

Locations at which suspicious items were found
Date	Location	Items recovered	Suspects	Ref
26 April 2019	A mosque in Palliyaweediya, Slave Island	40 swords, kris knives, suicide jacket without explosives, clothing resembling Army uniforms	2 arrests	
27 April 2019	A mosque in Maskeliya	49 kitchen knives, 3 axes	One person in custody	
27 April 2019	SLPP Deputy Mayor of Negombo, Mohamed Ansar Seinul Fariz	1 sword, 1 machete, 1 dagger, stock of mobile phone batteries	In custody	
3 May 2019	House of a hospital security officer, Pulmoddai area	89 detonators, 32 service thread, 2 detonator charges, 8l of water gel	Suspect fled, brother in custody	
3 May 2019	Kandy and Wattegama areas	12 bore gun, 12 knives, video camera	13 suspects in custody	
3 May 2019	Motorcyclist in Katuwana, Hikkaduwa	2 locally produced firearms, 6 bullets, 2 two mobile phones	1 arrested, 1 hospitalised	
3 May 2019	Car park near the Vavuniya town council	38 meters of wire, C4 explosives		
3 May 2019	Wewagedara area, Kurunegala	10 knives, 2 swords, a wire roll	2 suspects in custody	
3 May 2019	A mosque in Moneragala	Suspicious letter and several CDs	Moulavi and 1 person arrested	
3 May 2019	Welambada area, Udunuwara	Hand grenade, 15 live ammo, night vision goggles, NTJ tapes, books, computer	2 suspects in custody	
3 May 2019	Rented house in Udathutthiripitiya area, Yakala	9 sets of women's clothing	Suspected extremist in custody	
3 May 2019	Maligawatte, Colombo 10	7 swords, clothing resembling Army uniforms		
8 May 2019	30-foot deep well in Maligawatte, near a mosque	46 new Chinese swords, 12 second-hand swords, 52 knives, a foreign firearm, 5 ammo, 15g of narcotics, 26 CDs		

Further searches were conducted on 3 May 2019, in Peradeniya University premises, and suspicious locations in Moneragala, Anuradhapura, Katugastota, Puttalam, Kekirawa, Balapitiya, Welimada, and several other major areas. Pistols, NTJ literature/DVDs/CDs, T-56 rifles, ammunition rounds, swords, iron balls, bore 12 guns, machetes, and a stock of warlike items, were among those recoveries in the areas.

=== Facebook post ===
On 13 May 2019, a shopkeeper identified as 38-year-old Abdul Hameed Mohamed Hasmar had posted a Facebook comment titled "Don't laugh more, 1 day u will cry". Rioters mistook the post as a warning of an imminent threat, and launched a mob attack destroying his textile shop and vandalising a nearby mosque. Police fired warning shots to disperse the crowd, with a curfew imposed until dawn, social media was blocked. The incident sparked more rioting and incidents in other parts of the country. The author of the Facebook post, as well as a group of unnamed men who attacked Muslim-owned businesses, were arrested.

== International reactions ==
- The Organisation of Islamic Cooperation urged the government to take action against rioters.
