= K. M. Chellappah =

Sri Lankan philanthropist and Tamil scholar (1896–1958)

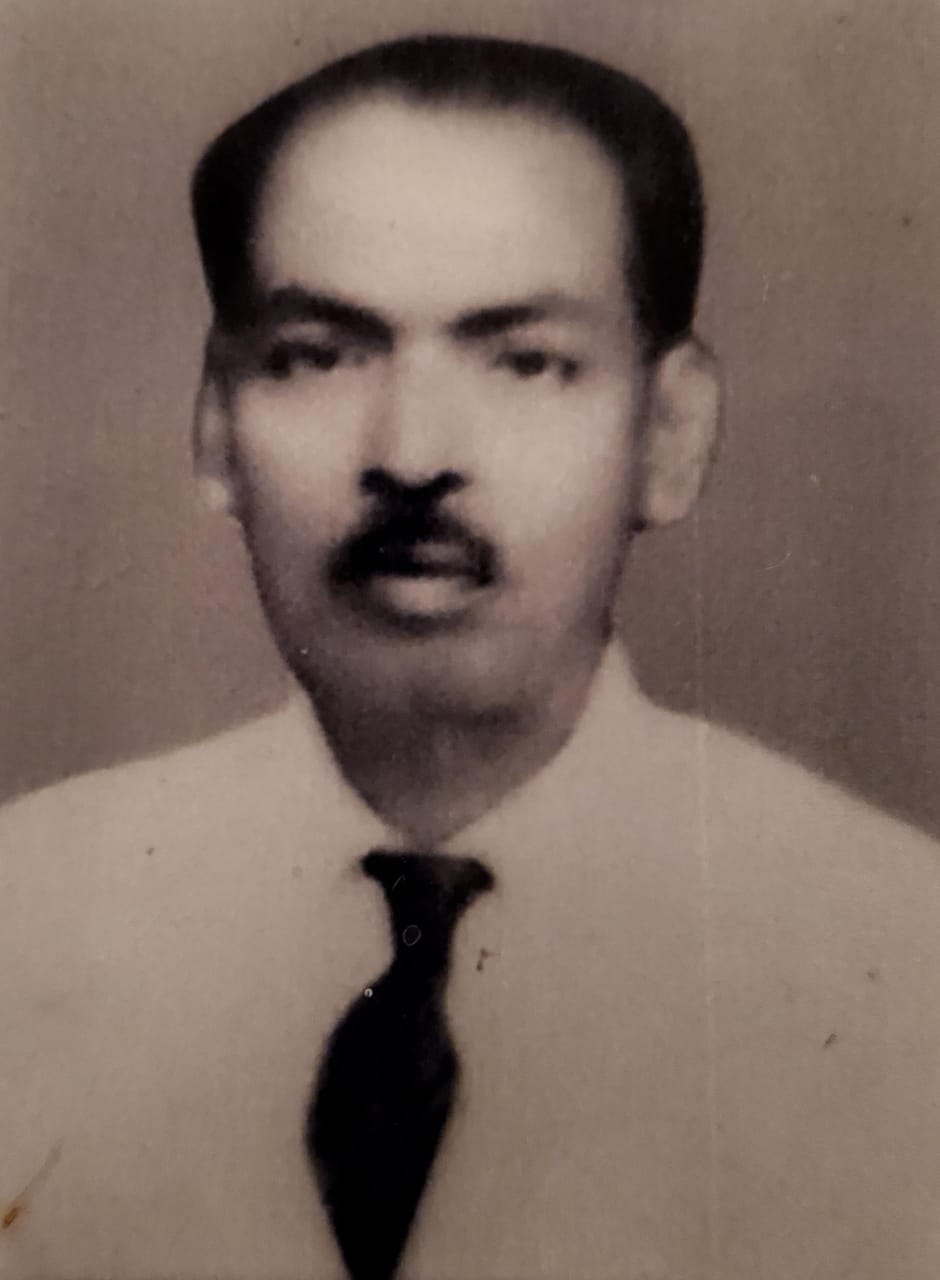
K.M. Chellappah

Kanagasabai Mudalithambi Chellappah (Tamil: கனகசபை முதலித்தம்பி செல்லப்பா; 24 February 1896 – 24 April 1958) was a Sri Lankan judicial officer, philanthropist, and scholar of the Tamil and Sinhala languages who was the pioneer of the free library movement in Sri Lanka and laid the foundation for building the Jaffna Public Library. In 1933, he started the first library in Jaffna, through lending books from his home in Puttur, Sri Lanka. This eventually blossomed into the establishment of the Jaffna Public Library, which was “regarded as among the most remarkable in South Asia and housed about 97,000 books, magazines and old news papers, many of them rare.”

== Early life and career ==
Born on 24 February 1896 in Puttur West, Sri Lanka, Chellappah was the fourth child of Kanthapillai Kanagasabai Mudalithambiyar and Chinnathambiar Nagamuthu. He studied at Puttur Mission School and completed his higher education in Jaffna Central College.

Chellappah later joined the royal service and began his professional career as judicial officer in a district court in Galle, Sri Lanka. He also worked in the district court of Jaffna, and the high court of Colombo, Gampaha, Galle, Matara, Kegalle, Puttalam, Negombo and Point Pedro. He retired as a chief secretary of Jaffna high court.

He married Mayilvaganam Chellammal and they had six children. He died on 24 April 1958 in Puttur West, Sri Lanka.

== Establishing first public library in Jaffna ==
While serving as chief secretary to the district court of Jaffna, in 1933, Chellappah started a small library for the public at his home with a collection of books, magazines, seasonal publications and periodicals.

In 1933, Chellappah made an appeal both in Tamil and English to establish a central free Tamil library in Jaffna which was published in the local newspapers, Indu Sathanam and Ceylon Free Press. He also sought support from teachers, merchants, and others in the form of books and donations to set up the library.

In response to this appeal, a meeting was held at Jaffna Central College on 9 June 1934, and discussed the ways to set up a formal public library in Jaffna. A committee named Central Free Library Association, headed by Justice C. Coomaraswamy, was formed for setting up a public library in Jaffna. Rev. Dr. Issac Thambiah, who was the High Court judge of Jaffna, became vice-chairman and Chellappah and C. Ponnambalam designated as joint secretaries.

On 1 August 1934, Chellappah and his associates shifted the library to a small rented room in Hospital Road, Jaffna and named it ‘Lanka House’ with a total of 844 books, with an increase in seasonal publications, periodicals, newspapers, manuscripts and magazines in the collection.

On 1 January 1935, this library was subsequently handed over to the Urban District Council of Jaffna to run as a free public library for people. In 1936, the library was again relocated to a bigger rented house on Main Street near the Town Hall. Books could be borrowed by paying a nominal sum of Rs. 3 as membership fee, while Chellappa kept mobilising donations to support the library. The library had a starting capital of Rs. 1,184 and 22 cents largely collected from the efforts of Chellappah.

The Jaffna Public Library was opened on 11 October 1959.
