= 1981 anti-Tamil pogrom =

Attacks in Sri Lanka

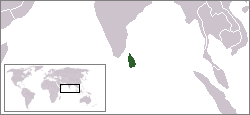
- Location of Sri Lanka
- Location: Sri Lanka
- Date: May–August 1981
- Target: Primarily Sri Lankan Tamil and Indian Tamil civilians
- Attack type: Pogrom, ethnic cleansing, mass murder, arson
- Weapons: Knives, clubs, iron rods, fire
- Deaths: 25
- Perpetrators: Sinhalese mobs, UNP, Sri Lankan government, Sri Lankan Armed Forces, Sri Lanka Police

A pogrom targeted Sri Lankan Tamils from June to August 1981. Organised Sinhalese mobs looted and burnt Tamil shops and houses in Jaffna, Ratnapura, Balangoda, Kahawatta, Colombo and in the border villages in the Batticaloa and Ampara Districts. Further looting, arson and killings then spread to the rural interior:

"In the hill country, crowds armed with clubs, iron rods, bicycle chains, swords and knives roamed the estates burning, pillaging, looting and killing. Police and army units stood watching, often encouraging the rioters. In the eastern border villages, entire villages were burnt down. People ran into the forests to save their lives. They then took refuge in government schools and Hindu temples. Over 25,000 Tamil plantation workers were rendered homeless in the hills and over 10,000 villagers were made refugees in the east."

Brian Eads, in the London Observer of 20 September 1981, reported that an orgy of arson and looting was planned, orchestrated and carried out in Jaffna by the predominantly Sinhalese Buddhist police force in the area.

During the violence the Jaffna public library was burned, as well as the offices of a Tamil newspaper, and the home of a Tamil MP. On the night of 31st May 1981, MP V. Yogeswaran’s jeep and house was completely burnt down by a mob of over 50 drunk Sinhalese security forces armed with rods, swords and rifles.

The violence was said to have been organised by members of the ruling United National Party. In all, 25 people died, scores of women were raped, and thousands were made homeless, losing all their belongings.

== See also ==
- List of anti-minority pogroms in Sri Lanka
- Sri Lankan Civil War
- List of attacks on civilians attributed to Sri Lankan government forces
