= Batticaloa Campus =

The Batticaloa Campus initially known as Malik Abdulla University College named after king Abdullah of Saudi Arabia is a proposed private university under construction in Batticaloa, Sri Lanka. The establishment of the university came under media attention following the Easter Sunday bombings carried out by Islamist terrorist group National Thowheeth Jama'ath. The institute has attracted a number of controversies including financial irregularities including in violation of financial regulations, forcible acquisition of land, teaching of Sharia law as well as well a "negative report" by the Intelligence agencies before construction began.

During the 2020 Coronavirus Outbreak the empty buildings were proposed to be used as a Quarantine centre for visitors from countries that were affected by the outbreak.

== History ==
The university was initiated in 2016 as the Malik Abdulla University College by then Government Minister Mahamood Hizbullah, who is the current Governor of Eastern Province with funding from Saudi Arabia, Qatar and the Sri Lankan Government on land released from Mahaweli Authority of Sri Lanka. In 2016 the name of changed to Batticaloa Campus Pvt Ltd.

== Controversy ==
=== Sharia law ===
Following the 2019 Sri Lanka Easter bombings, construction of the university has stopped and its nature has brought into question with claims that it is an Islamic university teaching Sharia law. While Hizbullah has denied that the university will teach Sharia law the website of the institute claimed that there will be a department dedicated to Sharia law but mentions of Sharia were removed after the controversy.

=== Degree awarding status ===
It has been claimed that the institution has been granted degree awarding status from the Ministry of Higher Education and Highways and the University Grants Commission. However this has been rejected by the government further stating that such an approval was not given for construction of such university.

=== Financial Irregularities ===
When questioned by the Parliamentary Select Committee to investigate the attacks Chairman of Bank of Ceylon (BOC) Senarath Bandara says that the Batticaloa Campus Private Limited never mentioned that Rs 3.5 billion deposited to the BOC savings accounts was received as a foreign loan from a Saudi Arabian company. While Hizbullah stated that he also received a grant he failed to submit any document to the Committee to prove it.

=== Forcible acquisition of land ===
The Parliamentary Select Committee called for an investigation the land allocated by the Mahaweli Authority of the Sri Lankan government as it was noted that the Campus was occupying 35 acres beyond what was allocated to it.

=== Negative report of Intelligence Agencies ===
When the Hira Foundation which builds the campus requested permission to register as a NGO in 2012 the intelligence agencies of Sri Lanka gave a "negative report". However the banks that handled the funds of the institute only became aware of this in the aftermath of the bombings.

=== Government takeover ===
The National University Teachers’ Associations has called for the government to take over the university. The government aftermath the terror attacks decided to assign the university under the Higher Education Ministry.

== See also ==
- 2019 anti-Muslim riots in Sri Lanka
