= 1986 Kalmunai Riots =

The 1986 Kalmunai Riots refers to the incidents of ethnic violence between Tamils and Muslims that took place in Kalmunai, Eastern Province of Sri Lanka in August 1986. News reports from that period indicate that these events involved killings, abductions, damage to homes and business establishments, arson, and the displacement of people. The violence intensified on August 10 and continued until August 20; it intensified again starting August 30.

== Background ==
A Muslim youth named Seenimuhammad Saravudeen visited Pandiruppu, an area falling under the Kalmunai Divisional Secretariat in the Ampara District. It is reported that he had gone there to make purchases; he was subsequently abducted, robbed of his money, and killed. His body was discovered in the early hours of August 10 near the Pandiruppu Hindu Maha Vidyalaya.

== List of attacks ==
=== Sunday, 10 August ===
News that the body of a young man had been found in Pandiruppu spread across Muslim-inhabited areas. Subsequently, around 7:30 AM, several Tamil-owned shops along the A4 highway (the main road in Kalmunai) were attacked by Muslims.

During the attacks on the shops, Kanagarathinam (aged 29) known as Chinnathambi was abducted; he was a resident of Vathiri in the Karavetti Divisional Secretariat division of Vadamarachchi, Jaffna, and the owner of a shop called 'Sothi Stores' in Kalmunai. Following this, the 2nd and 3nd divisions of Kalmunai came under attack. A Muslim mob arrived and set fire to 45 Tamil-owned houses. Eight Tamils were injured by machete attacks during this rampage. Amarasingam Sachithanandam, a postman from Kalmunai, was also attacked by another Muslim mob involved in the violence. He was admitted to Kalmunai Hospital after sustaining severe injuries.

Another group of Muslim mobs opened fire on Tamils in a different location in Kalmunai. As a result, Kandasamy Robinson Jayakumar, a 28-year-old Tamil man, was killed by gunfire. Two residents of 'Madhavan Street', Manickam Mohanadasan and Velmurugu also sustained gunshot wounds and were admitted to Kalmunai Hospital. Despite receiving medical treatment, one of them died to his injuries at the hospital. Three vans belonging to Tamils were also set on fire in this attack.

Tamils residing in the 2nd and 3rd divisions of Kalmunai fled and took refuge at Ramakrishna Mission College and Mamangam Vidyalayam. Consequently, the Sri Lankan army began conducting regular patrols. To bring the situation under control, they imposed a curfew. A 12-hour curfew was enforced, starting at 6:00 PM. As a result, all transport between Batticaloa and Kalmunai was completely halted on the evening of the 10th.

=== Monday, 11 August ===
Tensions flared up again the following morning as soon as the curfew was relaxed. Up to ten individuals from both Tamil and Muslim communities were abducted in a series of retaliatory incidents. Furthermore, two rice mills were set on fire, and a cooperative society outlet serving the Kalmunai area was looted. Tamils fled the area and sought shelter with relatives in schools located in Pandiruppu, Eerittimunai, and Thuraineelavanai. The persistent tension in Kalmunai also disrupted educational activities. Approximately 90 percent of Tamil students in Kalmunai did not sit for the A-Level examinations, and Tamil invigilators refrained from reporting for duty due to security concerns. Normal life came to a standstill as shops across the town remained closed.

The body of a Tamil person, with hands and feet tied, was discovered in the coastal waters off Kottaikkallaru. Due to the volatile situation, all transport and telecommunication services to Kalmunai were suspended. Transportation was limited to the stretch between Batticaloa and Thuraineelavanai. Consequently, a curfew was reimposed in the Kalmunai police division on the evening of the 11th. Despite the curfew, an attack was carried out against Muslims in Kalmunaikudi. Three people, including two women, were killed, and 12 others were injured. Twenty houses were damaged.

=== Tuesday, 12 August ===
News of the attack on the 11th sparked tension throughout Kalmunai. Subsequently, numerous Tamil homes were attacked by Muslims. As the violence escalated, five shops located near the Kalmunai General Hospital were set on fire; these included the shop of a Tamil merchant and those of four Muslim merchants. In the wake of the Kalmunai riots, the discovery of an unidentified body in the Onthachimadam area heightened tensions. There was widespread fear that the remains might belong to Alagarathinam Chinnathambi, a man who had been abducted by Muslims on the morning of the 10th. By the 12th, the riots had displaced approximately 3,500 Muslims and 8,000 Tamils. An atmosphere of tension and terror continued to prevail throughout the region.

=== Wednesday, 13 August ===
The following day, the sound of an explosion was heard. A petrol station owned by the younger brother of Kalmunai Member of Parliament Janab A.R.M. Mansoor had been attacked. However, there was no petrol in the storage tanks. That morning, food supplies worth 30,000 rupees were distributed to Tamil displaced persons in Kalmunai on behalf of the Bishop of the Trincomalee Diocese. Yet, no relief aid from the Sri Lankan government had been received by that evening.

On the evening of the 13th, three bodies, tied together, washed ashore near the Pandiruppu Hindu cemetery. These were the bodies of three Tamil workers who had been employed at a rice mill owned by a Muslim in Kalmunai. All three had come from Sandiveli in Batticaloa to work there.

=== Thursday, 14 August ===
On the 14th, the bodies of murdered Tamils continued to wash ashore. One body each washed up on the beaches of Maruthamunai and Periyathurai-Neelavanai. These were the bodies of Tamils who had been working in rice mills owned by Muslims. The body that washed up at Maruthamunai was buried by the local Muslim residents.

=== Friday, 15 August ===
Three unidentified bodies that had been buried in Pandiruppu were exhumed on the 15th for a legal inquiry. Subsequently, after post-mortem examinations were completed, they were reburied.

=== Saturday, 16 August ===
On August 16, the bodies of three more Tamils washed up along the Kalmunai coastline; one of these bodies was found in a decomposed state. Bodies were recovered from the beach areas of Pandiruppu, Neelavanai, Maruthamunai, and Kalladi. Notably, the recovered bodies showed chop wounds and lacerations caused by sharp weapons. They were believed to belong to Tamil laborers from other districts who had traveled to Kalmunai to work in Muslim-owned rice mills.

=== Tuesday, 19 August ===
On the 19th, the PLOTE organization issued a special leaflet emphasizing Tamil-Muslim unity. In it, the organization expressed regret over the Kalmunai riots, describing them as a dark chapter in the history of the liberation struggle that had caused significant loss of life and property for both communities. It pointed out that these dire consequences were the result of the actions of a few individuals acting on their own initiative. Furthermore, the organization pledged to take action against those responsible for the riots and warned through the leaflet that appropriate measures would be taken against anyone acting to sow division between the communities in the future.

On the same day, the Liberation Tigers of Tamil Eelam (LTTE) also issued a leaflet in Kalmunai. It condemned acts such as private looting and looting, warning that severe action would be taken if these activities did not cease. Relatives of the affected workers gathered at the Kalmunai police station and filed complaints, urging the authorities to locate their missing kin.

=== Wednesday, 20 August ===
On the 20th, Tamil-owned shops that had been closed due to the riots were looted by unidentified individuals. The shops targeted were Nithi Stores, Raja Stores, and Dhanalakshmi Stores. However, no reports of arson or gunfire emerged regarding that day's events.

=== Saturday, 30 August ===
On the 30th, six Muslim homes were set ablaze. This was followed by an armed group burning three Tamil houses, further escalating the violence. Gunfire continued throughout the night, while shops in the “Marikkattil” area were looted at night, when visibility was limited.

=== Sunday, 31 August ===
On the morning of the 31st, three youths, K. Ravindran, N. Selva, and S. Prabhakaran were injured by gunfire in the 'Inthar Kurichi' area and hospitalized. Amidst the escalating violence, the Kalmunai Peace Committee convened a meeting. However, the meeting was abruptly adjourned midway after a Tamil victim filed a complaint. Meanwhile, gunfire opened by uniformed personnel arriving in a government bus near the Pandiruppu market caused panic among the public. They fired indiscriminately into the air and towards the open fields, though no Tamils were injured or killed. It was later speculated that the individuals on the bus might have been members of the Muslim Home Guard. As a result of the unrest, shops in Kalmunai town were shuttered, and all urban activity came to a complete standstill.

Due to the renewed tension, eight thousand Tamils and approximately two thousand Muslims once again sought refuge as displaced persons in the camps. The Sri Lanka Army was called in to bring the situation under control, and a curfew was imposed from 5:00 p.m. on Sunday, the 31st, until 6:00 a.m. on Monday, September 1st.

== Response ==
=== Efforts by the Tamils to restore order ===
Tamils began efforts to establish a peace committee with representatives from both communities to end the violence and restore peace. On the political front, Deputy Minister Abdul Majeed and Pothuvil MP Uthumalevvai stepped in to try and de-escalate the situation. Meanwhile, A. Velmurugu, a former member of the Ampara District Development Council, established contact with Dr. Neelan Tiruchelvam, who was a prominent figure in the Tamil United Liberation Front (TULF) and provided a detailed briefing on the situation on the ground.

=== Ampara Muslim Provincial Council ===
The Muslim community passed a resolution calling for the Ampara District to be designated as a Muslim Provincial Council. A conference of delegates from mosques across the Eastern Province was held at the Addalaichenai Teachers' Training College. It was organized by the Federation of All-Mosque Councils of Ampara District and chaired by its leader, Al-Haj M.I.M. Meeralebbe. Prominent political figures, including Deputy Minister Abdul Majeed, Pottuvil Member of Parliament Uthuma Lebbe, and Muslim Congress Secretary Janab Ashraff, participated in the event. At the conclusion of the conference, a demand was unanimously put forward: either a separate provincial council should be established for the Eastern Province as a solution to the riots, or, failing that, the Ampara District should be converted into a Muslim Provincial Council.

=== Efforts by the Army to restore order ===
Following the volatile situation that arose after the incident on the 12th, the responsibility of controlling the ongoing unrest was entrusted to the Sri Lankan army stationed at the Kalmunai army camp. Following the Sri Lankan military's seizure of Kalmunai, army troops deployed under the orders of camp commander Captain Jayathilaka were ordered to secure the area. One Tamil youth was killed as a result of the gunfire.

=== Formation of the Kalmunai Peace Committee ===
A group of individuals committed to restore order established the "Kalmunai Peace Committee" with the aim of defusing the Tamil-Muslim unrest and fostering goodwill between the two communities. The committee held its inaugural meeting at the Kalmunai Police Station, chaired by D.S. Nandisena, the Government Agent of Ampara. Those in attendance included Swami Jeevanandaji, head of the Ramakrishna Mission; Janab Jeppar, chairman of the Ampara District Development Council; and former Members of Parliament Janab Abdul Majeed and Janab A.R. Mansoor.

Seven Tamils and seven Muslims were appointed as members of the peace committee as per the consultation. The committee passed the following resolutions at the meeting:

- Steps should be taken to release the detained Muslim and Tamil individuals within 24 hours.
- Appeals for harmony between the two communities should be broadcast through loudspeakers.

Even after these announcements were made, the two opposing groups refused to heed any of the demands.

=== Call by the Jaffna Muslim Conciliation Committee ===
The Jaffna Muslim Conciliation Committee appealed to Muslims in the Eastern Province and throughout the country to stand united against those attempting to create lasting hostility between the Tamil and Muslim communities. The Committee submitted this appeal to the All Ceylon Muslim Congress.

== Aftermath ==
=== Details of Damage from the First Phase of Riots ===
By the 20th, the riots had completely subsided, though significant loss of life and property had occurred within both the Tamil and Muslim communities. Details regarding this damage were released on the 22nd. According to these reports, approximately 400 houses, 100 fishing boats, 50 business establishments, and 6 rice mills were damaged. Additionally, a Saivite temple and an Islamic educational institution were attacked and damaged.

Regarding casualties, a total of 12 people, comprising 4 Muslims and 8 Tamils were killed. Furthermore, no information was available concerning the status of 7 individuals believed to have been abducted. A total of 310 displaced Tamil refugees sought shelter in three temporary camps due to the riots. The violence, which had temporarily ceased on August 20th, did not erupt again until August 29th. Although a temporary calm prevailed during this nine-day interval, a sense of fear and tension persisted among the people.

=== Peace Committee Meeting ===
An urgent peace meeting was held at the Kalmunai police station on September 1st to address the renewed Tamil-Muslim clashes in Kalmunai and to restore peace. The meeting was chaired by Captain Sumanadasa, the Ampara District Coordinating Officer, and attended by prominent representatives of both communities, including Janab Abdul Jabbar, Chairman of the District Development Council. During the meeting, the two factions presented conflicting views regarding security measures. Tamil leaders insisted on direct assistance from the Sri Lanka Army to halt the clashes. Conversely, Muslim leaders argued that peace would return only if the Special Task Force (STF) conducted patrols. The meeting highlighted the differing stances held by the two communities regarding the security forces' role in managing the violent situation.

On September 2nd, Muslim ministers and community leaders requested President J.R. Jayewardene to deploy the Special Task Force (STF). Meanwhile, prominent Tamil figures appealed to the President, through Tamil ministers to secure the intervention of the Army. A prevailing fear among the Tamil people was that the arrival of the Special Task Force could trigger a situation similar to the ethnic violence that occurred in Karaithivu in 1985. Driven by this apprehension, Tamils began leaving their homes to relocate to safer areas.
