= 1976 anti-Muslim violence in Puttalam =

Attacks on Sri Lankan Muslims by Sinhalese mobs and police

- Location of the Puttalam District in Sri Lanka
- Location: Puttalam District, North Western Province, Sri Lanka
- Date: 31 January–7 February 1976
- Target: Muslim civilians
- Attack type: Shooting, riots, arson, looting, assault
- Weapons: Swords, axes, clubs, fire, guns, petrol bombs
- Deaths: 11
- Injuries: 12+
- Perpetrators: Sri Lankan Police, Sinhalese mobs
- Motive: Economic rivalry, majoritarianism

The 1976 anti-Muslim violence in Puttalam was a series of organised violent events by Sinhalese mobs against the Muslim population of Puttalam in northwestern Sri Lanka, which occurred between 31 January and 7 February 1976. The violence was carried out under the leadership of a Buddhist monk and with the complicity of local authorities. It culminated in the killing of seven Muslims in the Puttalam Jumma Mosque by the police on 2 February.

Overall, eleven Muslims were killed, and dozens were injured. 271 Muslim houses, 44 Muslim shops and two mosques were burnt down by mobs. This was the second major outbreak of communal violence between the Sinhalese and Muslim communities since 1915.

== Background ==
In the early 1970s, there was a growing anti-Muslim sentiment among the Sinhalese over alleged privileges enjoyed by the Muslim community, and by the mid-1970s there had been several attacks on Muslims in various parts of the country by Sinhalese mobs and police which resulted in Muslim houses and shops being burned. During this time there was also rising communal tension between the two communities in the Muslim-dominated Puttalam town over jobs and land, which was inflamed by the influx of Sinhalese settlers and workers to the region from the south. Local Muslims felt discriminated by the state which gave preferential treatment to Sinhalese settlers. The Sinhalese resented the Muslim monopoly over trade in the town and sought to replace them.

Several Muslims saw the anger of the Sinhalese as rooted in class. There was a large economic gap between the wealthy Muslims of Puttalam town and poorer Sinhalese in the surrounding villages. They also claimed that Sinhalese vegetable sellers and rice smugglers were victims of intimidation and theft by Muslim porters. Because the smugglers had no recourse in the legal system, they turned to Kolitha Thero, a Buddhist monk and the incumbent of the Puttalam Buddhist Centre, and Puttalam government agent Rajapaksha.

Starting in early January 1976, clashes between the two communities were sparked by a dispute over a bus stand being shifted away from the town. The stand's location was originally near Muslim shops, so the relocation cut down business for them. Furthermore, it encouraged the Sinhalese to stop and re-route buses through Sinhalese areas. Kolitha Thero and Rajapaksha were believed to have played a role in the relocation. Kolitha Thero also played a leading role in the anti-Muslim campaign that involved Sinhalese employees of the Ceylon Transport Board (CTB). Sinhalese police officers in Puttalam also mistreated Muslims.

== Anti-Muslim violence ==
=== Prelude ===
On 30 January 1977, the headquarters sub-inspector of the Puttalam police, de Mel, forcibly removed the road barriers outside the Mohideen Jummah Mosque meant to facilitate the Friday Muslim prayers. Subsequently, Muslims of the mosque marched to the Puttalam police station and lodged a complaint against the offending officer. On the next day the higher authorities promised the Muslims disciplinary action against those responsible. Another account suggested that the police perceived the appearance of the large crowd as an attempt at intimidation and they responded by moving the bus stand further away from the town close to the Buddhist Centre in a Sinhalese area which left Muslim passersby vulnerable.

=== 31 January ===
On the same day at 1:00 pm, news of Muslim workers being attacked by Sinhalese workers at the Puttalam Cement Factory was spreading. By 3:00 pm, a Muslim shop was burned down by a Sinhalese mob near the Cement Factory. When the Muslim MP for Puttalam requested the Puttalam police intervene, the sub-inspector, de Mel, refused, claiming the police jeep was under repair and also refused when the MP offered his own jeep. Later that day several organised Sinhalese mobs started operating. The mob under the leadership of Kolitha Thero assaulted Muslims passing by the Buddhist Centre. A Muslim teacher named Ameer suffered severe injuries and was hospitalised. Buses coming into the town were stoned, Muslim passengers pulled out and assaulted. CTB bus drivers also assaulted their Muslim passengers on the instruction of the monk.

One Sinhalese mob in Sirambiyadi looted and burned Muslim shops. Another mob mainly consisting of CTB employees assaulted, stripped and robbed Muslim passengers at the main bus station of Puttalam. The Sinhalese mob at Pottuvilu attacked Muslim cultivators and burned down their houses. Muslims outside the Puttalam town were prevented from fleeing into it by the police and reinforcements which encouraged Sinhalese mobs to attack them.

=== 1 February ===
On the next day, Muslim shops in Palavi, Madurankuli and Pottuvillu were burned, and in Kottukachcheri Muslims were attacked by Sinhalese mobs. CTB bus drivers were also fanning the flames by spreading false rumours against Muslims, accusing them of killing Sinhalese in Puttalam.

=== 2 February ===
By the morning of 2 February, Muslims of Puttalam were apprehensive, fueled by the rumours that the police had instructed the Army and the Navy to leave the town and that the town was going to be attacked by Sinhalese employees of the Cement Factory and the CTB and a Sinhalese mob from the outside. A crowd of Muslims who had gathered near the Jummah Mosque attacked buses and lorries passing by on the misassumption that they were bringing the Sinhalese attackers. Meanwhile, a deputation of Muslims had gone to the police station to discuss the incidents. A member of the deputation, Dr. Ilyas of the People's Committee, recounted that Headquarters Inspector Edward refused to listen and ordered the police to open fire at the crowd.

A Muslim assistant superintendent of police arrived at the scene and warned the crowd to leave as the police was preparing to shoot them. Some left while others attacked the properties of Sinhalese. Two police units approached the mosque from the east and west sides. The western police shot at shops on the east side, and Edward had fired into the air. The crowd scattered, seeking refuge either in the mosque or the shops. Then, western police turned their firing to the mosque, and subsequently, the eastern police too opened fire. Between 18 and 20 Muslims inside the mosque were shot and seven of them died. Another estimate suggested fifteen were critically injured. Some of the crowd later theorized that the eastern police opened fire because they mistook the western police's gunfire to be coming from Muslims in the mosque. A Muslim police constable thought that there had been shooting from the shops, but did not believe that Muslims had fired from the mosque.

During this time Kolitha Thero went to the Puttalam Cement Factory and spread false rumours among the Sinhalese workers about Sinhalese children being killed by the Muslims. A group of the Sinhalese workers went to the Kallady junction where they tied up a Muslim boy and poured petrol on him. The monk told them to collect more Muslim boys to be burned alive. When a Navy patrol arrived at the scene, the mob fled and the boy was rescued. The monk collected weapons in the area to attack Muslims in the Puttalam town. The mob led by Kolitha Thero and another mob at Sirambiyadiya burned an oil factory owned by a Muslim while the police nearby did not intervene. In Sirambiyadiya, a Sinhalese mob looted and burned down Muslim shops, and killed a Muslim watchman. The mob led by the monk entered the Puttalam town and threw petrol bombs into Muslim houses; it was later dispersed by the Army.

A 500-strong Sinhalese mob armed with weapons set out to burn the jeep of the town headman, Abul Hasan, which was transporting some of the wounded Muslims from the mosque shooting. The Army arrived and dispersed the mob. Later on the mob went to Palavi by bus provided to them by the police and burned down Muslim shops. At this place some police officers directed the buses carrying Muslim passengers toward the Cement Factory where Muslims were being attacked by a Sinhalese mob. When one such bus reached the area, a Muslim boy named Rasheed attempted to flee but was caught by the mob, he was hit on the head with an axe, shot and burned to death.

Three buses carrying Sinhalese mobs came to Madurankuliya immediately after the police declared a curfew and the mobs looted shops as the police looked on. A Muslim named Qasim along with his house and shop were burned by the mob at the same place.

=== 3 February ===
On the next day the Sinhalese CTB bus drivers were spreading anti-Muslim rumours to neighbouring districts where violence also erupted. During the night a Sinhalese mob came to Nikaweratiya in government lorries and disabled the power lines; they then looted and burned shops and houses, and assaulted Muslims while appeals to the local police went unanswered. A Muslim village called Nallachchi was completely burned down by the mob. In Nochchiyagama, Sinhalese mob looted and burned shops and houses while the police took no action.

=== 4 February ===
On 4 February, burning and looting continued. The Puttalam police took no action against the Sinhalese culprits in response to Muslim complaints. Thereafter, police investigating officers from Colombo came to Puttalam and took immediate action by arresting many culprits. However, when Kolitha Thero made a journey to Colombo to protest against this, most of these officers were withdrawn and many of the culprits were released. After the government came to the conclusion that the Puttalam police was complicit in the violence, the Army was given the authority to maintain law and order. By 7 February the violence had ceased.

== Aftermath ==
The police took the deceased from the mosque and issued death certificates. Some Muslims accused the police of disrespecting the dead bodies. The injured were taken to Dr. Illyas' home or the Chilaw hospital under guard. Funerals of the dead Muslims took place the next day with police protection, but there was a curfew and Muslims were unpermitted to leave their homes or the town for several days.

A government fact-finding team visited Puttalam and the Ceylon Daily Mirror reported that the team suggested to Prime Minister Sirimavo Bandaranaike that the riots resulted from a small dispute being inflamed by "political spies". It also reported that disturbances in Nikaweratiya were caused by outsiders.

In parliament, Bandaranaike falsely blamed the mosque shooting on Muslims firing at the police after being misinformed by the Puttalam police. The government transferred the police officers from Puttalam but refused calls for a public inquiry into the violence. A magisterial inquiry ruled the shooting as "justifiable homicide". Bandaranaike also blamed "politically motivated mischief makers" for the communal tensions.

Tamil leader S. J. V. Chelvanayakam raised the issue of the mosque shooting in the parliament while some Muslim leaders remained silent. M. H. M. Ashraff, founder of the Muslim United Front, appreciated this gesture and campaigned for Chelvanayagam's newly-formed Tamil United Liberation Front (TULF) in its goal of establishing an independent state for the Tamil-speaking people.

Two months after the riots, United National Party (UNP) MP M. H. M. Naina Marikar told parliament that Puttalam Muslims had been traumatised by the February violence and that those displaced had not been given adequate assistance or shelter. He also had complained that Rajapaksha, despite having earlier promised compensation, did not provide any. Later, in September 1983, Marikar, now acting minister of finance and planning, paid compensation to those shot at the mosque. Muslims reported that compensation of Rs. 25,000 for the deceased and Rs. 15,000 for the injured were awarded, but property damage was not compensated.

== Legacy ==
The TULF's historic Vaddukoddai Resolution adopted on 14 May 1976 cited the police and mob violence against Muslims as examples of government brutality towards Tamil-speaking people to terrorize them.

As the main opposition party, the UNP sought to politicize the violence. During its campaign for the 1977 Sri Lankan parliamentary election, it made an election promise that, if elected, it would launch an inquiry into the violence. The UNP subsequently won a landslide victory at the election, securing a supermajority in parliament.
