= Jaffna Public Library =

Public library in Jaffna, Sri Lanka

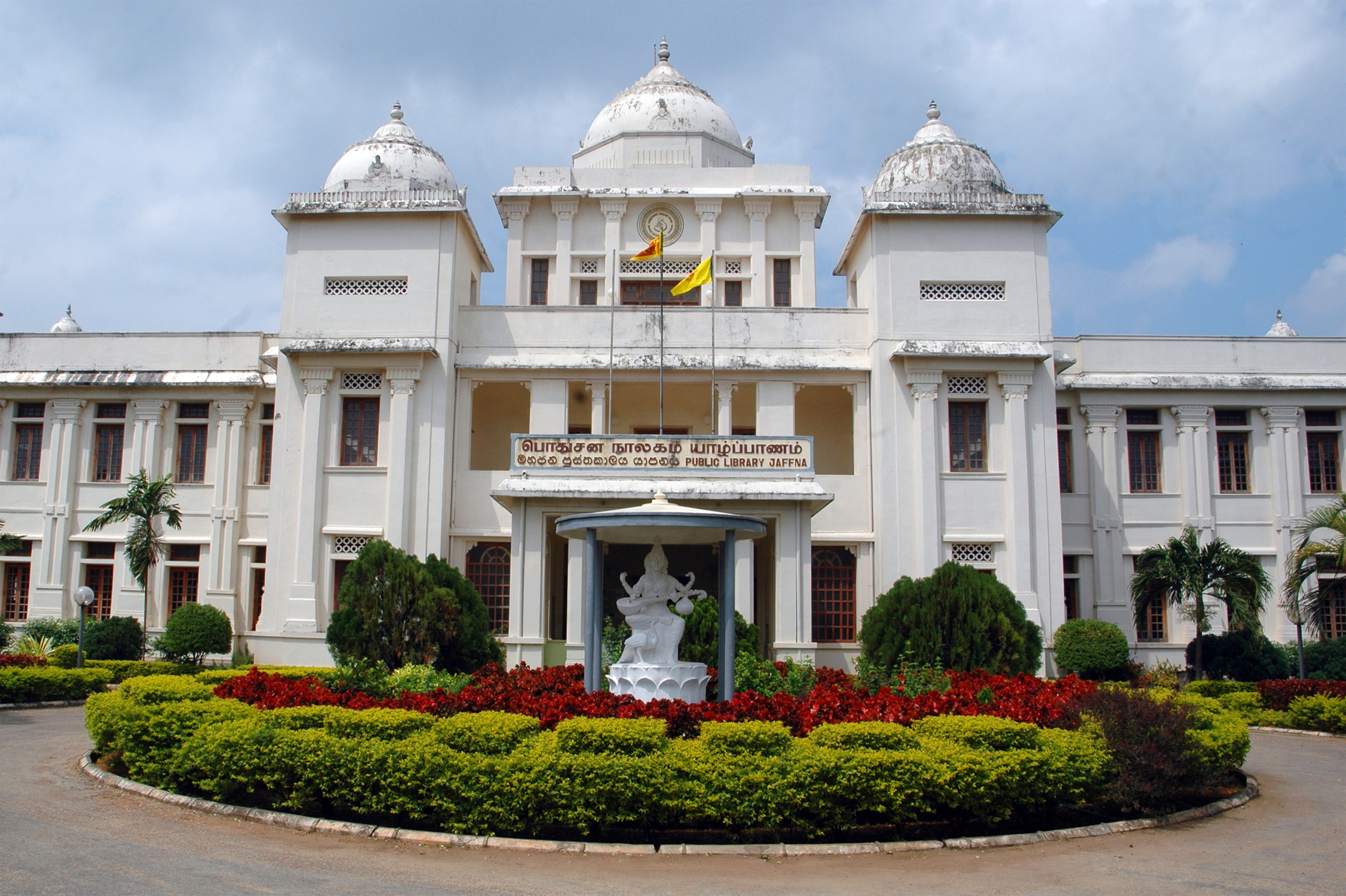
- Jaffna Public Library
- 9°39′43.42″N 80°0′42.61″E
- Location: Jaffna, Sri Lanka
- Established: 1933; 93 years ago
- Branches: 6
- Parent organization: Jaffna Municipal Council

Jaffna Public Library (Tamil: யாழ் பொது நூலகம், romanized: Yaazh Pothu Noolagam; Sinhala: යාපනය මහජන පුස්තකාලය, romanized: Yāpanaya Mahajana Pustakālaya) is located in Jaffna, Sri Lanka. It is one of Jaffna's landmarks, and is run by the Jaffna Municipal Council. The library was built in 1933 and is Sri Lanka's second main public Library, only rivalled by Colombo Public Library During the early 1980s, it was one of the biggest libraries in Asia, containing over 97,000 books and manuscripts. In 1981, it was burned down in a deliberate mob attack. Over a million books were burned in the 1981 arson attack, and some ancient Tamil books and manuscripts were never recovered. In 2001, the renovation of the library was completed, with new structures being built and new books received, although its old books and manuscripts were not replaced.

== See also ==
- Burning of Jaffna library
